= Legacy of Alan Turing =

Impact of English computer scientist

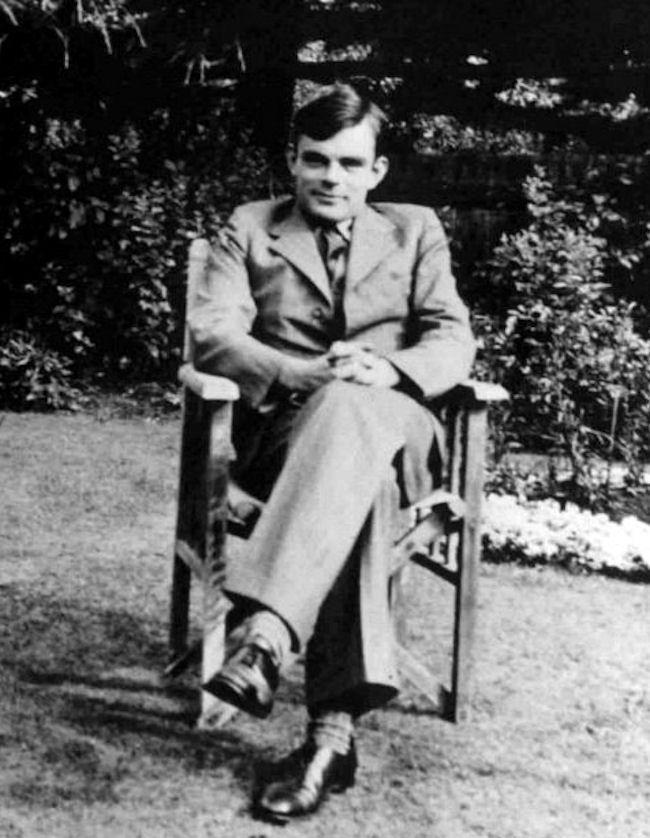
Turing c. 1928 at age 16

Alan Turing OBE FRS (/ˈtjʊərɪŋ/; 23 June 1912 – 7 June 1954) was an English mathematician, computer scientist, logician, cryptanalyst, philosopher, and theoretical biologist. He left an extensive legacy in mathematics, science, society and popular culture.

== Awards, honours, and tributes ==
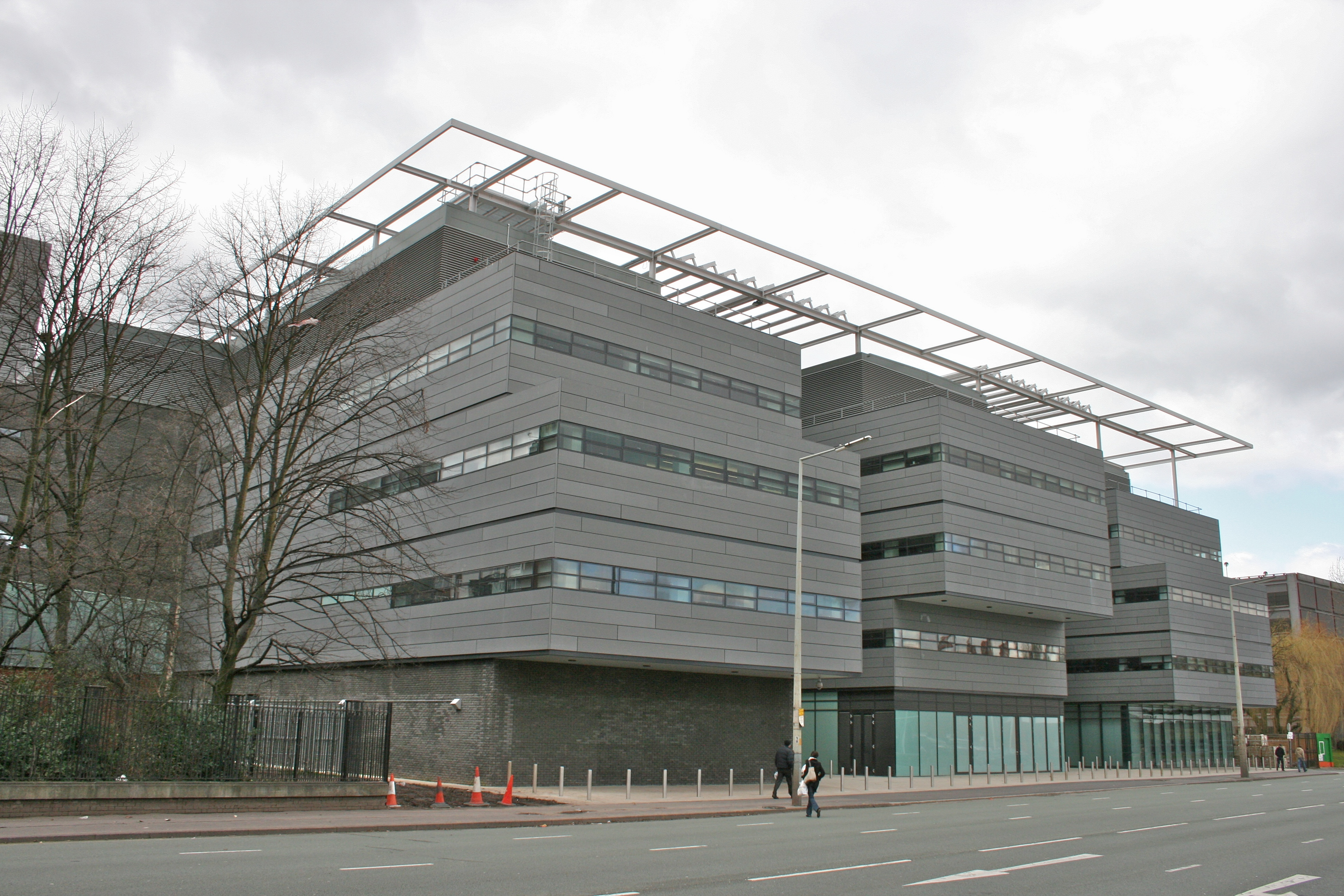
The Alan Turing Building at the University of Manchester in 2008

Turing was appointed an officer of the Order of the British Empire 1946. He was also elected a Fellow of the Royal Society (FRS) in 1951. Several things are named in his honour:

- Alan Turing Institute
- Church–Turing thesis
- Good–Turing frequency estimation
- Turing completeness
- Turing degree
- Turing fixed-point combinator
- Turing Institute
- Turing Lecture
- Turing machine
- Turing patterns
- Turing reduction
- Turing test
- Turing Award

=== Posthumous tributes ===
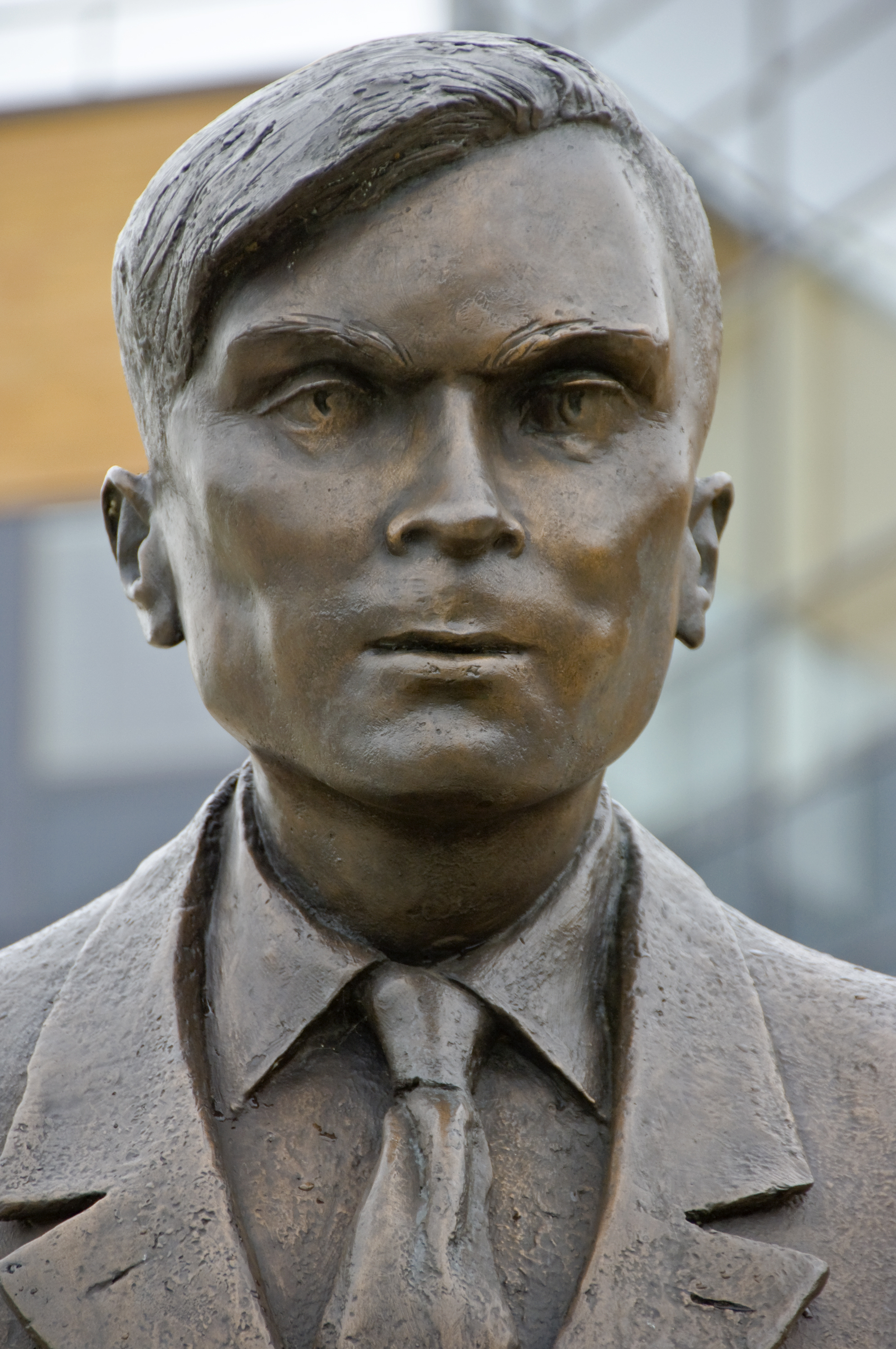
Statue of Turing at the University of Surrey

Various institutions have paid tribute to Turing by naming things after him including:

- The laboratory in Sherborne School, where he was schooled, is named The Alan Turing Laboratory.
- The computer room at King's College, Cambridge, Turing's alma mater, is called the Turing Room.
- The Turing Room at the University of Edinburgh's School of Informatics houses a bust of Turing by Eduardo Paolozzi, and a set (No. 42/50) of his Turing prints (2000).
- The University of Surrey has a statue of Turing on their main piazza and one of the buildings of Faculty of Engineering and Physical Sciences is named after him.
- Istanbul Bilgi University organises an annual conference on the theory of computation called "Turing Days".
- The University of Texas at Austin has an honours computer science programme named the Turing Scholars.
- In the early 1960s, Stanford University named the sole lecture room of the Polya Hall Mathematics building "Alan Turing Auditorium".
- One of the amphitheatres of the Computer Science department (LIFL) at the University of Lille in northern France is named in honour of Alan M. Turing (the other amphitheatre is named after Kurt Gödel).
- The University of Washington has a computer laboratory named after Turing.
- Oxford Brookes University has a building named after Turing.
- Alan Turing Road in the Surrey Research Park and the Alan Turing Way, part of the Manchester inner ring road. Alan Turing road in Loughborough are named after Turing.
- Carnegie Mellon University has a granite bench, situated in the Hornbostel Mall, with the name "A.M. Turing" carved across the top, "Read" down the left leg, and "Write" down the other.
- The University of Oregon has a bust of Turing on the side of Deschutes Hall, the computer science building.
- The École Polytechnique Fédérale de Lausanne has a road and a square named after Turing (Chemin Alan Turing and Place Alan Turing).
- The Faculty of Informatics and Information Technologies Slovak University of Technology in Bratislava, Slovakia, has a lecture room named "Turing Auditorium".
- The Paris Diderot University has a lecture room named "Amphithéâtre Turing".
- The Faculty of Mathematics and Computer Science at the University of Würzburg has a lecture hall named "Turing Hörsaal".
- The Paul Sabatier University in Toulouse has a lecture room named "Amphithéâtre Turing" (Bâtiment U4).
- The largest conference hall at the Amsterdam Science Park is named Turingzaal.
- King's College London's School of Natural and Mathematical Sciences awards the Alan Turing Centenary Prize.
- The University of Kent named the Turing College after him at their Canterbury campus.
- The campus of the École polytechnique has a building named after Turing; it is a research centre whose premises are shared by the École Polytechnique, the INRIA and Microsoft.
- The University of Toronto developed the Turing programming language in 1982, named after Turing.
- The campus of State University of Campinas in Brazil has an avenue, one of its largest, named after Turing.
- Ghent University named a computer room after Turing, in their department of Computer Science and Applied Mathematics.
- Nvidia unveiled their line of GeForce Graphics Cards based on the Turing microarchitecture, which in turn was named after Turing. The architecture introduces the first consumer products capable of real-time raytracing, which has been a longstanding goal of the computer graphics industry.
- Turing House School in London and one of the 'houses' at Wellacre Academy in Manchester are named after him.
- Redmond, Washington, the location of Microsoft Corporation's headquarters, named a street adjacent to the Microsoft main Campus after Turing, along with streets named for other historically significant scientists and inventors.
- The University of Wolverhampton has a tribunal "Alan Turing" building in honour of the code breaker.

A biography published by the Royal Society shortly after Turing's death, while his wartime work was still subject to the Official Secrets Act, recorded:

Three remarkable papers written just before the war, on three diverse mathematical subjects, show the quality of the work that might have been produced if he had settled down to work on some big problem at that critical time. For his work at the Foreign Office he was awarded the OBE.

Since 1966, the Turing Award has been given annually by the Association for Computing Machinery for technical or theoretical contributions to the computing community. It is widely considered to be the computing world's highest honour, equivalent to the Nobel Prize.

On 23 June 1998, on what would have been Turing's 86th birthday, his biographer, Andrew Hodges, unveiled an official English Heritage blue plaque at his birthplace in Warrington Crescent, London, later the Colonnade Hotel. To mark the 50th anniversary of his death, a memorial plaque was unveiled on 7 June 2004 at his former residence, Hollymeade, in Wilmslow, Cheshire.

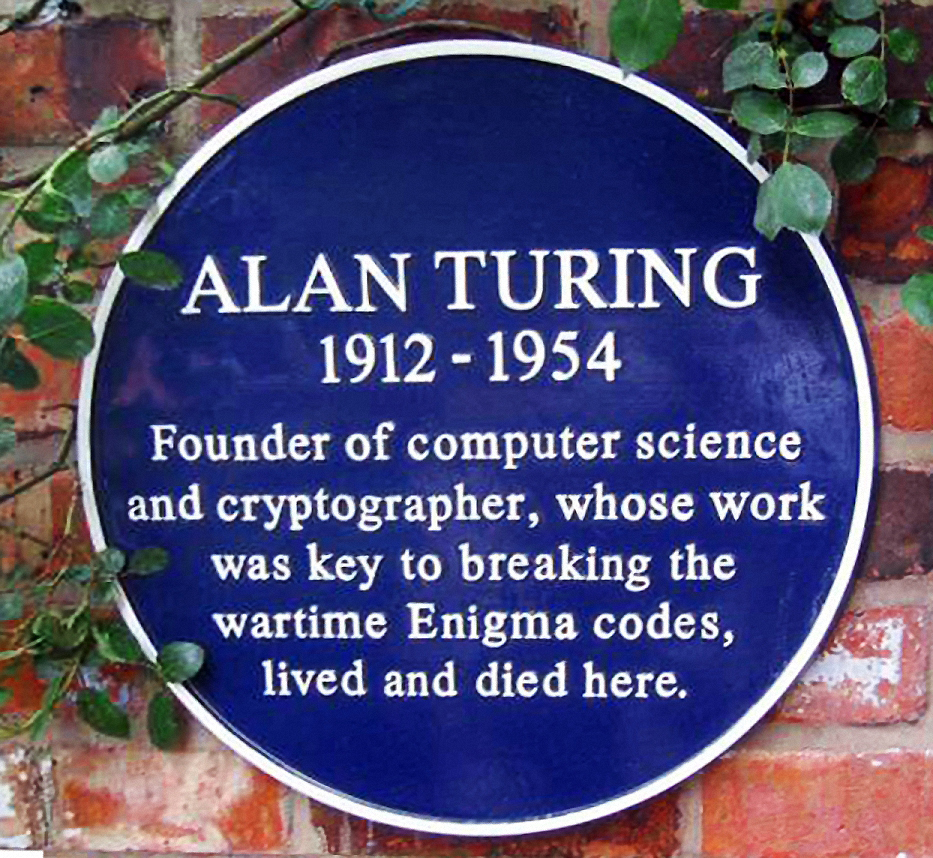
A blue plaque marking Turing's home at Wilmslow, Cheshire

On 13 March 2000, Saint Vincent and the Grenadines issued a set of postage stamps to celebrate the greatest achievements of the 20th century, one of which carries a portrait of Turing against a background of repeated 0s and 1s and is captioned: "1937: Alan Turing's theory of digital computing". On 1 April 2003, Turing's work at Bletchley Park was named an IEEE Milestone. On 28 October 2004, a bronze statue of Turing sculpted by John W. Mills was unveiled at the University of Surrey in Guildford, marking the 50th anniversary of Turing's death; it portrays him carrying his books across the campus.

Turing was one of four mathematicians examined in the BBC documentary entitled Dangerous Knowledge (2008). The Princeton Alumni Weekly named Turing the second most significant alumnus in the history of Princeton University, second only to President James Madison. A 1.5-ton, life-size statue of Turing was unveiled on 19 June 2007 at Bletchley Park. Built from approximately half a million pieces of Welsh slate, it was sculpted by Stephen Kettle, having been commissioned by the American billionaire Sidney Frank.

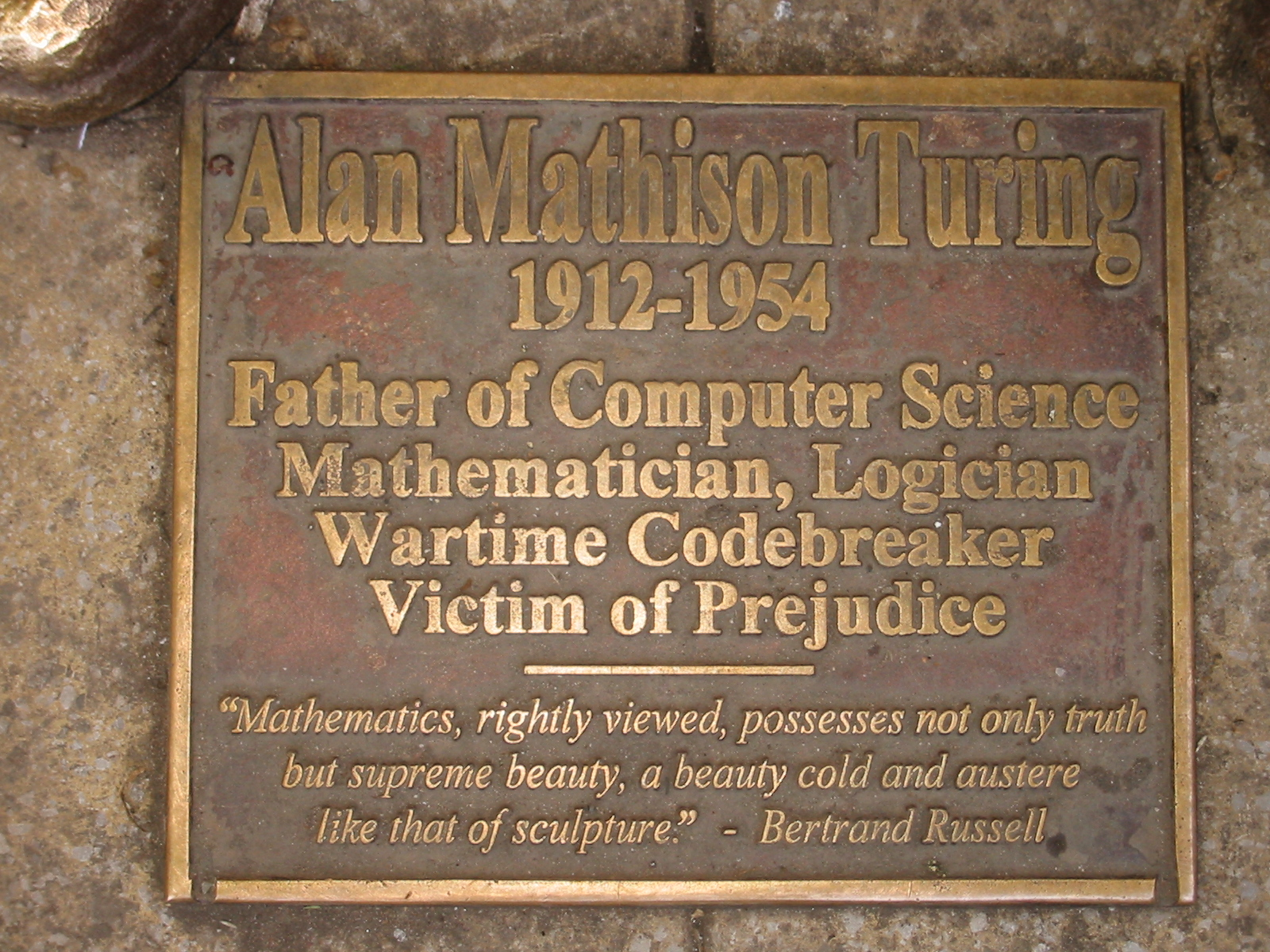
Turing memorial statue plaque in Sackville Park, Manchester

Turing has been honoured in various ways in Manchester, the city where he worked towards the end of his life. In 1994, a stretch of the A6010 road (the Manchester city intermediate ring road) was named "Alan Turing Way". A bridge carrying this road was widened and carries the name Alan Turing Bridge A statue of Turing was unveiled in Manchester on 23 June 2001 in Sackville Park, between the University of Manchester building on Whitworth Street and Canal Street. The memorial statue depicts the "father of computer science" sitting on a bench at a central position in the park, holding an apple. The cast bronze bench carries in relief the text "Alan Mathison Turing 1912–1954" and "IEKYF ROMSI ADXUO KVKZC GUBJ". The latter is described as "a motto as encoded by the German 'Enigma'". A plaque at the statue's feet reads "Father of Computer Science, Mathematician, Logician, Wartime Codebreaker, Victim of Prejudice", followed by a Bertrand Russell quotation: "Mathematics, rightly viewed, possesses not only truth but supreme beauty, a beauty cold and austere like that of sculpture."

In 1999, Time magazine named Turing as one of the 100 Most Important People of the 20th century and stated, "The fact remains that everyone who taps at a keyboard, opening a spreadsheet or a word-processing program, is working on an incarnation of a Turing machine."

In 2002, Turing was ranked twenty-first on the BBC's poll of the 100 Greatest Britons following a UK-wide vote. In 2006, British writer and mathematician Ioan James chose Turing as one of twenty people to feature in his book about famous historical figures who may have had some of the traits of Asperger syndrome. In 2010, actor/playwright Jade Esteban Estrada portrayed Turing in the solo musical, Icons: The Lesbian and Gay History of the World, Vol. 4. In 2011, in The Guardian's "My hero" series, writer Alan Garner chose Turing as his hero and described how they had met while out jogging in the early 1950s. Garner remembered Turing as "funny and witty" and said that he "talked endlessly". In 2006, Turing was named with online resources as an LGBT History Month Icon. In 2006, Boston Pride named Turing their Honorary Grand Marshal.

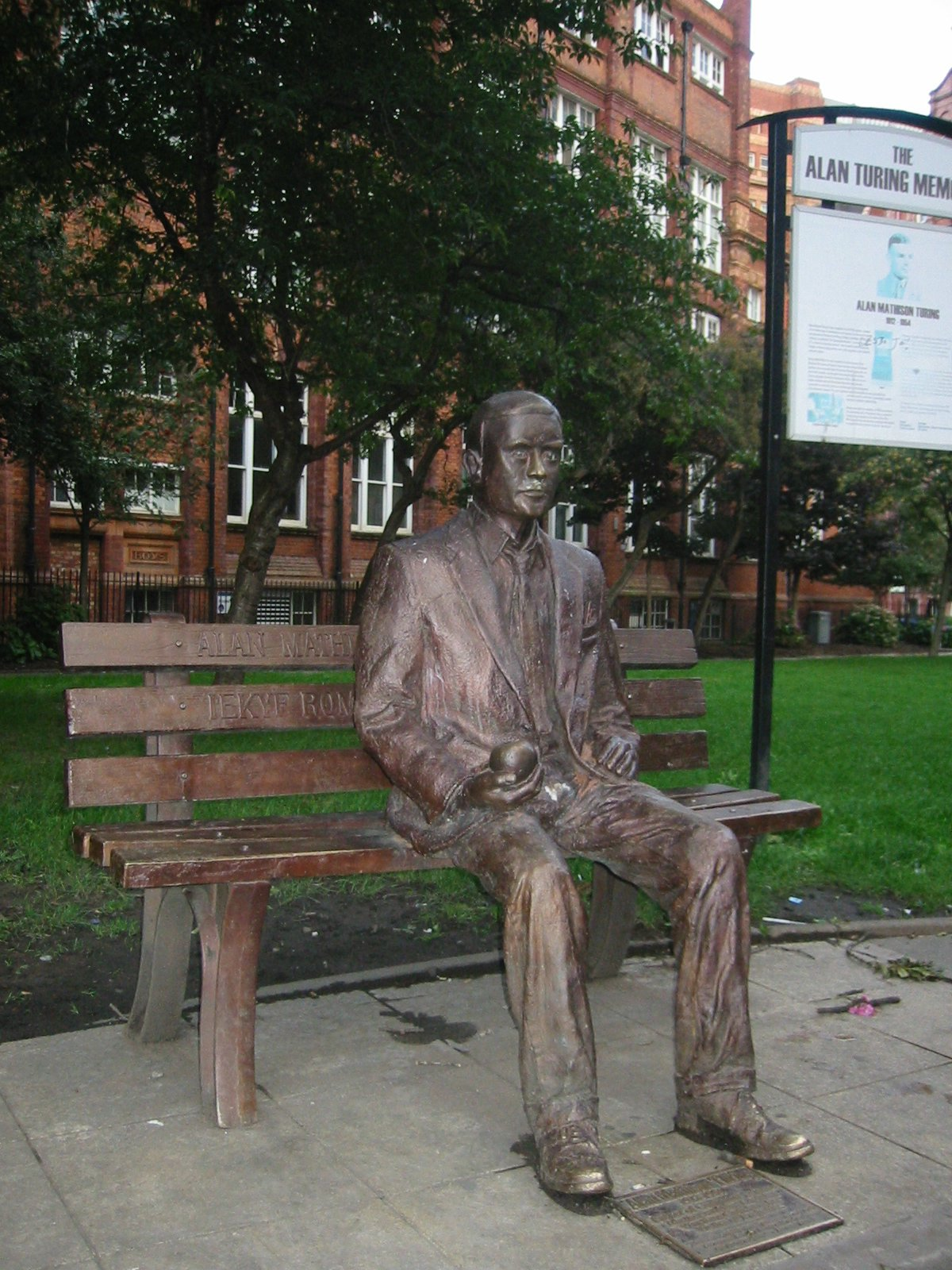
Turing memorial statue in Sackville Park, Manchester

The logo of Apple Inc. is often erroneously referred to as a tribute to Turing, with the bite mark a reference to his death. Both the designer of the logo and the company deny that there is any homage to Turing in the design. Stephen Fry has recounted asking Steve Jobs whether the design was intentional, saying that Jobs' response was, "God, we wish it were." In February 2011, Turing's papers from the Second World War were bought for the nation with an 11th-hour bid by the National Heritage Memorial Fund, allowing them to stay at Bletchley Park.

In 2012, Turing was inducted into the Legacy Walk, an outdoor public display that celebrates LGBT history and people.

The song "Alan et la Pomme", by francophone singer-songwriter Salvatore Adamo, is a tribute to Turing. Turing's life and work featured in a BBC children's programme about famous scientists, Absolute Genius with Dick and Dom, first broadcast on 12 March 2014.

On 17 May 2014, the world's first work of public art to recognise Turing as gay was commissioned in Bletchley, close by to Bletchley Park where his war-time work was carried out. The commission was announced to mark International Day Against Homophobia, Transphobia and Biphobia. The work was unveiled at a ceremony on Turing's birthday, 23 June 2014, and is placed alongside busy Watling Street, the old main road to London, where Turing himself would have passed by on many occasions. On 22 October 2014, Turing was inducted into the NSA Hall of Honor.

In 2014, Turing was one of the inaugural honorees in the Rainbow Honor Walk, a walk of fame in San Francisco's Castro neighborhood noting LGBTQ people who have "made significant contributions in their fields."

In February 2019, in the BBC eight-part TV series Icons: The Greatest Person of the 20th Century, Turing was voted by viewers to be the Greatest Person.

In July 2019, the Bank of England announced that Turing's portrait would appear on the next edition of the Bank of England £50 note, to be released in 2021. He is the first openly gay person to appear on a banknote.

In 2021, Turing's former residence, Hollymeade, on Adlington Road, Wilmslow, was offered for sale by estate agent Savills, having previously been sold in 2013.

On 17 June 2025, a collection of Turing’s academic papers, including his PhD dissertation, was sold at auction for £465,400 after being discovered in a loft.

== Centenary celebrations ==
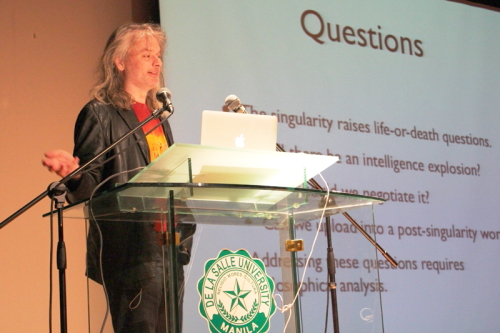
David Chalmers on stage for an Alan Turing Year conference at De La Salle University, Manila, 27 March 2012

To mark the 100th anniversary of Turing's birth, the Turing Centenary Advisory Committee (TCAC) coordinated the Alan Turing Year, a year-long programme of events around the world honouring Turing's life and achievements. The TCAC, chaired by S. Barry Cooper with Turing's nephew Sir John Dermot Turing acting as Honorary President, worked with the University of Manchester faculty members and a broad spectrum of people from Cambridge University and Bletchley Park.

On 23 June 2012, Google featured an interactive doodle where visitors had to change the instructions of a Turing Machine, so when run, the symbols on the tape would match a provided sequence, featuring "Google" in Baudot-Murray code.

The Bletchley Park Trust collaborated with Winning Moves to publish an Alan Turing edition of the board game Monopoly. The game's squares and cards have been revised to tell the story of Turing's life, from his birthplace in Maida Vale to Hut 8 at Bletchley Park. The game also includes a replica of an original hand-drawn board created by William Newman, son of Turing's mentor, Max Newman, which Turing played on in the 1950s.

In the Philippines, the Department of Philosophy at De La Salle University-Manila hosted Turing 2012, an international conference on philosophy, artificial intelligence, and cognitive science from 27 to 28 March 2012 to commemorate the centenary birth of Turing. Madurai, India held celebrations with a programme attended by 6,000 students.

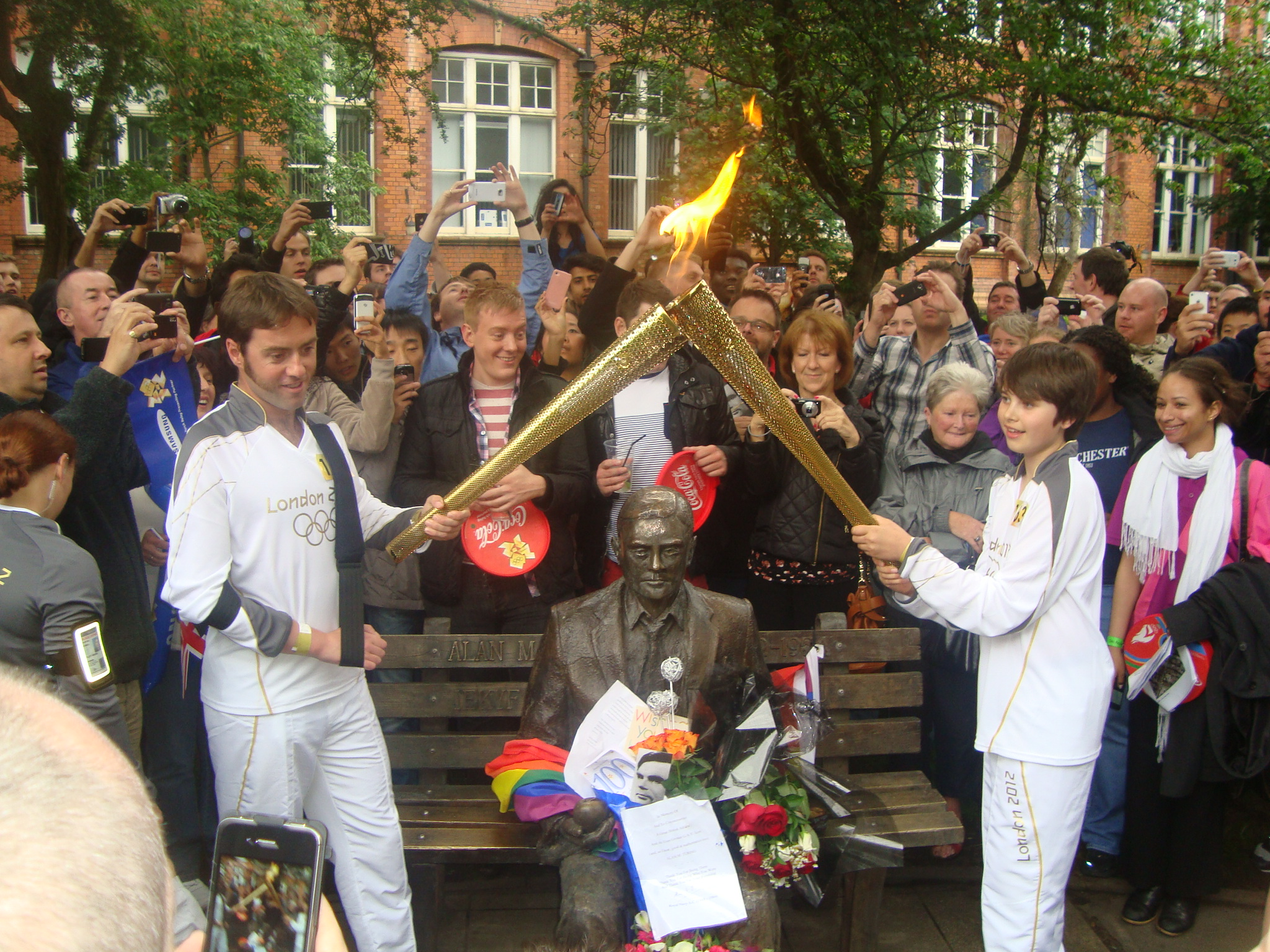
The London 2012 Olympic Torch flame was passed on in front of Turing's statue in Manchester on his 100th birthday.

There was a three-day conference in Manchester in June, the Alan Turing Centenary Conference, a two-day conference in San Francisco, organised by the ACM, and a birthday party and Turing Centenary Conference in Cambridge organised at King's College, Cambridge, and the University of Cambridge, the latter organised by the association Computability in Europe.

The Science Museum in London launched a free exhibition devoted to Turing's life and achievements in June 2012, to run until July 2013. In February 2012, the Royal Mail issued a stamp featuring Turing as part of its "Britons of Distinction" series. The London 2012 Olympic Torch flame was passed on in front of Turing's statue in Sackville Gardens, Manchester, on the evening of 23 June 2012, the 100th anniversary of his birth.

On 22 June 2012, Manchester City Council, in partnership with the Lesbian and Gay Foundation, launched the Alan Turing Memorial Award, which will recognise individuals or groups who have made a significant contribution to the fight against homophobia in Manchester.

At the University of Oxford, a new course in Computer Science and Philosophy was established to coincide with the centenary of Turing's birth.

Previous events have included a celebration of Turing's life and achievements, at the University of Manchester, arranged by the British Logic Colloquium and the British Society for the History of Mathematics on 5 June 2004.

== Portrayals ==
=== Animation ===
- In the web series Super Science Friends, Turing is featured as a side character that helps inventor Nikola Tesla.

=== Biographies ===
- Alan Turing: The Enigma is a 1983 biography of Turing by British mathematician Andrew Hodges.
- Prof: Alan Turing Decoded is a 2015 biography of Turing by his nephew Dermot Turing.
- The Turing Guide is a 2017 book covering Turing's life and work by Jack Copeland et al.

=== In cyberspace ===
- In the shared alternate history of Ill Bethisad (1997 and after), Alan Turing was a mathematician, computer scientist, logician, etc. in much the same way as reality. Like his real-life counterpart, the fictional alternate universe version of Turing devised the Turing machine and the "Turing" version of the Church–Turing thesis. During the "Second Great War" (the equivalent of World War II), Turing worked for the British government, breaking codes produced by the German Enigma machine by a machine partially created by him called the "Bombe".

=== In theatre ===
- Breaking the Code is a 1986 play by Hugh Whitemore about Turing. The play ran in London's West End beginning in November 1986 and on Broadway from 15 November 1987 to 10 April 1988. In these performances, Turing was played by Derek Jacobi. The Broadway production was nominated for three Tony Awards including Best Actor in a Play, Best Featured Actor in a Play, and Best Direction of a Play, and for two Drama Desk Awards, for Best Actor and Best Featured Actor. Turing was again portrayed by Jacobi in the 1996 television film adaptation of Breaking the Code.
- In 2012, in honour of the Turing Centennial, American Lyric Theater commissioned an operatic exploration of the life and death of Turing from composer Justine F. Chen and librettist David Simpatico. Titled The Life and Death(s) of Alan Turing, the opera is a historical fantasia on the life of Turing. In November 2014, the opera and several other artistic works inspired by Turing's life were featured on Studio 360. The opera received its first public performance in January 2017. In February 2019, Chicago Opera Theater presented the orchestra workshop, and on March 23 & 25, 2023, the company presented the fully staged world premiere at the Harris Theater for Music and Dance in Chicago, IL.

=== In literature ===
- Turing was the subject of a clerihew written by the pupils of his alma mater, Sherborne School in England:

Turing
Must have been alluring
To get made a don
So early on.

- In William Gibson's 1984 Neuromancer, the Turing police are an international agency with jurisdiction over AIs.
- Turing is featured in the Neal Stephenson 1999 novel Cryptonomicon.
- The 2000 Doctor Who novel The Turing Test features Turing and the writer Graham Greene.
- The 2006 novel A Madman Dreams of Turing Machines contrasts fictionalised accounts of the lives and ideas of Turing and Kurt Gödel.
- The 2009 novel Fall of Man in Wilmslow by David Lagercrantz is a fictional account of the investigation of Alan Turing's death written from the point of view of the investigating police officer.
- The 2015 novel Speak, written by Louisa Hall, includes a series of fictional letters written from Turing to his best friend's mother throughout his life, detailing his research about artificial intelligence.
- In the graphic novel series Über, in which a fictionalised version of the Second World War plays out, involving superhuman soldiers called "Tank-Men": Turing is one of the researchers as well as a Tank-Man himself.
- Turing is featured in Ian McEwan's 2019 novel, Machines Like Me ISBN 978-1787331662.

=== In music ===
- Electronic music duo Matmos released an EP titled For Alan Turing in 2006, which was based on material commissioned by Dr. Robert Osserman and David Elsenbud of the Mathematical Sciences Research Institute. In one of its tracks, an original Enigma Machine is sampled.
- In 2012, Spanish group Hidrogenesse dedicated their LP Un dígito binario dudoso. Recital para Alan Turing (A dubious binary digit. Concert for Alan Turing) to the memory of the mathematician.
- A musical work inspired by Turing's life, written by Neil Tennant and Chris Lowe of the Pet Shop Boys, entitled A Man from the Future, was announced in late 2013. It was performed by the Pet Shop Boys and Juliet Stevenson (narrator), the BBC Singers, and the BBC Concert Orchestra conducted by Dominic Wheeler at the BBC Proms in the Royal Albert Hall on 23 July 2014.
- Codebreaker is also the title of a choral work by the composer James McCarthy. It includes settings of texts by the poets Wilfred Owen, Sara Teasdale, Walt Whitman, Oscar Wilde and Robert Burns that are used to illustrate aspects of Turing's life. It was premiered on 26 April 2014 at the Barbican Centre in London, where it was performed by the Hertfordshire Chorus, who commissioned the work, led by David Temple with the soprano soloist Naomi Harvey providing the voice of Turing's mother.
- Turing, a two-act opera with music by Anno Schreier and libretto by Georg Holzer. Premiere 26 November 2022 at the Nürnberg Staatstheater, conducted by Guido Johannes Rumstadt, with Martin Platz in the title role.

=== In film ===
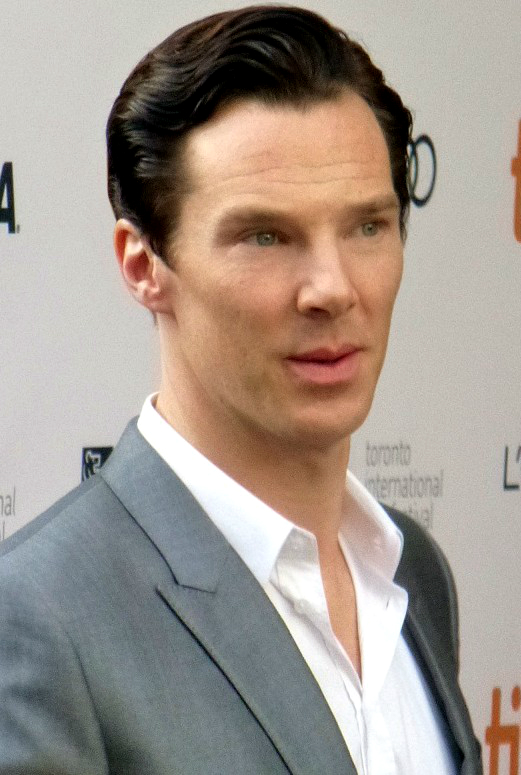
Benedict Cumberbatch portrayed Turing in the 2014 film The Imitation Game

- Codebreaker, original UK title Britain's Greatest Codebreaker, is a TV film that aired on 21 November 2011 by Channel 4 about Turing's life. It had a limited release in the US beginning on 17 October 2012. The story is told as a discussion between Turing and his psychiatrist Dr. Franz Greenbaum. The story is based on journals maintained by Greenbaum and others who have studied Turing's life as well as some of his colleagues.
- The historical drama film The Imitation Game, directed by Morten Tyldum and starring Benedict Cumberbatch as Turing and Keira Knightley as Joan Clarke, was released in the UK on 14 November 2014 and released theatrically in the US on 28 November 2014. The story, loosely based on Hodges' 1983 biography, concentrates on the period of Turing's life where he breaks the Enigma code with other codebreakers in Bletchley Park. It received the Academy Award for Best Adapted Screenplay in 2015. It was a tremendous success, bringing in $233.6 million for a production cost of $14 million.
