= 42–44 Sackville Street =

Listed building in Manchester, England

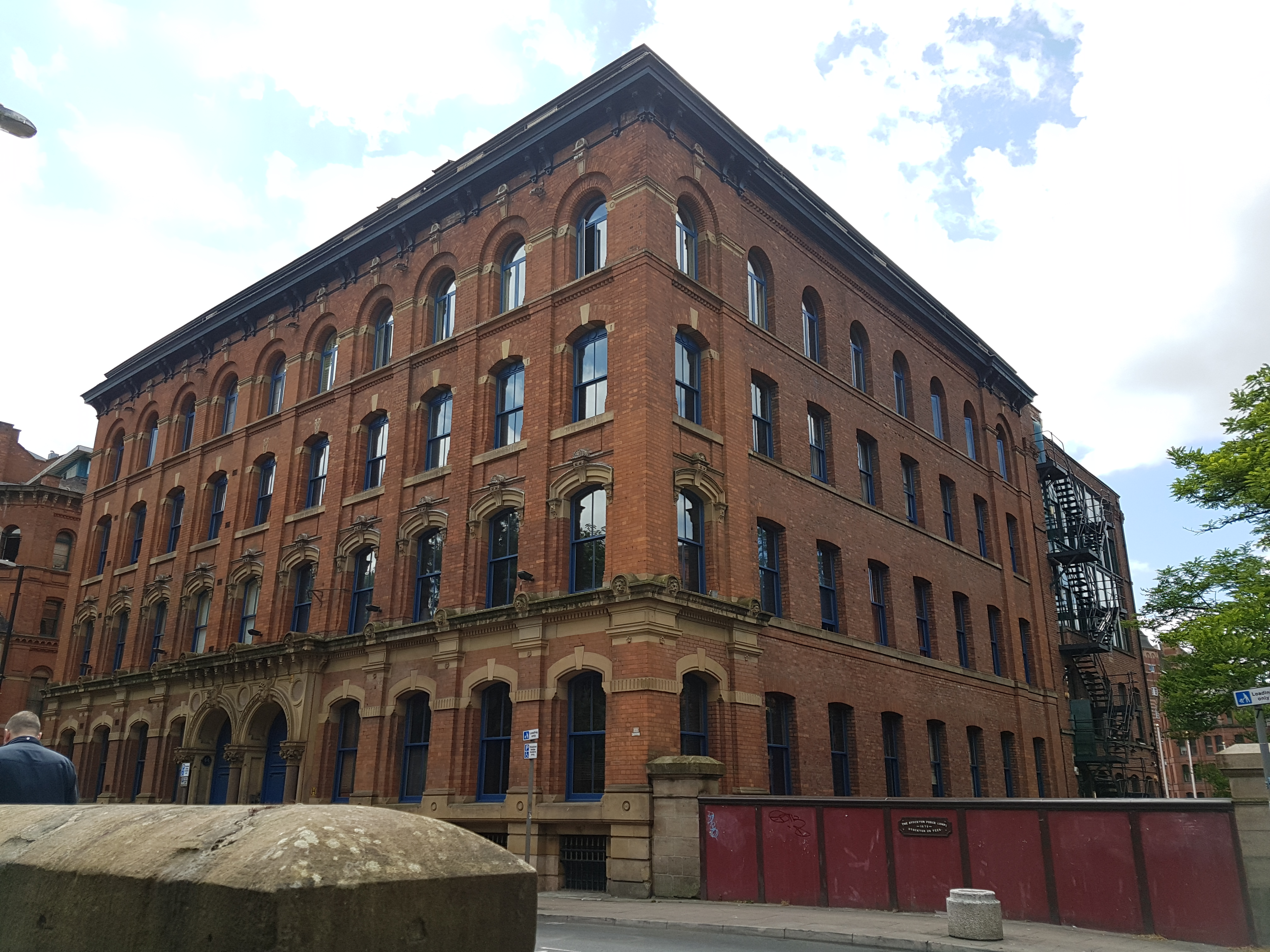
- 42–44 Sackville Street, Manchester
- Interactive map of the 42–44 Sackville Street area

General information
- Architectural style: Georgian style
- Location: 42–44 Sackville Street, Manchester, England
- Coordinates: 53.4766°N 2.2370°W
- Year built: c. 1860–1880

Technical details
- Material: Brick, sandstone
- Floor count: 5 (incl. basement)

Design and construction
- Architecture firm: Pennington and Bridgen
- Designations

Listed Building – Grade II
- Official name: 42 and 44, Sackville Street
- Designated: 3 October 1974
- Reference no.: 1270791

42–44 Sackville Street, known originally as Sackville House with originally two separate entrances, 42 and 44 Sackville Street, is a four-storey over basement Grade II listed building in Manchester, England. It is situated in the City Centre ward, and is delimited by Sackville Street to the east, the Rochdale Canal and Canal Street to the north, and Brazil Street to the south. It is adjoined on the west side by Amazon House, and faces Sackville Gardens.

It was built during the expansion of the city, after the Rochdale Canal was opened in 1804, which it is alongside. Its purpose was rental as several company offices.

It is the first 19th-century warehouse in Manchester to have been converted into New York-style residential loft apartments in the 20th century.

== Style ==
It was designed in 1870 by Pennington and Bridgen, architects and surveyors, of Essex Chambers, 8 Essex Street, Manchester M2 (at the crossing with King Street), in a rectangular and symmetrical late Georgian style, and made of brick and sandstone. Twin front doors each have a Roman head keystone, probably of Janus, the god of doorways.

Unlike many other buildings of the time, it did not have its name or the date of construction featuring on the building itself.

There was a goods entry on the south side and metal tracks leading into the building, where the car park entrance now is. The ground floor had hoists for lifting and moving goods, some of which still remain. Goods could be brought and collected by barge on the Rochdale Canal.

It is not known who owned the building or how funds were raised to build it.

== Uses, occupiers and ownership ==
The street index archives at Manchester Central Library show the building being occupied from 1876.

By 1969, 153 firms had been in the building, for periods ranging from one year to the longest standing company, Greatorex & Co. Ltd., present for 94 years from 1876 and still there in 1969, with an ongoing Companies House listing as Greatorex (Manchester) Ltd after that. The second-longest standing company was there for 46 years, Pickering and Berthoud. For the first 10 years, there were typically six companies in the building, then 10 until 1932 onwards when the norm was 15.

The companies mostly named after their owner, show origins in countries including Greece, Turkey, Armenia, Portugal, Germany, Italy, with several names of Jewish descent. Markets served were specific by company, including the Levant, Constantinople, India, the United States, and normally the one from which the head of the firm was from.

Looking at the variations in the names of the businesses, it is possible to see how they included or were handed over to sons, partners appeared and disappeared or took over, and new branches were started so as to diversify.

Although the great majority of firms were connected to the textile industry, exceptions included the Portuguese Vice-Consulate from 1896 to 1922, and in later years the North West Arts Association. Possibly the most famous company name was the Singer sewing machine company.

In the 1960s, the building was bought by Sunderland Investments Ltd., led by businessman Oussama Lababedi.

The building was Grade II listed in October 1974.

== In popular culture ==
The building has been regularly featured in shoots for film and television, including:

- This Life (BBC, 1996)
- Village Voices (Channel 4 documentary) (Channel 4, 1997)
- Cold Feet (ITV, 1998)
- Queer as Folk (Channel 4, 1999)
- Sinchronicity (BBC 3, 2006)
- The Good Housekeeping Guide (BBC, 2006)
- Kellogg's advert for Make Time for Breakfast/National Breakfast Week (2011)
- Cucumber (Red Productions for Channel 4, 2015)
- Genius (Summit Entertainment, 2016) starring Nicole Kidman, Laura Linney, Colin Firth and Jude Law
- Tip Toe (Channel 4, 2026), starring Alan Cumming

== Former residents ==
- Simon Nicks a.k.a. Nicksy (deceased) Key 103 / Galaxy Radio Radio DJ
- Martin Hancock, actor, a.k.a. 'Spider' in Coronation Street (ITV)
- Beverley Callard, Coronation Street actress (ITV)
- Damian Lewis OBE, actor
- Carol Ainscow (deceased), director of building developer Artisan Holdings
- Peter Dalton, director of building developer Artisan Holdings
- Belinda Scandal, drag queen

== Further sources of information ==
- Manchester Library General website: http://www.manchester.gov.uk/info/448/archives_and_local_history
- Manchester Library Booking for archives/special collections: www.manchester.gov.uk/libraries
- Archives Catalogue: www.gmlives.org.uk
- Local Images Collection: www.images.manchester.gov.uk
- Images including Canal Street http://images.manchester.gov.uk/ResultsList.php?session=pass&QueryName=BasicQuery&QueryPage=%2Findex.php%3Fsession%3Dpass&Anywhere=SummaryData%7CAdmWebMetadata&QueryTerms=canal+street&QueryOption=Anywhere&StartAt=321
- Images including Sackville Street: http://images.manchester.gov.uk/ResultsList.php?session=pass&QueryName=BasicQuery&QueryPage=%2Findex.php%3Fsession%3Dpass&Anywhere=SummaryData%7CAdmWebMetadata&QueryTerms=sackville+street&QueryOption=Anywhere&StartAt=321
- Archives+: www.archivesplus.org
- Flickr: www.flickr.com/photos/manchesterarchiveplus
