= Jenny-Anne Bishop =

Welsh transgender rights activist (born 1946)

Jenny-Anne Bishop OBE
- Born: April 1946 (age 80); London
- Education: City University London (BA)

Jenny-Anne Bishop OBE (born April 1946) is a Welsh transgender activist. She formerly worked for the LGBT Foundation, and was an organiser and trustee for Sparkle. She is the current chair of Unique, a transgender support group based in North Wales.

== Personal life and education ==
Bishop was born in South West London, and spent her childhood in Surrey and Kent. She was raised as a Roman catholic. As a child, Bishop knew that they wanted to be a girl. She borrowed her mother’s and sisters’ clothes, feeling more confident in them. Her parents and teachers were disapproving, calling such behaviour naughty, and wicked. When she was six, her parents took her to see the school’s psychiatrist, who told her parents that it was just a phase.

Bishop studied at the City University London, graduating in 1969 with a degree in Industrial Chemistry. It was while studying in the university's library that she first discovered that transgender people existed. She spoke to her tutors about it, but found them dismissive, telling her that "People like you don't do that." They advised her to instead get married, and that the thoughts would go away. After graduating, she began working as a sales and marketing manager, selling scientific instruments.

Bishop married a woman in 1969, when she was 23. The couple were married for 31 years and raised two children together. Her wife was initially accepting of Bishop’s crossdressing and helped alter clothes for them. Initially, her wife thought it was a phase and that Bishop would get bored with crossdressing. When she realised Bishop intended to continue, she became depressed and almost ended the relationship. Bishop promised to her that she wouldn't transition during their marriage, as they didn’t want to put their family through the turmoil. She began attending a support group once a week, and would occasionally go clubbing in Manchester, using the opportunities to wear feminine clothing.

In the 70s, Bishop was outed to her workplace by a police officer, after they performed a traffic stop and were shocked to find Bishop wearing feminine clothing. They questioned if Bishop should be driving a company vehicle while "dressed like that". The officer rang Bishop's workplace, triggering harassment from her work colleagues. Eventually she was dismissed from the job and struggled to hold another as she was repeatedly outed in her workplaces.

In 1970 Bishop came out as transgender to their family, who were unsupportive. She has also spoken about being outed to her family by her wife in 1979. She saw John Randall at Charing Cross Hospital in 1980, and was diagnosed with gender dysphoria.

Bishop's repeated job losses took a toll on the family, and Bishop’s wife divorced her in 2000. Both her ex-wife, and children were unsupportive of Bishop’s transition, and Bishop hasn’t been in contact with them since the divorce. Bishop came out publicly as transgender in 2007, and began living as a woman full-time. She experienced repeated transphobia during this time, with her car being damaged, and hateful messages being painted on her house. She underwent gender-affirming surgery in 2010. In 2011, she married Elen Heart, who Bishop met at a New Year’s party in 2003. Together they run a community house for transgender people.

Bishop underwent facial feminisation surgery and a breast augmentation on Channel 4’s Embarrassing Bodies. Speaking about her experiences with the show later, she shared that she was delighted with the surgical results but also struggled to negotiate with the production team about the size of her breast implants. “We had a big argument about how big they should be [...] and when they did the surgery they tried to put the bigger ones in… the television company wanted big boobs...”

== Activism ==
Bishop has been a prominent transgender rights activist throughout her life. She has run awareness training courses for North Wales Police, Betsi Cadwaladr University Health Board, and Flintshire County Council. In 2012, she was appointed to the Westminster Parliamentary Forum on Gender Identity. Bishop has previously served as an organiser and trustee for Sparkle (charity).

She is the current chair and outreach coordinator for Unique, a transgender support group based in North Wales. Bishop also serves on the board of directors for Manchester Metropolitan Church, and also serves as a lay pastoral leader within the church.

She contributed to the Museum of Liverpool's 2013 exhibition, April Ashley: Portrait of a lady. Bishop provided training to the team involved with the exhibition, and connected them with local trans people who shared their own life stories that featured alongside Ashley’s.

She has worked with the LGBT Foundation and previously chaired TransForum Manchester, a transgender peer support group that used to meet once a month in the LGBT Foundation's Manchester offices. In 2013 TransForum began working with the Greater Manchester Police to research transgender people's interactions with the police and their experience when reporting hate crimes. The research was published during Hate Crime Awareness Week in 2016.

=== LGBT elder activism ===
Bishop has been a staunch advocate for older LGBTQ+ people, and has contributed to a variety of research on the subject.

Bishop helped run The Rainbow Project, which was awarded funding in 2010. The project was organised by Merseyside LGBT+ activists, who were interested in what difficulties elderly LGBT+ people faced, especially when it came to residential care. The project highlighted the impact that homophobia and transphobia had on care home residents. They found that LGBT+ residents were frequently reallocated to different rooms to placate other residents, who held homophobic views. Residents who were open about their sexuality sometimes found themselves excluded from conversations and struggled with depression. Some began taking antidepressants or moved care homes, as they found staff unhelpful and unwilling to intervene.

== Awards ==
In 2005 Bishop was crowned Miss Golden Sparkle. She was awarded Volunteer of the Year at the 2014 LGBT Foundation's Homo Hero awards. In 2015 Bishop was awarded an OBE for her work within the transgender community. She was shortlisted for the 2019 Diva Awards, under the "Unsung Hero's" category. In 2025, she was featured on Wales Online's Pinc List, as a national treasure.
