= Sparkle (charity) =

Transgender rights charity

- Sparkle logo
- Formation: 10 June 2005; 21 years ago
- Legal status: Charity
- Purpose: Transgender rights
- Region served: United Kingdom
- Chair of Trustees: Jay Crawford
- Website: www.sparkle.org.uk

Sparkle - the national transgender charity is a volunteer-led registered Charity based in the United Kingdom. Sparkle is best known for organising the annual Sparkle Weekend in Manchester, which aims to celebrate the transgender, non-binary and gender non-conforming community. The event is the UK's longest running celebration of its kind. Sparkle Weekend 2026 is currently scheduled to occur on 26th to 28th June 2026, in Sackville Gardens, Manchester UK.

Sparkle also runs a monthly wellbeing event, called Sparkle Sanctuary. The event focuses on providing a safe wellbeing space for the transgender, non-binary and gender non-confirming community.

== History ==
Sparkle was formed in 2005 by Kimberly Nolan and was granted registered charity status in 2011 by board member Sophie Summers.

The event moved to online-only during the global COVID-19 pandemic in 2020 and 2021, but went back to in-person events at Sackville Street, Manchester, in 2022.

== Sparkle Weekend ==
Sparkle Weekend occurs in either June or July. The 21st event is currently scheduled for 26th to 28th June 2026. The 20th event was held between 27th to 29th June 2025. The 19th event was celebrated from 12th to 14th July 2024 and the 18th event from 7th to 9th July 2023, where over 12,000 people attended. It is based around Manchester's Canal Street, with local bars and restaurants sponsoring and advertising the event, and various talks and workshops are run. On the Friday evening, Saturday and Sunday, Sackville Gardens hosts a stage and well-being, family and sober spaces along with a well attended marketplace showcasing the best in trans retail and information from adjacent organisations.

== Transgender Day of Remembrance (TDoR) ==
Sparkle also hosts the Manchester Transgender Day of Remembrance in Sackville Gardens, Manchester. This started in 2022 as a collaboration with other individuals, running every November on the Sunday nearest to the 20th to remember victims of transphobic crime as part of the Transgender Day of Remembrance.

Following community consultations in 2023, the hosting of the event moved to a collaborative effort with other charities, non-profits and adjacent organisations. The event has since been hosted in collaboration with Manchester Trans Pride, Not a Phase, Sparkle and TransCreative.

== Other activities ==
In addition to organising the Sparkle Weekend, the charity aims to promote awareness and acceptance of the Transgender community. In November 2022, Sparkle organised a candle-lit vigil to remember victims of transphobic crime as part of the Transgender Day of Remembrance. Every year they continue this service to see the growth and change in support for the trans community and to remember those who were ‘known to us’.

Sparkle are also responsible for the National Transgender memorial project, commencing a replacement of the original monument following an incident of vandalism where it was found to be irreparable following fire damage.

In 2024, Sparkle started an initiative called Sparkle Sanctuary, which provides a safe community for transgender, non-binary and gender non-conforming people in Manchester. The event runs on the last Sunday of each month, and provides both free meals and activities such as crafts, knitting, plant repotting workshops, meditation and yoga sessions. Every third event is opened up to community allies.

In 2025, Sparkle announced a collaboration with non-profit organisation The Placard People (formerly known as LazyPins) for branding and merchandise. Sparkle has collaborated with The Placard People for previous Sparkle Weekend and Manchester Pride events.

== Trustees and Patrons ==
Sparkle has a governing body of trustees who are led by Jay Crawford (Chair). Sparkle currently has two patrons Professor Stephen Whittle OBE and Actress Annie Wallace.

== See also ==
- Anti-transgender movement in the United Kingdom
- List of transgender-related topics
- List of transgender-rights organizations
- Transgender Day of Remembrance
- Transgender rights in the United Kingdom
