= Manchester Pride =

British LGBTQ+ organisation

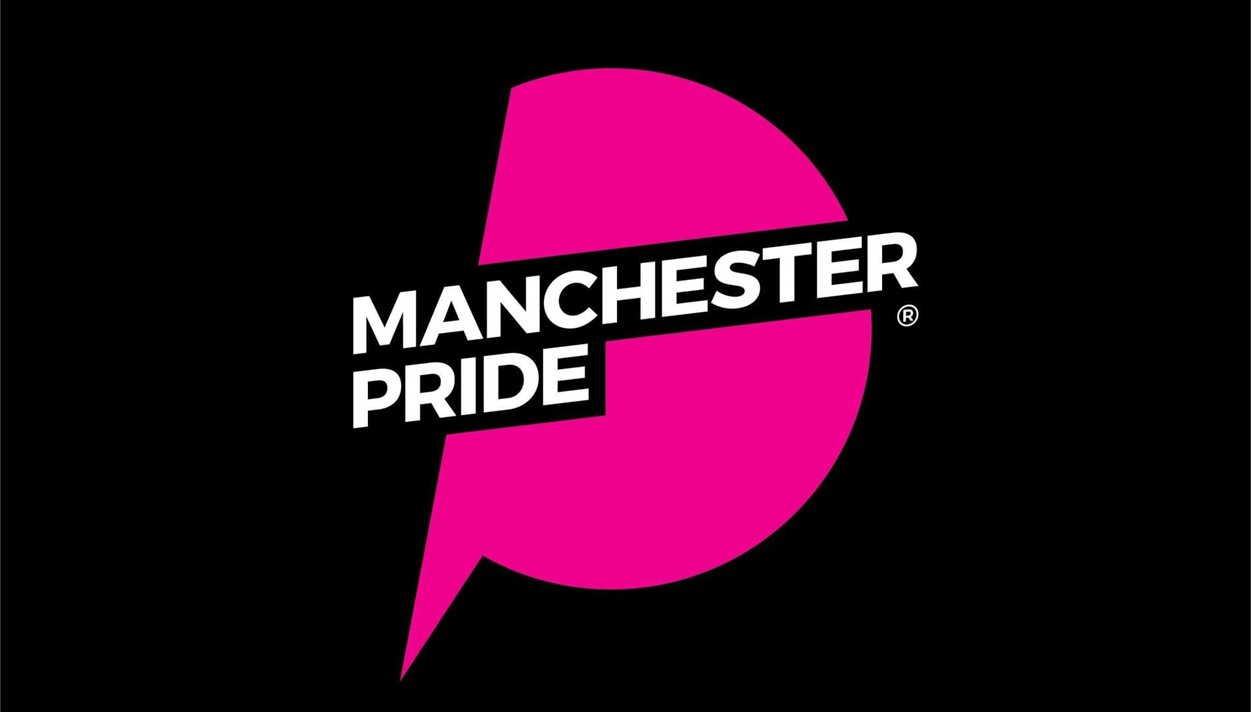
- Logo
- Formation: 20 February 1985; 41 years ago
- Founded at: Canal Street, Manchester
- Type: Nonprofit
- Registration no.: Registered Charity 1117848
- Headquarters: Piccadilly Gardens
- Board Chair: David McGovern
- Vice Chair: Mick Lawlor
- CEO: Mark Fletcher
- Main organ: Board of Trustees
- Subsidiaries: Manchester Pride Limited, Manchester Pride Events Limited
- Revenue: £3.2 million
- Staff: 10
- Volunteers: Approx. 242
- Website: www.manchesterpride.com

Manchester Pride is a charity and a limited company that campaigns for LGBTQ+ equality across the United Kingdom, predominantly in Greater Manchester. The charity offers dialogue, training, research and policy analysis, advocacy and outreach activities focusing on LGBTQ+ rights.

Manchester Pride's headquarters are in Piccadilly Gardens, Manchester city centre. Manchester Pride had a total income of £3,238,817 in the financial year ending 31 December 2021, had 10 employees and used the services of 242 volunteers. It has sponsorships with companies Virgin Atlantic, TikTok, Starbucks, Marc Jacobs and L'Oréal.

The organisation is managed by a Board of Trustees who are, in turn, Directors of Manchester Pride Limited and Manchester Pride Events Limited.

In October 2025 it was reported that the organisation was insolvent and about to enter into administration with considerable debts.

== History ==
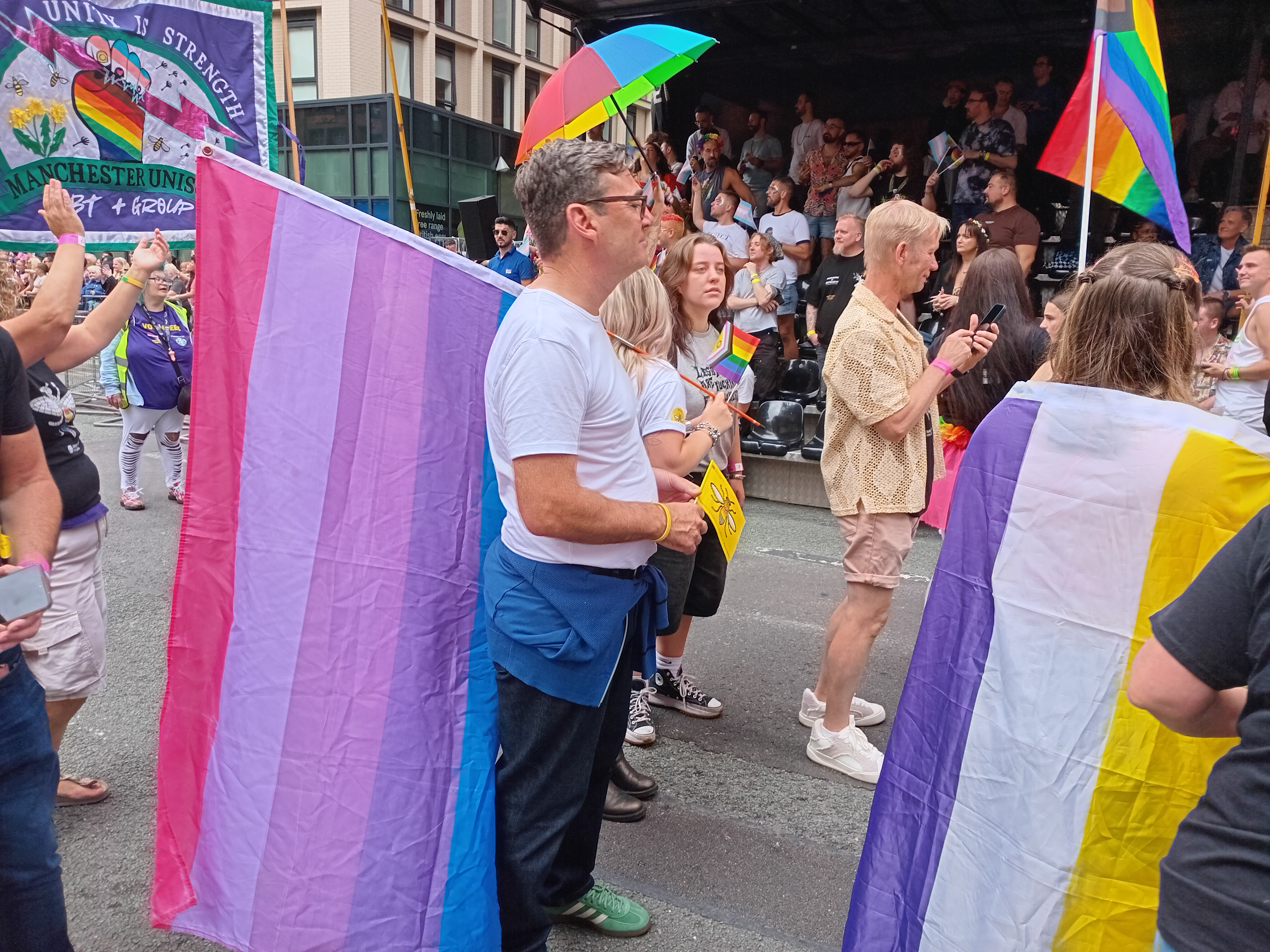
Future Prime Minister Andy Burnham attending Manchester Pride parade in 2025

An event commenced on August bank holiday 1985 in the gay village, with the support of new Labour Party councillors, elected 1984 who gave the gay community their support and appointed a Lesbian and Gay officer, a move inspired by Ken Livingstone. By 1986 Manchester City Council had provided £1,700 in funding to hold an event at Oxford Street, the bars got together to raise money for AIDS organisations in the city with a lot of support from the gay community; it started as a very small but was the start of a more organised gay community, in a time of hostility from police. In 1989 events were for fund raising to provide furnishings for the ward at Monsall Hospital where people received treatment for HIV / AIDS, by 1991 the Village Charity was established and ran the festival then known as Manchester Mardi Gras, 'The Festival of Fun' it raised £15,000. By this time it had expanded to include a full programme of activities from Friday to Monday with a market held in Sackville Park and a fireworks display, funds came from the North West Development Agency. By 1997 the event was notably popular with people of all backgrounds in society, and by 2002 there were 100,000 in attendance.

Since 2003 the gay village has been an enclosed event space across the Manchester Pride weekend, and a pledge-band is needed to access some programmed events and selected Village venues. The funds raised from the sale of pledge-bands helps Manchester Pride achieve its charitable objectives which includes celebrating LGBTQ+ life while providing a platform and employment for local LGBTQ+ people.

In 2003, Manchester hosted 'EuroPride'. The ten-day event consisted of sports, music, dance and other cultural activities which culminated in the August bank holiday event termed as 'The Big Weekend'. Later, Manchester Pride continued to organise 'The Big Weekend' and became a registered charity outfit in 2007 (charity number 1117848). Manchester Pride organises an annual program for all members of the LGBTQ+ community.

In 2013 the charity had loss of more than £16,000 and in 2014 Manchester Pride invited people from the LGBTQ+ community to help shape the way the organisation is run. by 2016 the event raised £149,000 for the Manchester Pride Fund, with The Big Weekend drawing over 170,000 visitors. In 2017 the event raised £161,000 for LGBTQ+ charities in Greater Manchester. The parade had over 4,000 participants and nearly 150 entries and attracted tens of thousands of spectators to the city centre. Manchester is the first such parade to include the police, the army and the NHS among its floats. In 2019, it was estimated that 170,000 visitors would attend during the weekend.

2019 saw elements of the Manchester Pride four-day August bank holiday festival take place away from the Village when the music stage is moved to the site of the former Manchester Mayfield railway station. 'The Big Weekend' has been replaced by a ticketed event for 2019, with an entry fee of £71.

In 2022, the concert element of the event was dropped after a consultation with the LGBT+ community amid concerns about how the charity is run found that MCR Pride Live, as the concert was to be called, was considered less important whilst the parade, the Candlelit Vigil, the Gay Village Party, Superbia Weekend, Youth Pride MCR, Family Pride MCR and Human Rights Forum were identified as vital elements of Manchester Pride. Manchester Pride live returned for the 2023 event.

== Controversy ==
Historically, Manchester Pride has received criticism from within the LGBT community, dating as far back as 2007 and beyond.

In August 2021, CEO Mark Fletcher was grilled on BBC Radio Manchester over the organisation's decision to "cut ties" with local charities the LGBT Foundation and George House Trust. Although he denied the claims, stating that Manchester Pride intended to continue funding their schemes, the charities responded with a joint statement denying this, saying at the time: "Hearing that Manchester Pride will continue to fund LGBT Foundation and St George Trust on the radio earlier today contradicts the conversations we have had about our long-standing funding agreements which have been ended by them. We have not been given any indication of what future funding might look like or on what terms."

A drop in charitable donations was put down to a loss of revenue in the wake of COVID-19. However, critics pointed out that the organisation's charitable contributions had dropped before the pandemic, too.

According to BBC Radio Manchester, in 2018 Manchester Pride donated nearly £150,000 to charity, around six per cent of its revenue. In 2019 it made a record-breaking £3.94 million, yet its charitable contributions were halved to three per cent, amounting to just £122,000.

The 2019 event featured a headline performance from Ariana Grande. Her reported fee of £350,000 for performing accounted for nearly three times the money handed to local charities.

As charitable donations steadily dropped, the Chief Executive also took a £20,000 increase in pay. Fletcher faced calls to resign with a petition being set up by disgruntled campaigners; the petition received over 2,000 signatures in less than 48 hours.

== See also ==
- LGBT Foundation
- Stonewall
- Pride in London
- Birmingham Pride
- Manchester Day
