= Annie Wallace =

Scottish actress (born 1965)

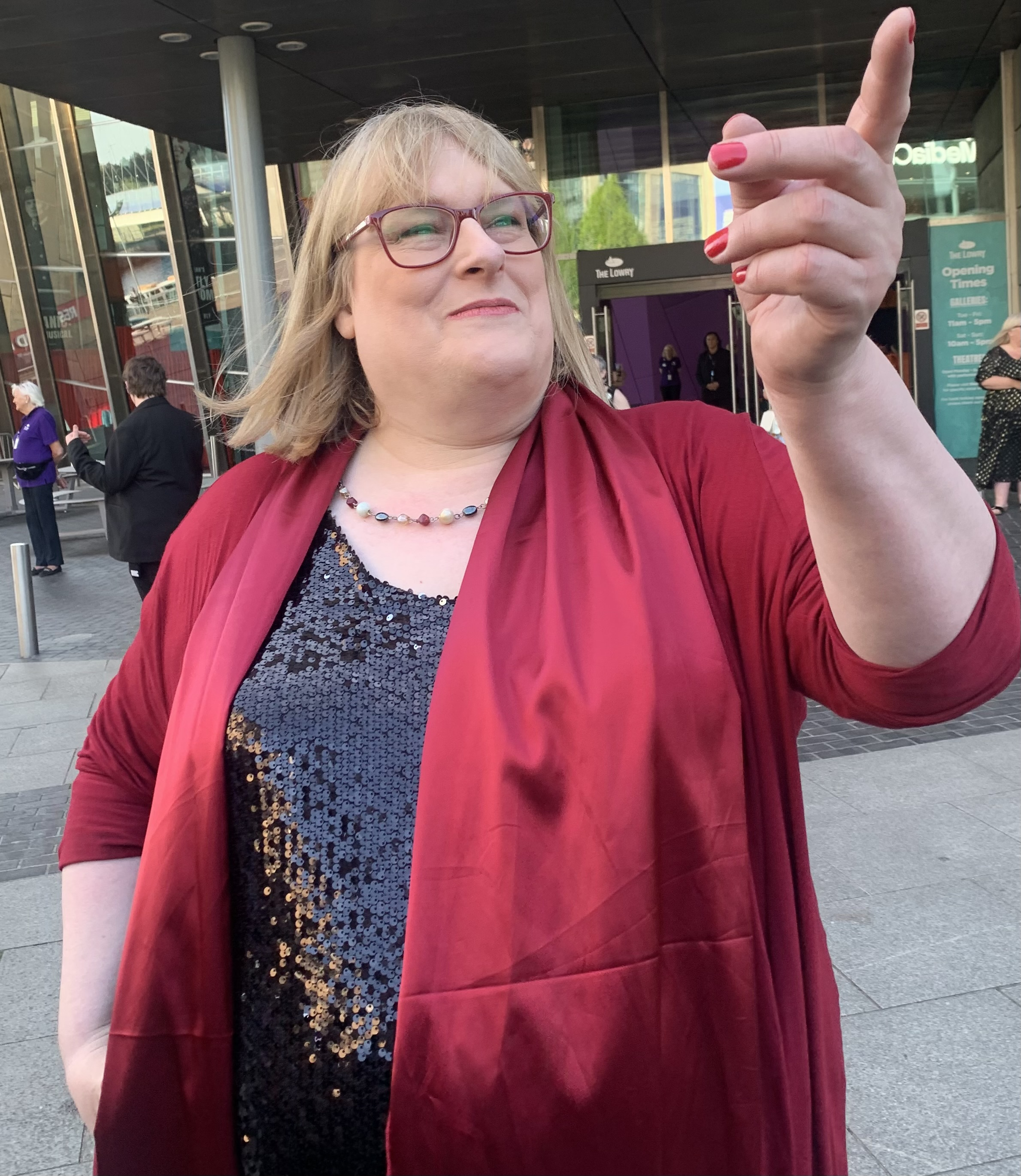
- Wallace in 2023
- Born: 6 May 1965 (age 61); Aberdeen, Scotland, United Kingdom
- Education: Manchester School of Theatre
- Occupation: Actress
- Years active: 2004–present
- Known for: Role of Sally St. Claire in Hollyoaks
- Website: anniewallace.com

Annie Wallace (born 6 May 1965) is a Scottish actress, best known for playing Sally St. Claire in the Channel 4 soap opera Hollyoaks between 2015 and 2024. She was the first transgender person to portray a regular transgender character in British soap opera history.

== Life and career ==
Wallace was previously a member of the National Youth Theatre in 1981, but she temporarily stopped acting to work in computer science and sound engineering. She spent eighteen months as a research assistant for the ITV soap opera Coronation Street, from 1998 to 2000, where she advised for and inspired the character of Hayley Patterson, played by actress Julie Hesmondhalgh.

Inspired by her time at ITV Granada, she auditioned successfully for the Manchester School of Theatre in 2001, graduating in 2004. She then appeared in various Manchester theatre productions, including Withnail and I and Wyrd Sisters.

In 2011, Wallace appeared in an episode of Shameless as school headmistress Miss Heller.

Wallace is also a musician, with two albums written and recorded with collaborator John Beresford.

She has also worked on several podcast comedy series, as well as sound and video design for various theatrical productions.

On 9 October 2015, it was announced that she would be joining the Channel 4 soap opera Hollyoaks, in a new regular role as Sally St. Claire. Wallace made her debut appearance on-screen on 29 October 2015.

On 5 January 2018, Wallace took part in an edition of Celebrity Mastermind, where her specialist subject was "Doctor Who – 1970–1980". She came in second place with 21 points, losing to journalist Martin Bell with 24 points. Her chosen charity was Mermaids.

On 27 May 2023, she appeared on Pointless Celebrities, partnering with former Hollyoaks actor Devon Anderson, and managed to get through to the head-to-head section, but did not advance to the final.

She departed Hollyoaks on 11 September 2024, along with several other cast members, when Channel 4 cut the episodes from five per week to three, requiring cuts to the cast, crew and production staff.

== Filmography ==
Year	Title	Role	Notes
2011	Shameless	Miss Heller	Episode: "Beginnings and Ends"
2013	Dream On	Barmaid	Film
2015–2024, 2026	Hollyoaks	Sally St. Claire	Regular role

== Awards and nominations ==
On 15 November 2015, she was placed at number 17 on the Rainbow List, published by The Independent on Sunday; a list of the most influential openly LGBTI individuals in the United Kingdom, published annually.

On 25 June 2016, Wallace was placed at number 39 on the Pride Power List, published by Out News Global as part of Pride in London; another list of in celebration of the achievements of 100 most influential lesbian, gay, bisexual, transgender and intersex people in Britain, voted for by the public.

On 16 September 2016, she won The National Diversity Awards "Celebrity of the Year" award, at Liverpool Cathedral. On the same day she was placed at No.38 on the DIVA Power List.

On 5 October 2016, she was nominated in the BAFTA Scotland Awards 2016 in the category of "Best Actress - Television" for her role in Hollyoaks; the first ever British transgender actress to be nominated for a BAFTA award.

On 2 October 2021 she was presented with the Judges Award for Outstanding Trans Activism at the Proud Scotland Awards.

On 26 April 2024, Wallace received a special honour at the DIVA Magazine Awards, celebrating their 30th anniversary. The honour was for her 30 years of activism, her advisory work on Coronation Street, and her work on Hollyoaks.

Year	Ceremony	Award	Nominated work	Result
2016	Sparkle National Transgender Awards	"Trans* Person in the Media/TV of the Year"	Hollyoaks as Sally St. Claire	Nominated
2016	The National Diversity Awards	"Celebrity of the Year"	Hollyoaks as Sally St. Claire	Won
2016	TV Choice Awards	"Best Soap Newcomer"	Hollyoaks as Sally St. Claire	Nominated
2016	Icon Awards	"Cultural Icon of the Year"	Hollyoaks as Sally St. Claire	Runner-up
2016	Digital Spy Soap Awards	"Biggest Unsung Hero"	Hollyoaks as Sally St. Claire	Nominated
2016	BAFTA Scotland Awards 2016	"Best Actress - Television"	Hollyoaks as Sally St. Claire	Nominated
2017	British LGBT Awards	"LGBT+ Celebrity Rising Star"	Hollyoaks as Sally St. Claire	Nominated
2018	TRIC Awards	"Best Soap Actor"	Hollyoaks as Sally St. Claire	Nominated
2021	Proud Scotland Awards	"The Judges Award"	for Outstanding Trans Activism	Won
2024	DIVA Awards	30th Anniversary Honouree	for Acting and Campaigning	Won
