= Speak (Hall novel) =

2015 novel by Louisa Hall

- First edition
- Author: Louisa Hall
- Language: English
- Genre: Literary Fiction, Science fiction
- Publisher: Ecco Books
- Publication date: 2015
- Publication place: United States
- Media type: Print (hardback & paperback)
- ISBN: 978-0-06-239119-3

Speak is a 2015 novel by Louisa Hall. It is her second novel, after The Carriage House. The novel was well received. The novel was inspired by a story in the New York Times.

== Reception ==
The novel received praise from critics. The plot was compared favorably with the work of David Mitchell.
