= Louisa Hall =

American novelist and poet (born 1982)

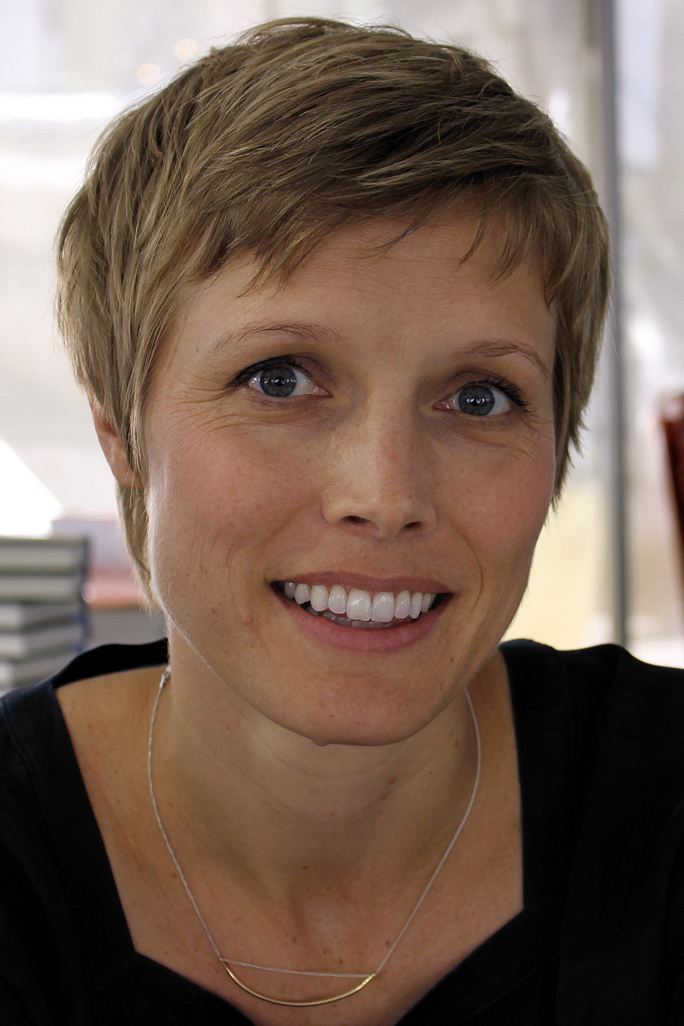
- Hall at the 2015 Texas Book Festival
- Born: Louisa Warren Hall; June 24, 1982 (age 44); Philadelphia, Pennsylvania, U.S.
- Education: Harvard University
- Occupation: Author
- Writing career
- Genres: Novel; Poetry

Medal record

Women's squash

Representing the United States

Pan American Games
Gold medal – first place	2003 Santo Domingo	Team

Louisa Warren Hall (born June 24, 1982) is an American novelist and poet. She has a Ph.D in literature from University of Texas at Austin, where she has taught literature and creative writing.

== Education and early life ==
Hall grew up outside Philadelphia in the suburb of Haverford. She attended Episcopal Academy, where she played squash. She was also involved in the community service program, the choir, and played the violin. Hall attended Harvard College, and graduated in 2004, earning a BA in English. Her master's thesis concerned the poetry of Thomas Hardy. Hall is one of several members of the Harvard women's squash team to have later gone on to write professionally. Others include Galt Niederhoffer and Ivy Pochoda.

She completed her PhD in English in 2013, at the University of Texas, where she subsequently taught.

== Career ==
=== Writing ===
Hall's first novel, The Carriage House, was published in 2013 by Scribner in the United States and by Viking in the UK. It garnered comparisons to John Cheever and Richard Yates. The novel is an adaptation of Jane Austen's 1818 novel Persuasion. However, the novel does not borrow its entire structure from Austen, and it is set outside Philadelphia.

Her second novel, Speak, was published in 2015 and addresses the complex relationship between humans and machines. The novel was well received. NPR said of Speak that "it almost seems like an understatement to call it a masterpiece." Speak garnered comparisons to Margaret Atwood and David Mitchell.

Hall is also a poet. Her poems have appeared in journals such as The New Republic and the Southwest Review.

Hall's third novel, Trinity, was shortlisted for the 2019 Dylan Thomas Prize.

Hall published Reproduction in 2023. The Guardian said that “the book’s triumph is to reveal, brilliantly and with feeling, the uncanny peculiarity of pregnancy and childbirth”.

=== Squash ===
Between 2004 and 2007 Hall played squash professionally. During her collegiate career, Louisa was Ivy League Rookie of the Year, Ivy League Player of the Year, four year First Team All American and Four year All Ivy. She also won a Pan American Games gold medal.

== Bibliography ==
- The Carriage House (2013)
- Speak (2015)
- Trinity (2018)
- Reproduction (2023), HarperCollins, ISBN 978-0-06-328363-3
