= Manchester Day =

Annual celebration of Greater Manchester in England

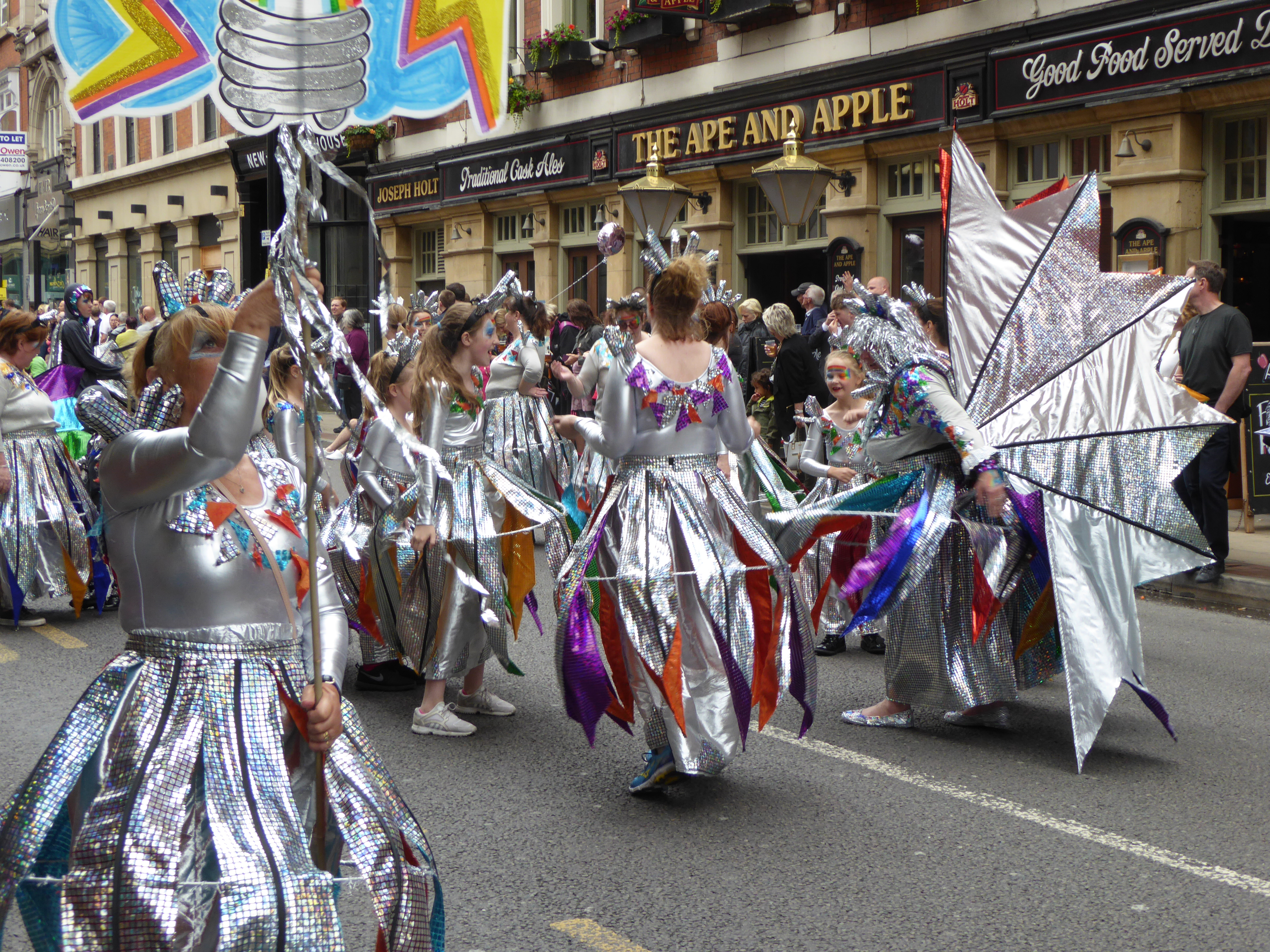
Costumes in the Manchester Day parade in 2016.

Manchester Day is an annual parade and celebration of Greater Manchester held in Manchester city centre, United Kingdom. The event has been held each June since 2010 and is commissioned by Manchester City Council and created by Walk the Plank.

The event is inspired by the New York Thanksgiving parade.

== History ==
Manchester Day started in 2010, being organized by the Manchester City Council with help from Walk the Plank and sporting organisations. The event brought an estimated 4 million pounds to the economy.

After the first Manchester Day was a success, the Manchester City Council voted to repeat the event with £250,000 of funding. This result was met with pushback from the Liberal Democrats on the Council. The Liberal Democrat leader on the Council stated, "If they said it was £100,000 and we'd get the money back from people like Tesco and Starbucks and other sponsors, then we'd be happy to go along. But we think the subsidy is too much when they are making cuts to frontline services like gating schemes and playing parks."

Due to the COVID-19 pandemic, there was a two-year period between Manchester Day 2019 and 2022 where no Manchester Day festival was held.

In 2023, the Manchester City Council ended the parade format to change it into an all-day and all-night festival. The Council stated the new format is "better than a parade that's all over in an hour."

== Events ==
In 2011, an estimated 80,000 people attended the Manchester Day Parade. The theme of the parade was 'Voyage of Discovery', with a Lancaster bomber and a giant Gulliver figure being the prime attractions of the parade.

In 2012, Manchester Day was attended by 80,000 people. The event was primarily a parade, which featured a 150-piece band and giant puppets.

In 2017, Manchester Day was attended by 100,000 people and 22,000 people took part in the parade. The parade commemorated the victims of the Manchester Arena bombing.

In 2022, Manchester Day Parade was attended by 20,000 people. The parade's prime attractions were a queen bee and the Little Amal puppet.

In 2024, Manchester Day was attended by 50,000 people and had 300 performers. The city centre was also turned into a sports-themed playground; tennis, rugby, and taekwondo events happened.
