= Sackville Gardens =

Park in Manchester, England

Coordinates: 53°28′36″N 2°14′09″W

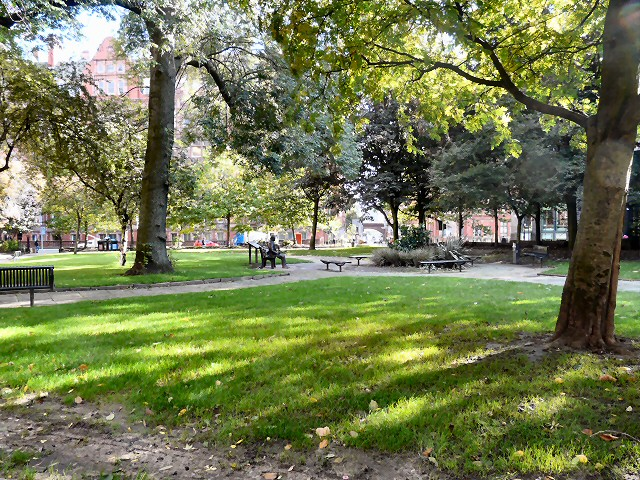
Sackville Gardens

Sackville Gardens is a public space in Manchester, England. It is bounded by Manchester College's Shena Simon Campus on one side and Whitworth Street, Sackville Street, the Rochdale Canal and Canal Street on the others.

The land was purchased by Manchester Corporation in 1900 and laid out with walks, lawns and flower beds. Known as Whitworth Gardens, it was planned to complement the Municipal College of Technology's Sackville Street Building. It is regularly used for events, such as Village People and Manchester Pride, and as the meeting point each morning for Free Manchester Walking Tours.

== Turing memorial ==
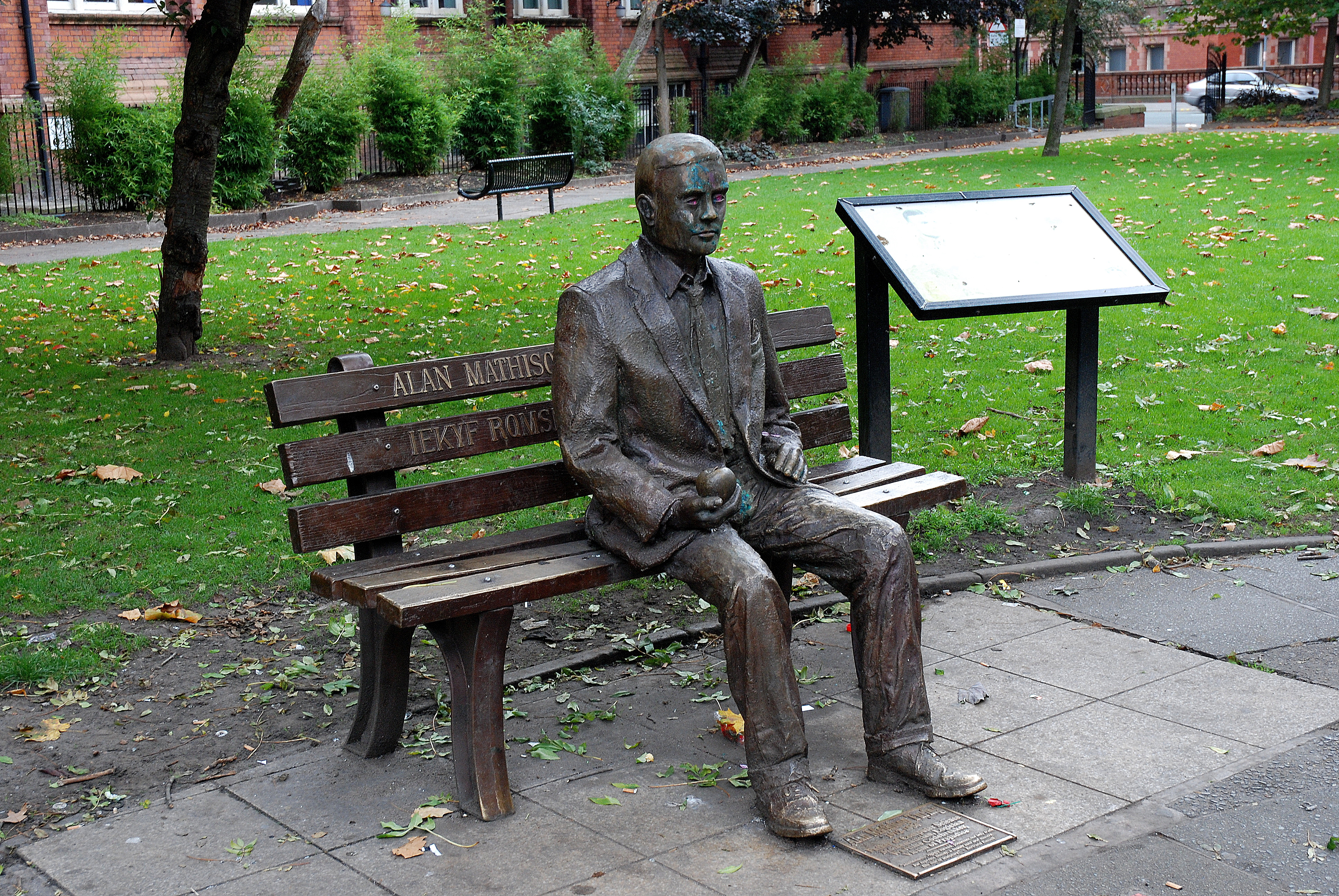
Alan Turing memorial statue

The gardens contain the Alan Turing memorial statue, which depicts the "father of modern computing" sitting on a bench at a central position in the park. Sculptor Glyn Hughes said the park was chosen as the location for the statue because "It's got the university science buildings...on one side and it's got all the gay bars on the other side, where apparently he spent most of his evenings."

The statue was unveiled on 23 June, Turing's birthday, in 2001. It was conceived by Richard Humphry, a barrister from Stockport, after seeing Hugh Whitemore's play Breaking the Code, and he set up the Alan Turing Memorial Fund in order to raise the necessary funds. Glyn Hughes, an industrial sculptor from Adlington near Westhoughton, was commissioned to sculpt the statue. The fund eventually raised around £15,000, which was far short of the £50,000 needed to have the statue cast in Britain, so it was cast in China.

Turing is shown holding an apple, a symbol classically used to represent forbidden love, as well as being the fruit of the tree of knowledge, the object that inspired Isaac Newton's theory of gravitation, and the means of Turing's own death. The text on the bronze bench reads "Alan Mathison Turing 1912–1954" and "IEKYF ROMSI ADXUO KVKZC GUBJ". The latter is described by Glyn Hughes as "a motto as encoded by the German 'Enigma'". The original message is often given as "Founder of Computer Science", however this is unlikely as the Enigma ciphering system does not allow a letter to be enciphered to itself, while the fourteenth letter of that message (the "U" in "Computer") is the same as the fourteenth letter of the encoded inscription.

A plaque at the statue's feet says "Father of Computer Science, Mathematician, Logician, Wartime Codebreaker, Victim of Prejudice", followed by a Bertrand Russell quotation: "Mathematics, rightly viewed, possesses not only truth but supreme beauty, a beauty cold and austere like that of sculpture." The sculptor buried his own old Amstrad computer (a popular early home computer) under the statue, as a tribute to "the godfather of all modern computers".

== Beacon of Hope ==
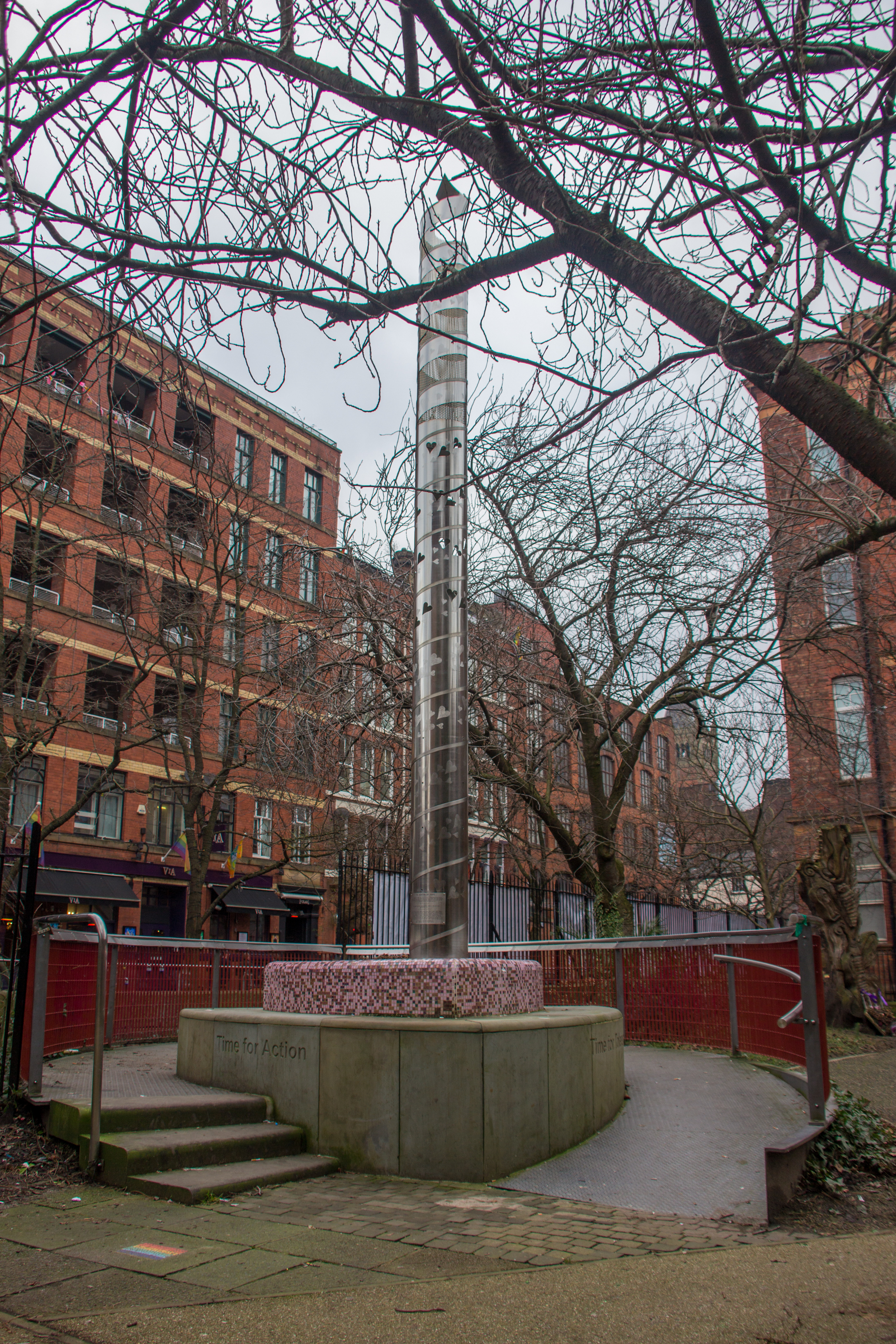
The Beacon of Hope

The gardens also contains the Beacon of Hope, the UK's only permanent memorial for people living with HIV or AIDS and lives lost to it. The sculpture, a decorated steel column designed by Warren Chapman and Jess Boyn-Daniel, was erected in the year 2000.

On World AIDS Day a candlelight vigil generally takes place at the Beacon. For several years the vigil, the traditional closing event of the Manchester Pride LGBT celebration weekend, had been held at the city's Castlefield Arena, but because of the siting of the beacon, it was decided that the vigil should be held in the gardens. Following a highly successful event in 2002, organised by the Village Business Association, George House Trust took control of the vigil for EuroPride in 2003, in collaboration with Manchester City Council and local HIV/AIDS groups such as Body Positive North West, the Lesbian and Gay Foundation and the Black Health Agency. George House Trust no longer runs the vigil annually at Manchester Pride.

During 2021 and 2022, community organisations worked together to refurbish the Beacon of Hope. This work included the repainting of the railings around the Beacon, re-gilding of lettering on the plinth, replacement of missing and broken mosaic tiles and repairs to the internal lighting inside the Beacon itself. The restoration project included George House Trust, Friends of Sackville Gardens, Manchester City Council, LGBT Foundation and Manchester Pride, supported by venues from across the Gay Village. The project has also been supported by Greater Manchester Mayor's LGBTQ+ Advisor, Carl Austin-Behan.

In July, 2022 George House Trust held a re-dedication event of the Beacon of Hope HIV Memorial in Sackville Gardens.

== National Trans Memorial ==
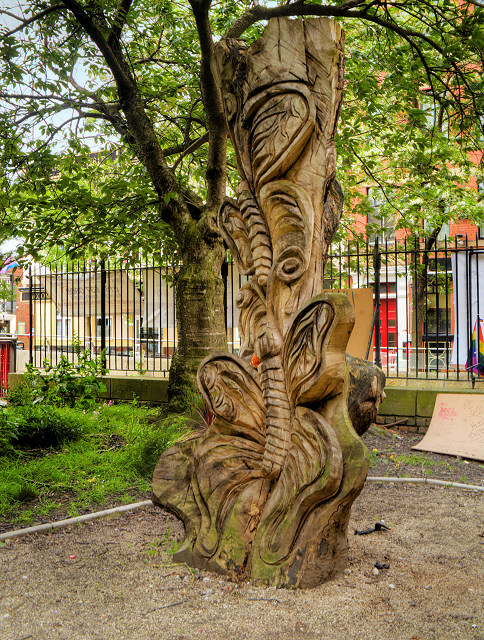
The National Trans Memorial before it burned in 2022

A monument called the National Transgender Memorial was unveiled in July 2013. After being vandalised in August 2013, it was restored in March 2014.

During the night of the 29 August 2022 just after the Manchester Pride, the monument was set on fire and damaged.

Plans for a new monument have been submitted to the city council on 9 April 2024.

== Gallery ==
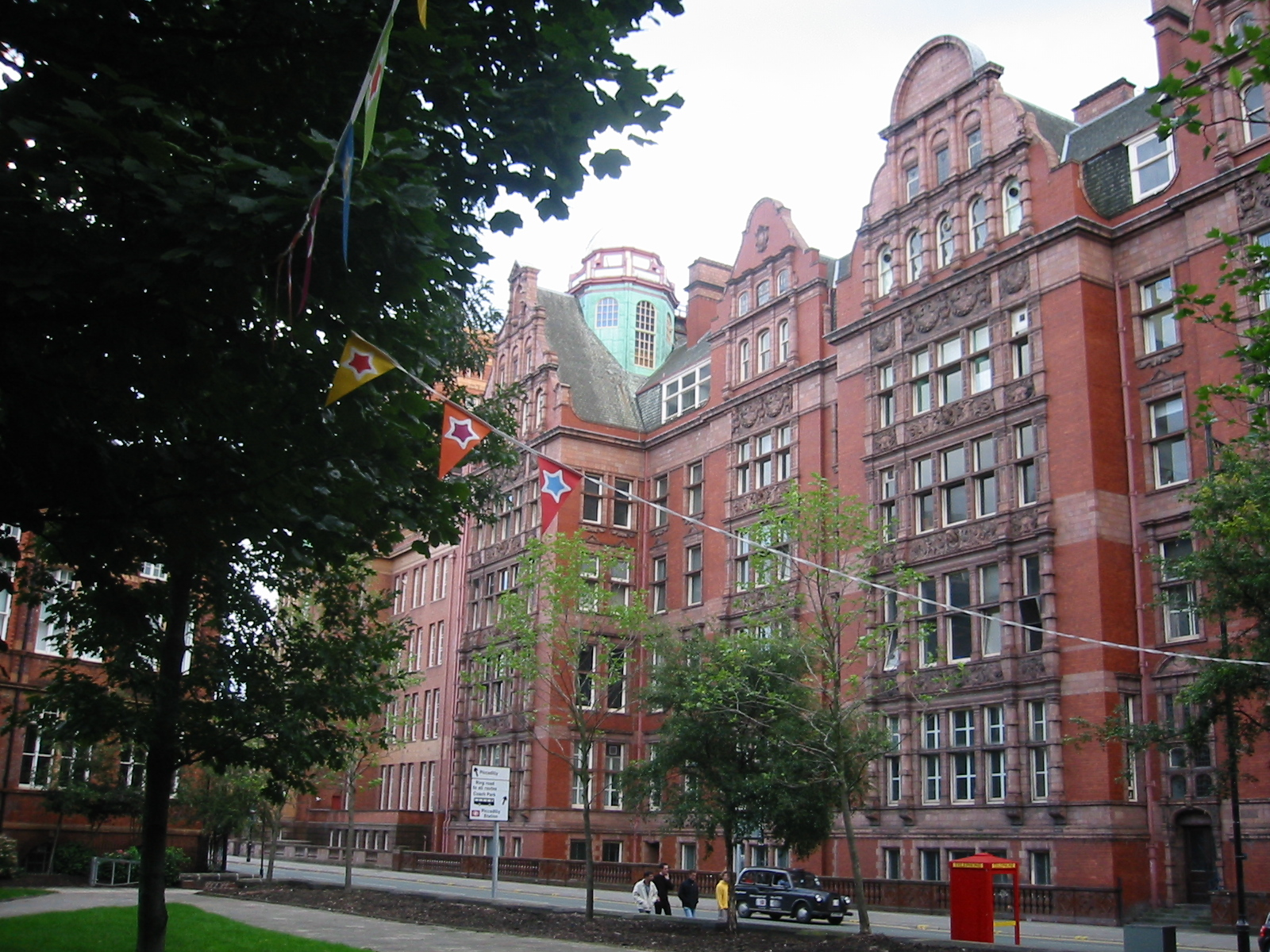
Sackville Gardens looking toward the Sackville Building, University of Manchester

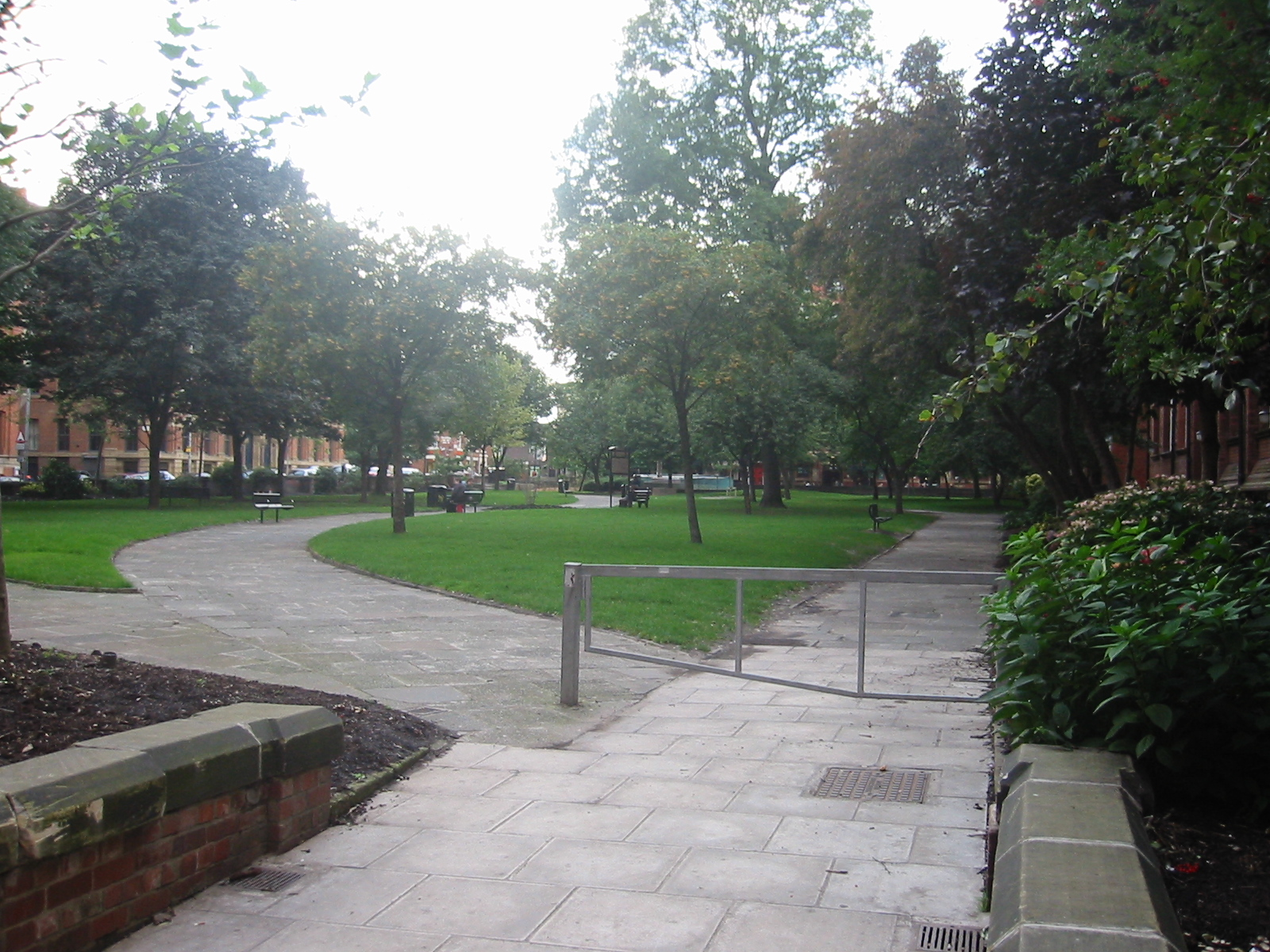
Sackville Gardens seen from the Whitworth Street entrance

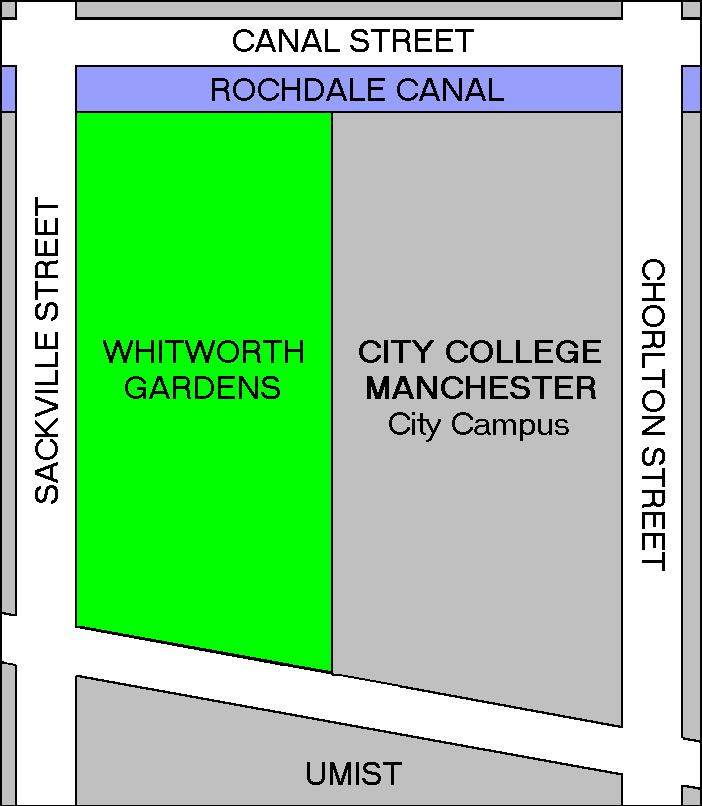
Map showing location of Sackville Gardens
