= LGBT Foundation =

British LGBTQ advocacy group

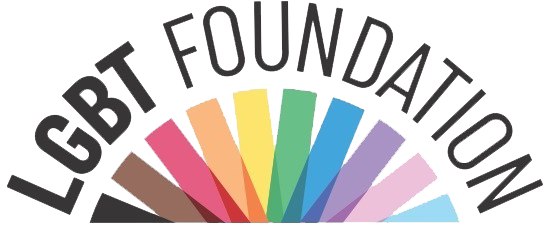
- LGBT Foundation logo
- Formation: January 1975
- Legal status: Charity
- Chief Executive: Paul Martin OBE
- Organisational Values: Passion, Integrity, Empowerment, Respect
- Website: https://lgbt.foundation/

LGBT Foundation, formerly known as The Lesbian & Gay Foundation, is a national charity based in Manchester focused on lesbian, gay, bisexual and trans (LGBTQ) rights and support. Founded in 1975, they support over 40,000 people directly every year, and a further 600,000 online. The charity services including substance misuse, domestic abuse, sexual health testing, talking therapies, wellbeing, community safety, trans advocacy, support for LGBTQ+ armed forces/veterans, and the Indigo Gender Service.

== History ==
The origin of the LGBT Foundation was in the Manchester Lesbian and Gay Switchboard Services (MLGSS), which began on 2 January 1975 when six gay men got together to provide an information and support service for the growing number of gay men coming out following the decriminalisation of homosexuality in 1967. The line ran from 7-9pm each evening. Gradually, services diversified to include counselling, group work and email support.

In April 2000, MLGSS unified with Healthy Gay Manchester (HGM) to form the Lesbian & Gay Foundation (LGF). Drawing upon experience gained from MeSMAC Manchester, HGM was formed in 1994 by Paul Martin OBE, who is the Chief Executive of LGBT Foundation, and Gerard Gudgion with the aim to reduce the incidence of HIV infection through sex between men. It offered free condoms and personal lubricant, counselling, services, groups and volunteering opportunities such as condom packing evenings. In April 2015, the LGF adopted the name LGBT Foundation.

The LGBT Foundation has witnessed and responded to and impacted a number of national and international developments for LGBT equality LGBT Foundation co-operated with Manchester Pride for the organisation of its yearly "Pride" event. It previously provided media partnership to Manchester Pride with its magazine Out North West, until the magazine was discontinued.

== Current work ==
As of 2019, LGBT Foundation is the largest LGBT health and community services charity in the UK, offering a range of services serving over 40,000 people in person and over 600,000 people online every year. LGBT Foundation provides a range of wellbeing and support services. Their domestic abuse programme provides housing advice, casework support and advice sessions to LGBT victims of domestic abuse. Their substance misuse programme provides support for those addicted to drugs and/or alcohol. Their talking therapies team deliver LGBT-affirmative counselling support. Their befriending service helps people to build their support networks, make friends and reduce loneliness.

The Foundation Direct helpline, which is the organisation's oldest service, provides crisis email and phone support to over 5,000 people every year. They operate a sexual health testing service for men who have sex with men and LGBT people, conducting outreach testing across Greater Manchester. Each year their sexual health team distributes over a quarter of a million condoms and sachets of lube, celebrating 30 years of free condom and lube distribution in 2024. Pride in Practice is LGBT Foundation's quality assurance support service that strengthens and develops Primary Care Services relationship with their lesbian, gay, bisexual and trans patients within the local community. As of 2019, 2.1 million patients in Greater Manchester are now registered at Pride in Practice accredited GP practices.

The Village Angels and Village Haven are LGBT Foundation's night-time safety and harm reduction projects. They provide support to vulnerable people in Manchester's historic Gay Village on a Friday and Saturday evening from 9pm to 3am. The Village Angels was first established in 2011, where a team of volunteers and a first-aid trained shift lead patrolling the Gay Village every Friday and Saturday from 9pm to 3am, wearing distinctive hot pink uniforms. In 2016, they piloted an expansion of the Angels programme: the Village Haven, a night-time refuge for vulnerable persons. Following the success of this pilot, the Village Haven became a permanent fixture of LGBT Foundation's community safety programme in 2017 working continually in tandem with the Village Angels.

Each year the programmes support 5,000 people every year, including 450 highly vulnerable people. In 2017, they partnered with Smirnoff as part of their "We're Open" campaign making a short video about the Angels work and to begin expanding the programme nationally. In 2018, the Village Angels and Haven volunteers won the "Dedication to Volunteering" award at the Greater Manchester Health and Care Champions Awards, an initiative of the Greater Manchester Combined Authority and the NHS. In 2019, the Village Angels were awarded the Queen's Award for Voluntary Service, the highest honour a voluntary group can receive in the UK.

Recently, LGBT Foundation has expanded its operations to Liverpool, Coventry and Greater London. The Soho Angels, a night-time harm reduction programme based upon the Village Angels, was established in Soho in 2018 in collaboration with Westminster City Council and Smirnoff. The Government Equalities Office to had commissioned the LGBT Foundation to roll out Pride in Practice through five London clinical commissioning groups (CCGs) — Lewisham, Southwark, Lambeth, Wandsworth CCG and North West London. Nationally, Eastern Cheshire, Mid Essex, St Helens, Greater Huddersfield, Calderdale and North Kirklees CCGs have also expressed interest in running the programme in future.
