= Canal Street, Manchester =

Street in Manchester, England

Canal Street
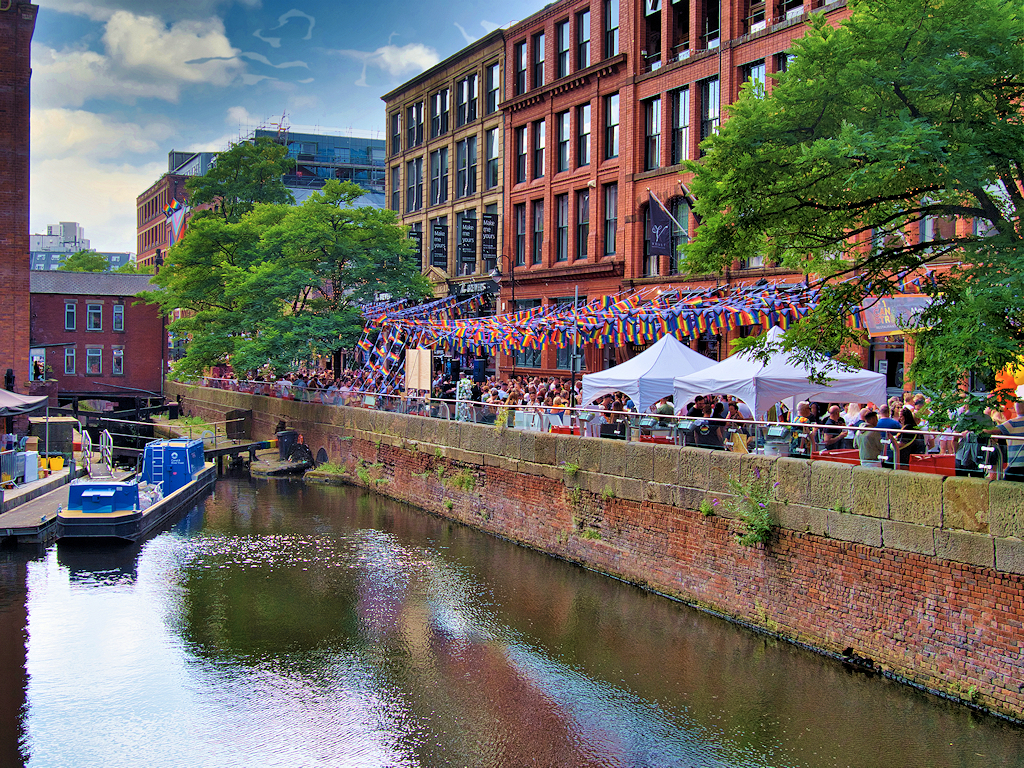
- A view of the street
- Interactive map of Canal Street
- Location: Manchester city centre, England
- Postal code: M1
- Coordinates: 53°28′40″N 2°14′08.25″W

Construction
- Construction start: 1804

Other
- Known for: Gay village, gay clubs and bars
- Website: www.canal-st.co.uk

Canal Street is a street in Manchester city centre in North West England and the centre of Manchester's gay village. The pedestrianised street, which runs along the west side of the Rochdale Canal, is lined with gay bars and restaurants. The northern end of the street meets Minshull Street and the southern meets Princess Street; part of the street looks across the Rochdale Canal into Sackville Gardens.

== History ==
Canal Street developed when the Rochdale Canal was constructed in 1804, a trade artery running through the city. Pubs and other businesses evolved to service the users of the canal, especially the people stopping at the lock nearby.

It wasn't until the 20th century when the area first begin to be properly associated with gay people. By the 1950s, use of the canal had greatly declined due to competition from other methods of transport. Whilst assuming the form of an industrial area full of cotton factories, by night the area was a red-light district. With the collapse of the cotton industry in Northern England, the area suffered urban decay. The area along the canal was perfect for gay men to meet clandestinely as it was dark and unvisited, but was near to good transport links such as Oxford Road and Piccadilly railway stations.

In the 1980s, James Anderton, Chief Constable of Greater Manchester, accused gays of "swirling in a cesspit of their own making" and, according to Beatrix Campbell, "encouraged his officers to stalk its dank alleys and expose anyone caught in a clinch, while police motorboats with spotlights cruised for gay men around the canal's locks and bridges". Anderton, when questioned about the policing of the Canal Street area, denied that he was motivated by anti-gay prejudice and was merely enforcing the law on sexual activity in public toilets. Greater Manchester Police under his leadership ran a strict licensing regime for bars and nightclubs in the central Manchester area. Anderton retired in 1991.

The opening of Manto (a gay bar) in 1990 was regarded as a catalyst for the development of many of the current style of bars and clubs in the Village. It was created when Carol Ainscow, a gay property developer, alongside her business partner Peter Dalton, bought a garage repair building on Canal Street. Unlike the other gay bars at that time, the building was the first in the area to be clad with large plate glass windows; allowing the casual passer-by to view what was going on inside. Previously, many establishments catering for the gay community were often keen to conceal activities from the general public, but the architectural design of Manto was seen as a queer visual statement of "we're here, we're queer – get used to it", and a brick-and-mortar refusal to hide any more, or to remain underground and invisible. Ainscow stated, "I felt sick of having to knock on doors and hide". Despite this, she stated that for the first six months of business, Manto was continually losing money due to people's fear of being seen in there.

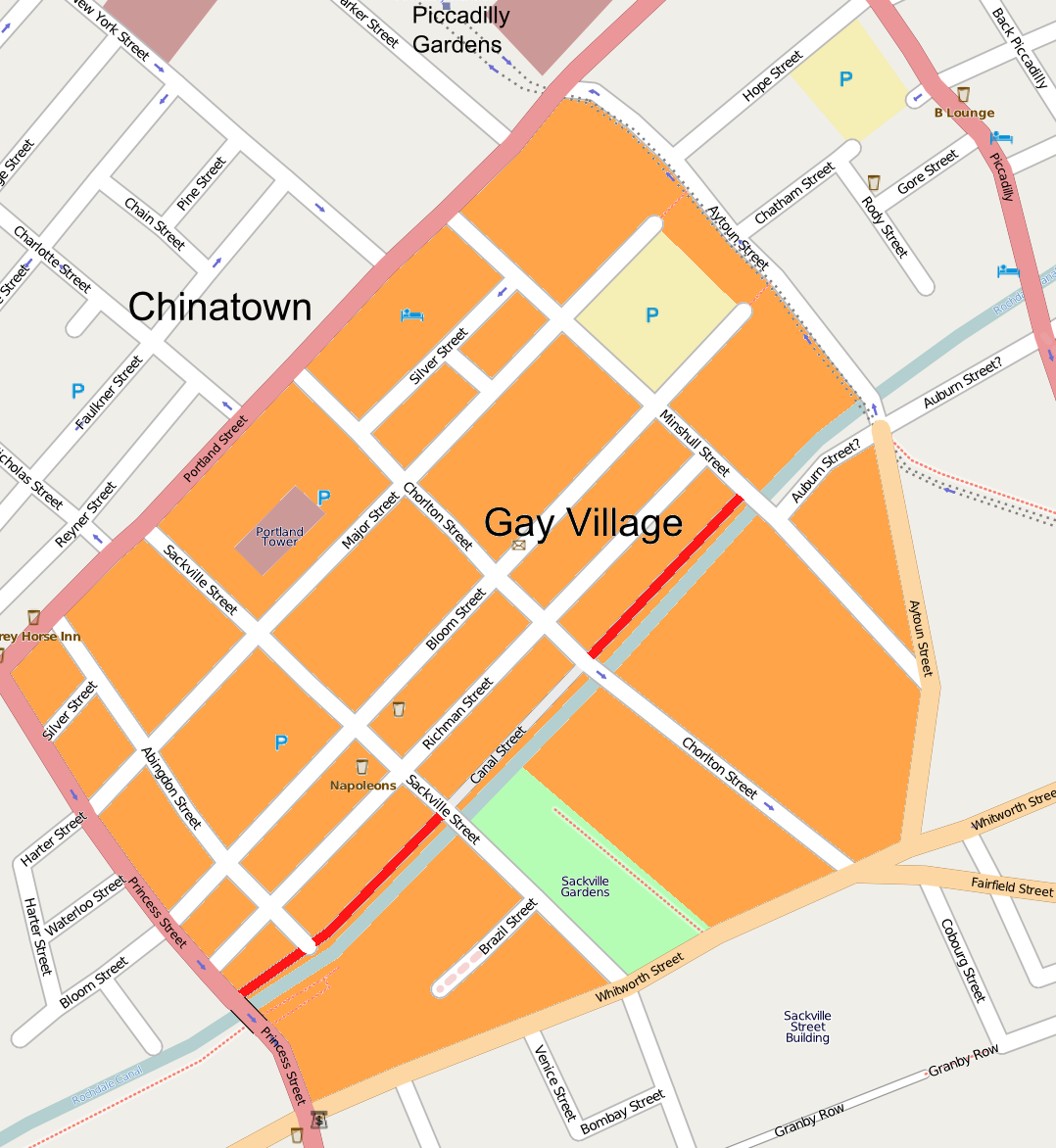
Gay Village around Canal Street

Another catalyst for the expansion in the 1990s was its official recognition by Manchester City Council. Following the passing of a number of non-discrimination policies on the grounds of sexuality in the late 1980s, the council was pioneering work in the advancement of lesbian and gay rights with an HIV/AIDS unit, sympathetic press and marketing officers like Chris Payne and Tony Cross, an Equality Group which appointed lesbians and gay men as officers - including Paul Fairweather, Marcus Woolley, Chris Root, Maggie Turner, Terry Waller and Mark Ovenden - to key departments like Libraries, Children's Services and Housing and much official emphasis was placed on strengthening the community element of the Village. This included major support for the Mardi Gras, purchase of the Sackville Street Gardens in 1990, and becoming the first UK council to support civil partnerships.

The Village has been unified by issues regarding the gay community, such as Section 28 in the run-up to it becoming law in 1988 and the period thereafter. Ian Wilmott, a gay Labour councillor, said, "Section 28 was such a monstrous attack on civil liberties that hundreds of campaigners came together to oppose it. People were feeling besieged. We had no homeland, no part of the city. We needed somewhere ... It had to be more than a club. We willed the village into existence." Additionally, raising awareness over the HIV/AIDS threat to the community was "integral to bringing the village together" according to John Hamilton, chair of the Village Business Association. This focus led to several of the pubs on or near Canal Street acquiring a predominantly gay clientele.

Over the next decade, more numerous and larger bars opened along the canal side, turning Canal Street into the centre of the most successful gay village in Europe, including Via Fossa, Velvet, Eden and AXM.

In 1999, Canal Street was bought to wider public view through its setting for the television series Queer as Folk, and again in the 2001 series Bob & Rose. More recently, Canal Street has featured in the 2026 series Tip Toe.

== Mainstream popularity ==
This success led to a number of problems, however, with a resultant influx of straight drinkers including hen parties into the village and tensions amongst the existing LGBT community. Increasingly strict and cautious door policies on some bars attempted to keep some straight people out with questioning on the door to test for "gayness" however this also caused unintended consequences with some LGBT people being turned away. As the popularity of the village grew, so did problems of incoming crime.

In 2004 a boycott was launched against a new Slug and Lettuce bar by the village community because the chain refused to support Manchester Pride, eventually leading to its closure.

By 2006, concerns were being raised about falling revenues in the bars on Canal Street. In a 2013 article in Mancunian Matters, a community based web newspaper and webzine, Amy Lofthouse explored the change within Canal Street: "For more than 20 years Canal Street has been viewed as the centre of the gay community in Manchester… but campaigners want to ensure dangerous stereotypes of it being a 'gay ghetto' are left behind. With clubs, pubs and restaurants, the village has also become the focus of many a night out for students, hen parties and friends on a weekend away. This change however has not been welcomed by everyone on the street. Earlier in the year there was controversy over club door policies and there were fears that Canal Street’s role in the LGBT community was being diluted. Nowhere was the change in the Street shown more starkly than with the closure of Manto in October 2013. Manto was one of the most iconic bars in the area, having been a fixture on the street for 22 years. Manto's re-opened in 2015 under a new name of ON Bar initially struggling it found its feet again in 2016 when the London owners head hunted Tony D Cooper from the successful Via further up Canal St." Lofthouse quotes Amelia Lee of LGBT Youth North West as feeling that Canal Street is over-emphasised as an all-encompassing gay area: "It’s more for hen-do events than for LGBT people. I think it has grown too big and now needs to readjust and diversify to cater for more needs of the LGBT community."

This change in the types of clientele attending or moving in and out of the area in recent years is believed to have led to a number of homophobic attacks such as the one on Simon Brass, who was thrown into the canal and left to drown by a gang of muggers in June 2013.

In February 2015, gay activist Peter Tatchell added his voice to the debate about the changing nature of the area in the Manchester Evening News, saying "It would be very wrong if there were unilateral attempts to change its character. I am all in favour of it evolving but it has to be with the agreement of the LGBTI community. As a society the need for specific gay districts may decline but we are not there yet. It would be a backward step to de-gay Canal Street."

== Redevelopment ==
Further concerns for the future of the gay village have come about from redevelopment in and around the area. 800 "upmarket" homes are planned to be built overlooking Canal Street, and the existing community including bar owners running late licences fear that "there will be untenable conflict of interest between future residents and longstanding LGBT establishments". There has been criticism of a "lack of consultation", and tensions exacerbated by early developer plans referring to the area as "Portland Village" instead. Others believe that the area has lost its former attraction and finds itself "at a crossroads".

Following a strategic review of the area in 2020, Manchester City Council, in partnership with Consultancy HATCH, launched the Manchester's Gay Village Action Plan in 2024, which aims to 'maintain, preserve and improve the LGBT quarter' based on consultation, feedback and further planned collaboration with the LGBT+ community.

== Image gallery ==
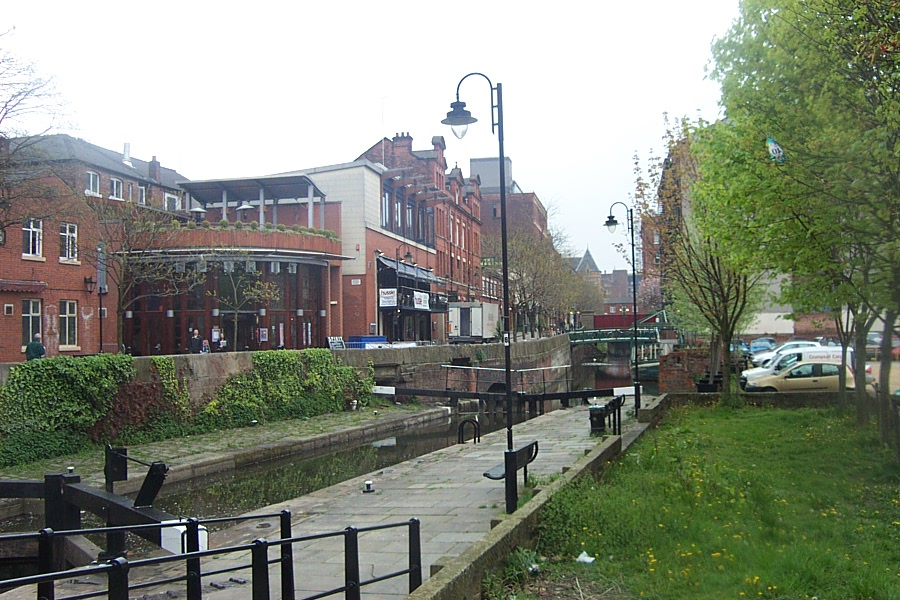
Gay Village and the canal locks

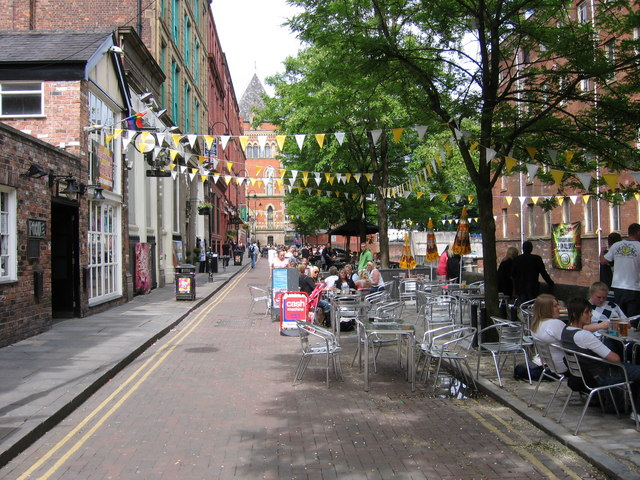
Canal Street bars

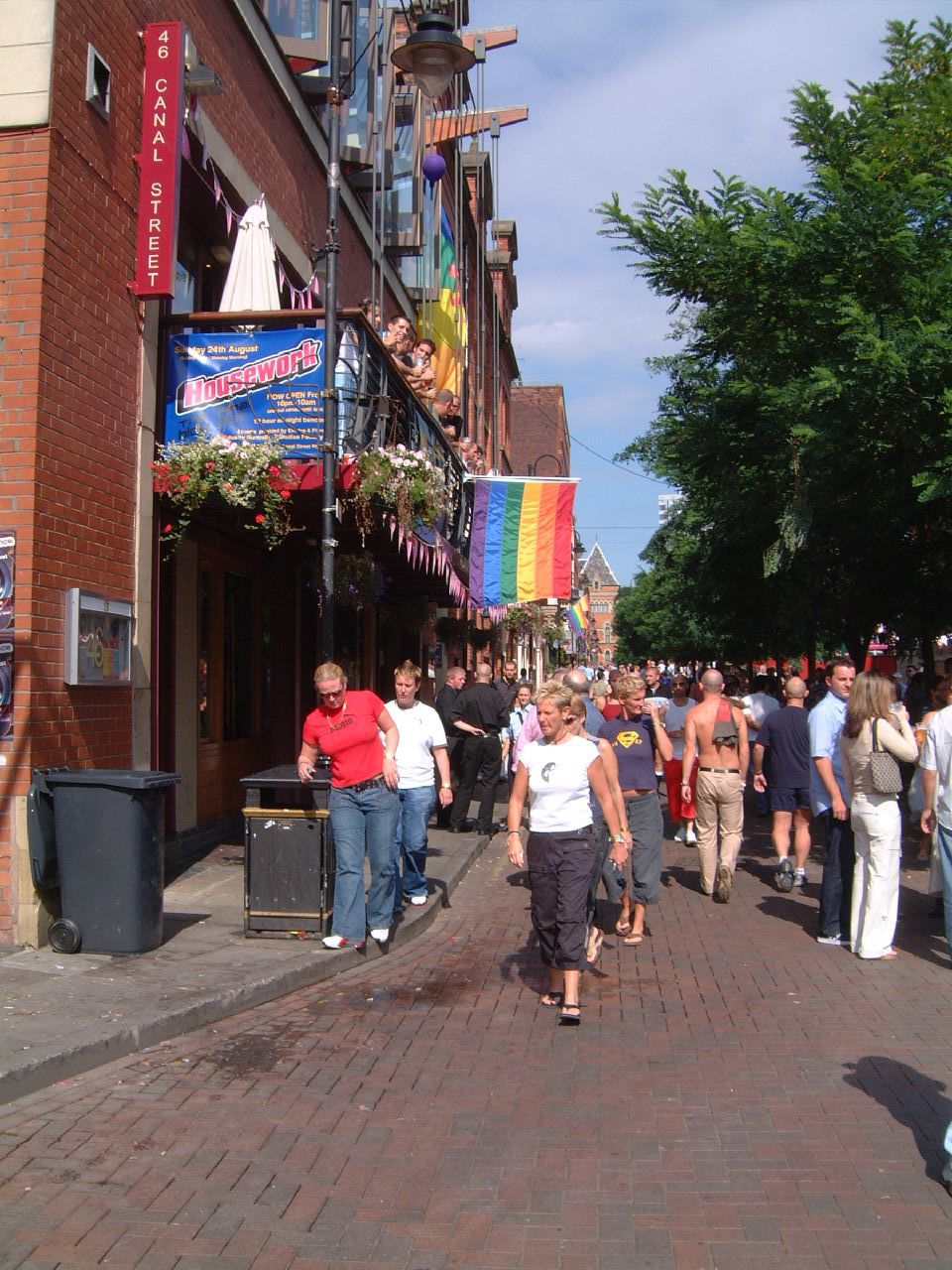
Canal Street during the annual Gay Pride event

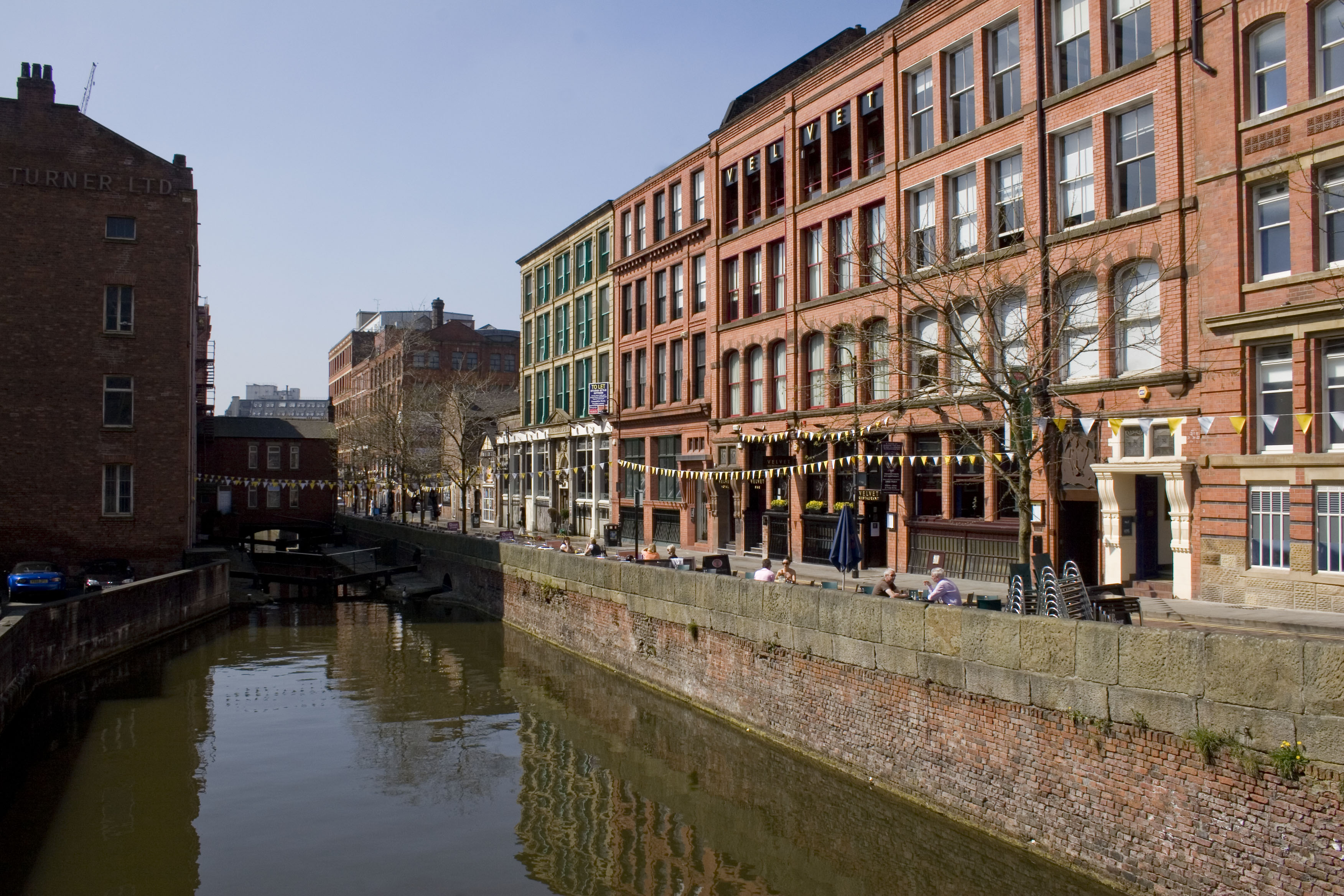
Canal Street

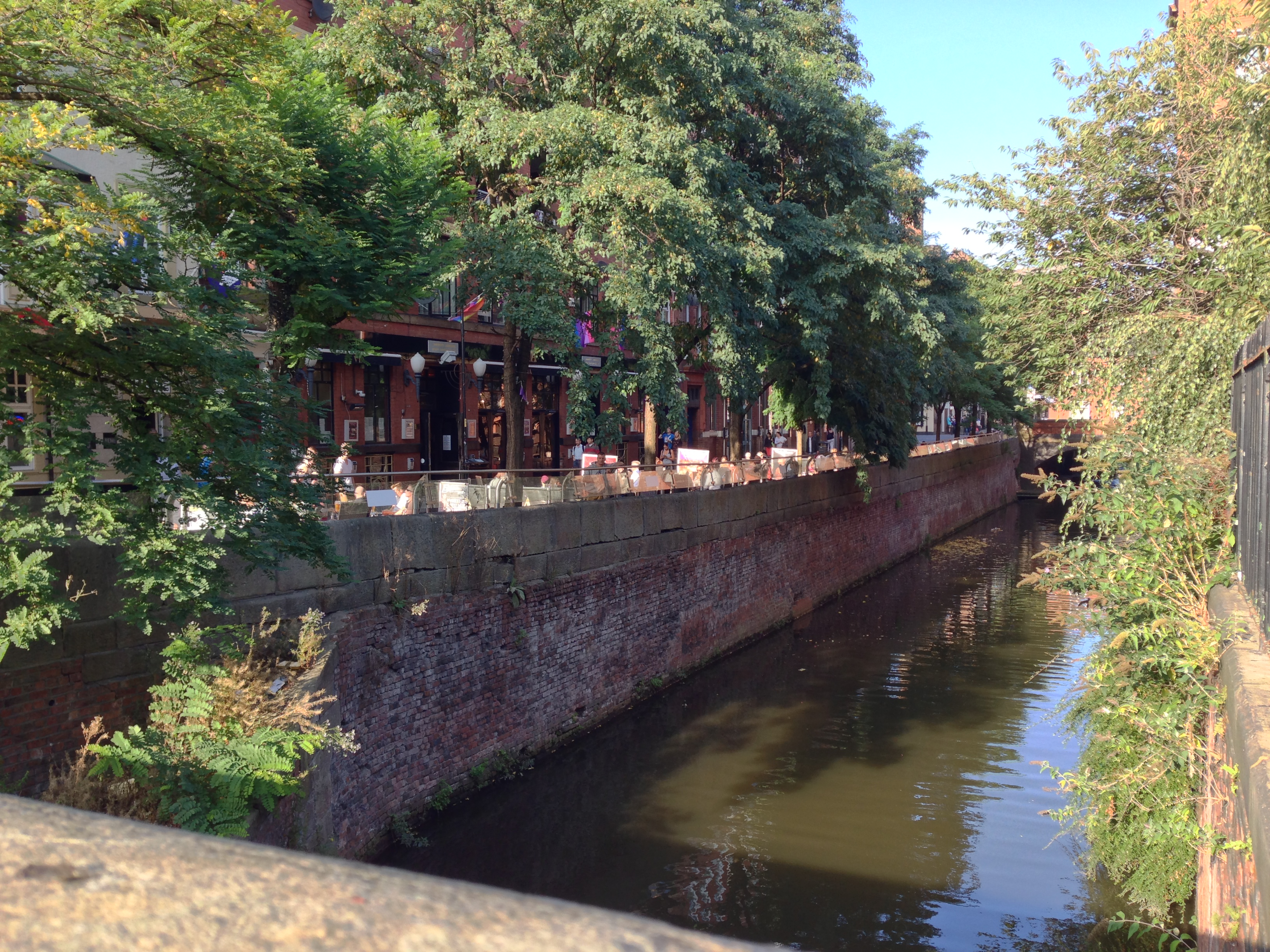
Canal Street

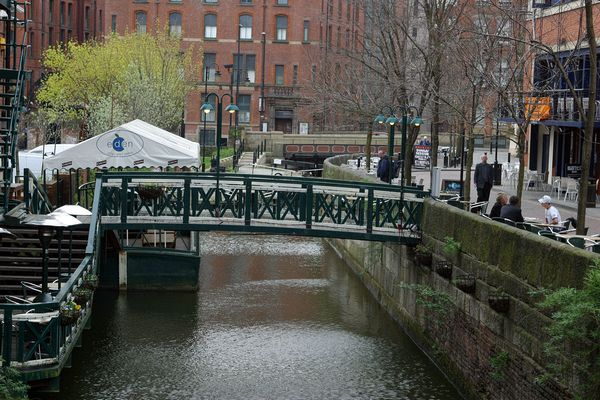
Canal Street

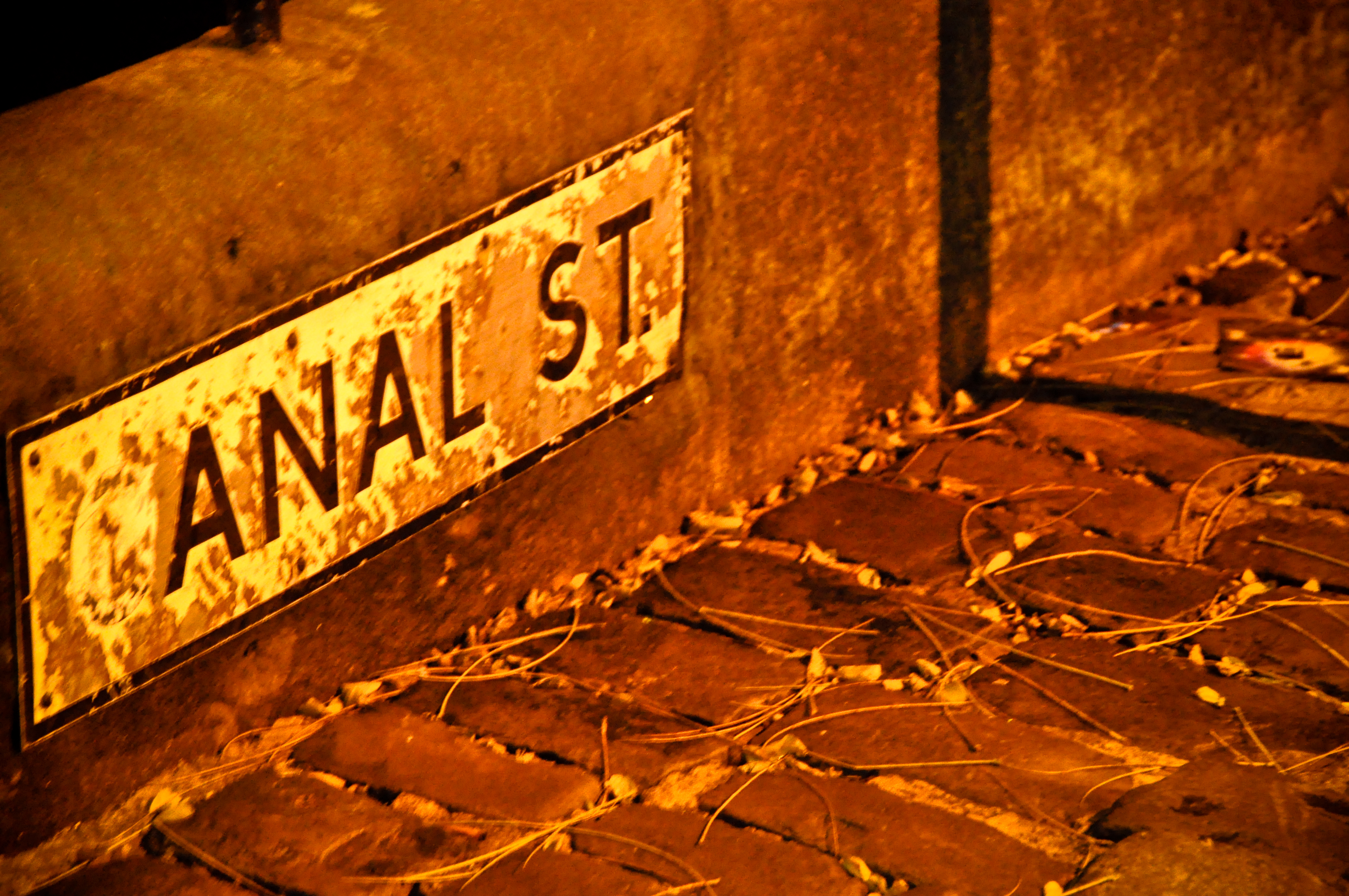
Defaced Canal Street sign
