= Shonan Fujisawa Campus, Keio University =

Coordinates: 35°23′18″N 139°25′42″E

- 慶應義塾大学湘南藤沢キャンパス; Keio Gijuku Daigaku Shonan-Fujisawa kanpasu
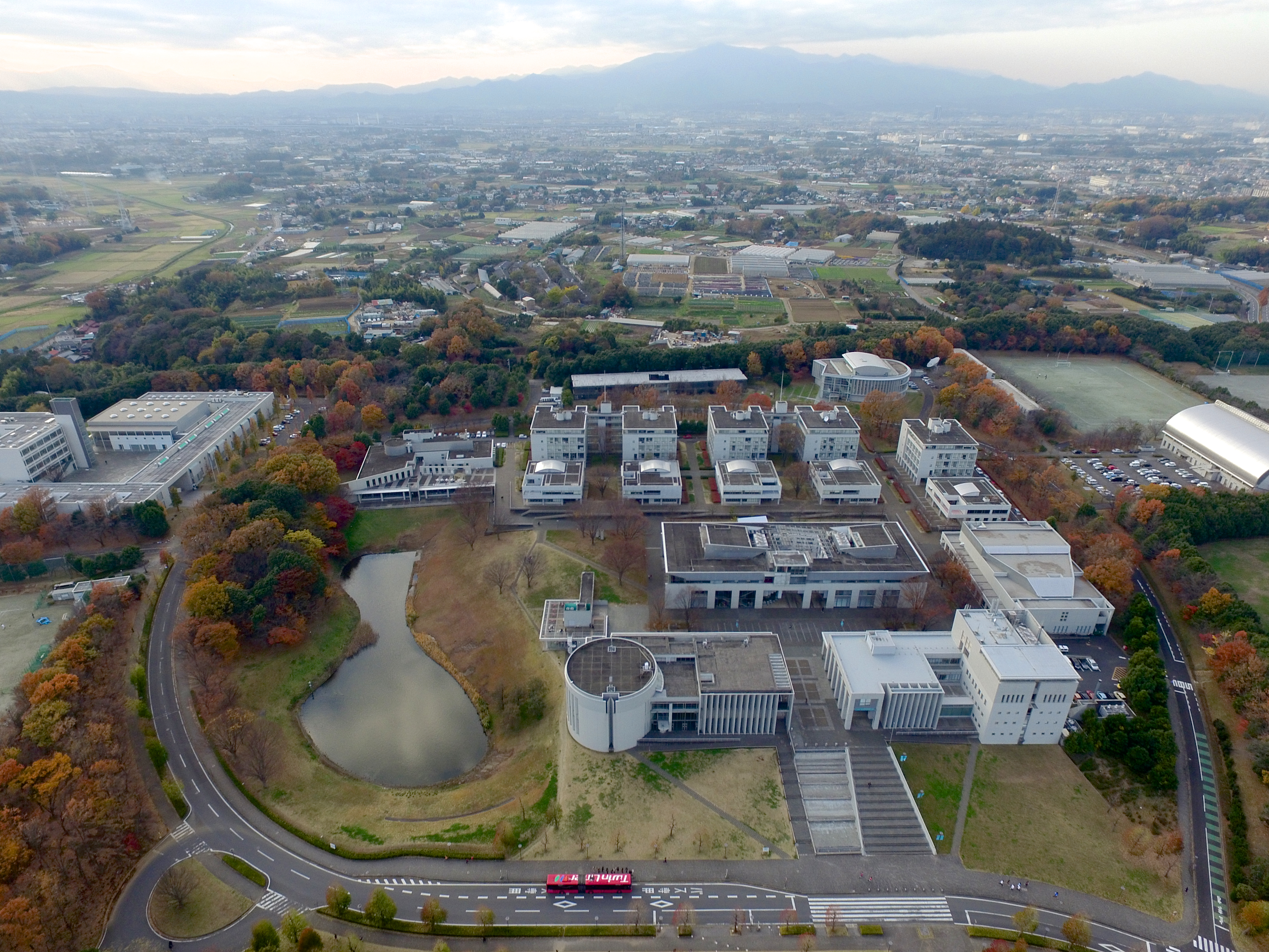
- Type: Private
- Established: 1990
- Location: Fujisawa, Kanagawa, Japan
- Website: sfc.keio.ac.jp

Shonan Fujisawa Campus, Keio University (慶應義塾大学湘南藤沢キャンパス, Keio Gijuku Daigaku Shonan-Fujisawa kanpasu; abbreviated as SFC) is a research-oriented campus of Keio University located in the city of Fujisawa, Kanagawa Prefecture, Japan. The campus currently offers three undergraduate courses and two postgraduate courses, and incorporates one high school and several research institutes. The campus was designed by Fumihiko Maki, a Pritzker Prize laureate.

== History ==
Keio Gijuku (public school) was founded by Fukuzawa Yukichi in 1858 in downtown Tokyo. The subsidiary Keio University Shonan Fujisawa Campus opened in 1990, starting with the Faculty of Policy Management (the first dean was Hiroshi Katou) and Faculty of Environmental Information (The first dean was Hideo Aiso). This was expanded in 1991 with the establishment of three Research Institutes (Policy Management, Environmental Information, and Language Communication).

In addition to the university, the Shonan Fujisawa Junior and Senior High Schools were added in 1992, and a graduate school for Media and Governance in 1994. The Keio Research Institute was opened in 1996. In 2001, the school added a Faculty of Nursing and Medical Care, followed by a teacher training course in 2002. A graduate school of Health Management was started in 2005.

== Schools ==
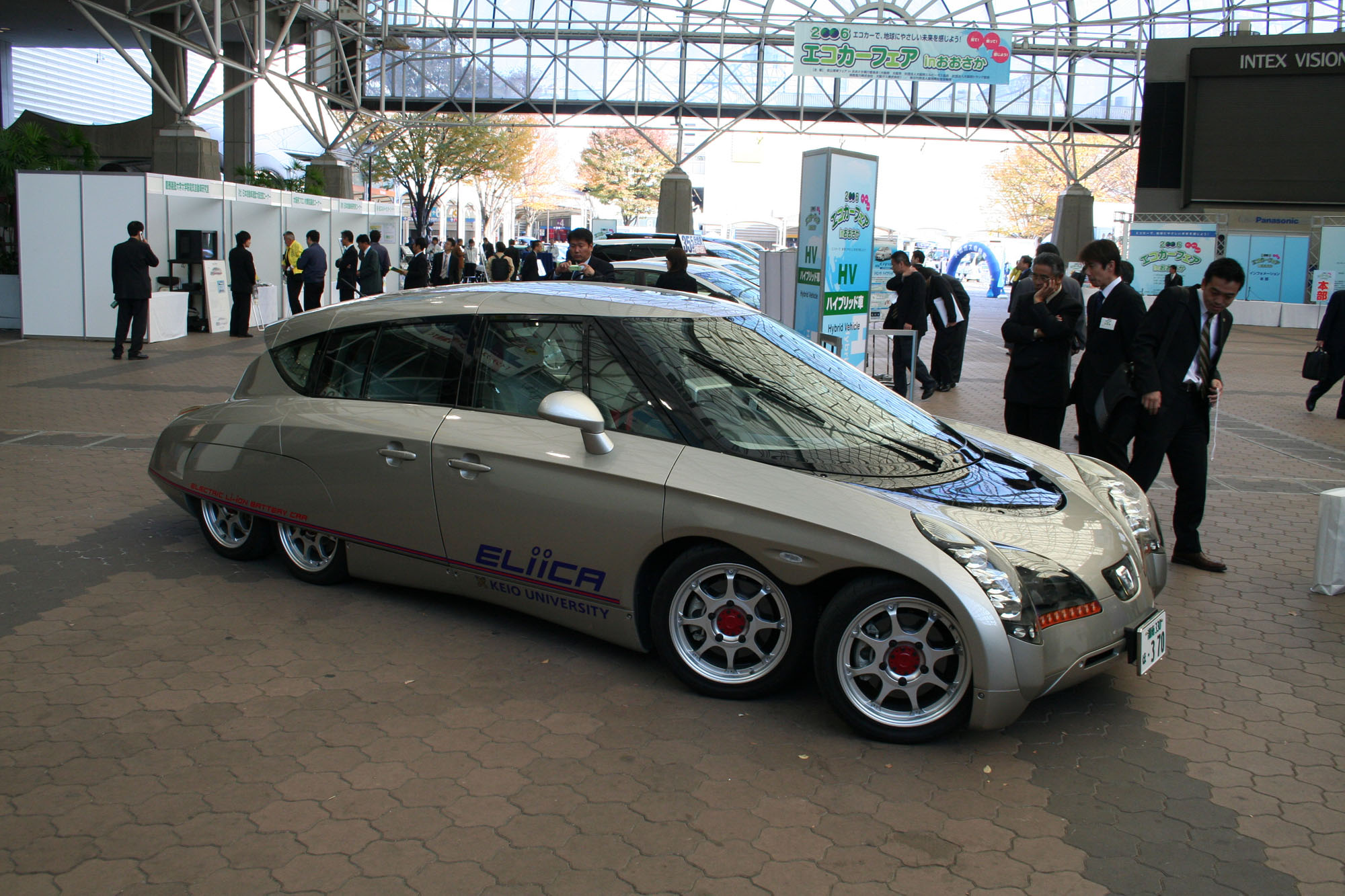
Eliica project is led by Hiroshi Shimizu, professor of SFC

- Faculty of Policy Management
- Faculty of Environment and Information Studies
- Faculty of Nursing and Medical Care
- Graduate School of Media and Governance
- Graduate School of Health Management
- Keio Shonan-Fujisawa Junior & Senior High School

== Research institutes ==
- The Keio Research Institute at SFC (KRIS)

== Other Facilities ==
- Keio Fujisawa Innovation Village SFC-IV

== People ==
Faculty

- Jun Murai: founder of JUNET and president of WIDE Project
- Heizo Takenaka: economist, former politician (member of Koizumi Cabinet)
- Fumihiko Maki: Pritzker Prize Laureate
- Shirō Asano : former governor of Miyagi Prefecture
- Hiroshi Shimizu: project leader of Eliica
- Takeshi Natsuno: creator of i-mode
- Shunji Yamanaka: designer of Nissan Infiniti Q45, Suica
- Naoki Sakai: designer of Nissan Be-1
- Naoyuki Agawa: a Japanese lawyer, diplomat, academic and author
- Jimbo Ken

Alumni

- Yukari Yoshihara: Go professional
- Gaku Hashimoto: Japanese politician
- Kreva (rapper)
- Asami Konno: member of JPop group Morning Musume
- Yo Hitoto: JPop singer, songwriter
- Hiro Mizushima: actor, model
- Masahiro Yanagida: athlete, Japan men's national volleyball team #8

== Location ==
The nearest train station is Shonandai Station, which is about 45 minutes away from Shinjuku. Almost all of the students take a bus from the station, as the campus is approximately 3 kilometers away.

== See also ==
- Keio University
