= Internet in Japan =

Internet in Japan provides high quality services to more than 90% of the population and almost 100% of medium to large businesses, with mobile Internet on devices like smartphones being the most popular type of service. The Ministry of Internal Affairs and Communications (MIC) oversees the telecommunications, Internet, and broadcast sectors, but regulation of Japan's Internet industry is largely through voluntary self-regulation. There is little or no explicit censorship or restriction of Internet content, with the government respecting laws for freedom of speech and of the press, but there are concerns that the government indirectly encourages self-censorship practices. The Internet in Japan is not a singular medium and affects Japanese culture in a variety of ways as diverse groups of Japanese people interact online.

== Statistics ==
- Internet users: 116.8 million users, 91.3% of the population, 7th in the world (January 2020).
- Household penetration: 92% (2019).
- Business penetration: 99.6% (2019).
- Fixed Broadband: 32.2% (2019).
- Mobile Broadband: 133.2%, 8th in the world (2017).
- Internet hosts: 78.2 million, 2nd in the world (2017).
- Mobile social media penetration: 65% (January 2020).

== Regulation ==
Self-regulation plays an important role among Japanese Internet service providers (ISPs), as Japan lacks an independent regulatory commission. The Ministry of Internal Affairs and Communications (MIC) oversees the telecommunications, Internet, and broadcast sectors with a hands-off approach. Law enforcement is more proactive in regulation of the internet and has made arrests with mixed results on the basis of online activity. Non-profit organizations such as the Broadcasting Ethics & Program Improvement Organization have been formed to help regulate the Internet.

Japan has three major mobile operators—au by KDDI, NTT's DoCoMo, and Softbank. NTT, while considered a privatized and reorganized ex-state monopoly, remains dominant in practice due to the expense of switching providers, the inconvenience of changing contact information, and other causes tying customers to dominant operators. While the market is open, the NTT group remains dominant and the Japanese government is still the mandated largest shareholder of NTT. The government owns a third of the company, enough to control the vote at shareholder meetings. The government has not exercised this power to manage the company and may have little incentive to challenge NTT's market dominance and push for more competition because of the returns it gets from being a shareholder. No major foreign firms have successfully entered the market, with the exception of smartphones by Apple and Samsung.

== History ==
In September 1984, Jun Murai connected Keio University and Tokyo Institute of Technology with a 300 bit/s line using a telephone line instead of the physical delivery of tape media. In October of the same year, the University of Tokyo was connected and expanded to JUNET, which became the basis of the internet in Japan.

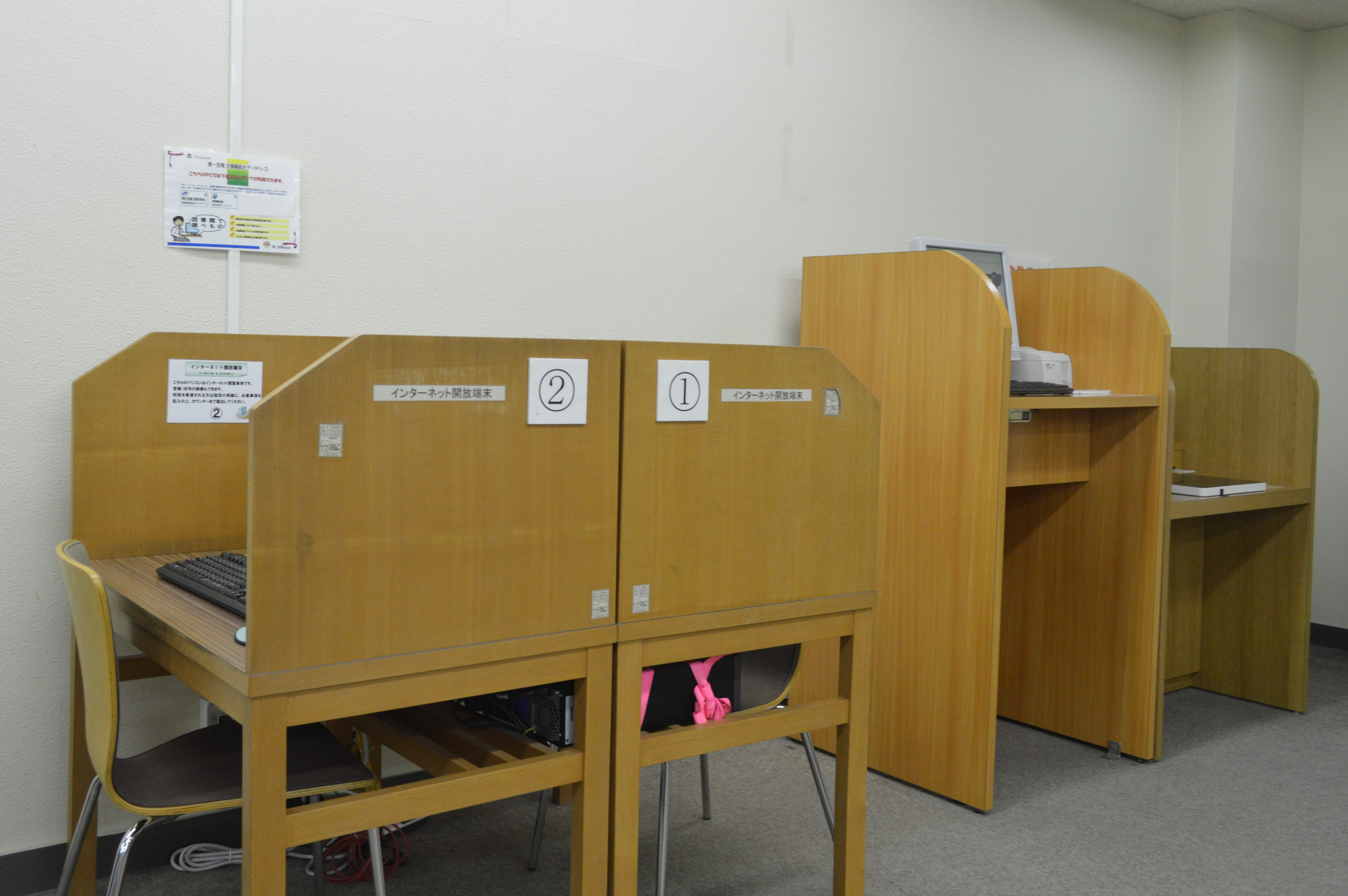
Public library (2017, Aichi)

In Japan, Nippon Telegraph and Telephone (NTT) planned a step-up process from dialup 56 kbit/s ISDN 64 kbit/s, to fiber to the premises (FTTP). Under this plan, NTT had been selling ISDN products primarily toward home users while corporate customers sometimes skipped ISDN entirely and immediately upgraded to the still-expensive fiber to the home (FTTH) service. In the late 1990s, cable television operators began offering their own cable broadband products, but relatively high initial installation costs and cheaper alternatives limited its spread.

In 1999, NTT DoCoMo pioneered the world's first large-scale mobile Internet service, iMode. It was at this time that the Japanese public began to take interest in the Internet. Notably, this means that the Japanese public started with mobile Internet services rather than Internet through personal computers. It is argued that the complexity of the Japanese scripts largely contributes to the lesser popularity of PC Internet. Today, typing in Japanese often involves typing a series of characters and converting them into Kanji (Chinese characters), which can be a slow process. Therefore, typing on a computer would not result in a significant speed advantage over mobile devices, taking away an important feature of computers. Those against this view claim that it is complicated by the popularity of word processors in Japan, which would have the same issue as computer keyboards. By 1993, 37.8% of Japanese households owned stand-alone word processors, while only 11.9% of households owned personal computers. Alternatively, it is suggested that Internet through personal computers is less popular due to the presence of substitutes for popular computer functions: word processors for documentation, cell phones with iMode mobile Internet for communication, game consoles for entertainment.

Asymmetric digital subscriber line (ADSL) services were started by a venture company, Tokyo Metallic in 1999. After this NTT started and some other companies followed. In 2001, SoftBank started a 12 Mbit/s ADSL service. It was a shocking event because the price was around only 3,000¥ (30US$), which was half the cost of other companies. This, coupled with aggressive marketing campaigns led to their capturing of large shares of the market. Competitors and Softbank each dropped prices in a price war and repeatedly readied higher-speed services to entice customers (12 Mbit/s/s 24 Mbit/s/s, 50 Mbit/s). In 2004, Japan had the best cost to performance ADSL service in the world (50 Mbit/s, 35US$) which it held on to in the successive years.

At the same time, NTT and electric power companies expanded FTTP areas. In most urban areas, people can use FTTP (100 Mbit/s, 50US$), but ADSL is still mainstream. However, large discounts and free installation have boosted FTTP adoption. Many new apartments are built to accommodate this service with little or no wiring. In 2005, Kansai Electric Power launched a 1 Gbit/s FTTH service at 8700yen (90US$).

In 2000, the Japanese government ordered Nippon Telegraph and Telephone to unbundle its local loop, which encouraged the emergence of several competing service providers. In the fiscal year of 2004, partial unbundling rates were 120¥ per month and 1,300¥ per month for total unbundling. The price was fixed considering the line costs were covered by voice telephony. Alternative operators could only support incremental costs linked with newly offered functions.

In 2000, rules for operators co-location inside NTT facilities and line delivery terms were established. In 2001, NTT were required to unbundle their interconnection optical fiber links between exchange points. Finally, it was forbidden for NTT East and NTT West to offer Internet access services.

Softbank, a major Japanese ISP, launched a digital subscriber line (DSL) service in 2001 by "Yahoo! Broadband." Massively investing in DSL technology, Softbank became the largest DSL operator by 2003 — larger than even NTT.

In 2004, 52.1% of households had Internet access, with more than half of these households using broadband.

In March 2005, DSL had more than 13.6 million customers. The concurrence of FTTH was increasingly stronger, with the arrival of operators like the Tokyo Electric Power Company (TEPCO), allied to KDDI and NTT. Three million customers were wired with FTTP in March 2005 and according to Yano Research it was on track to supplant DSL by 2007.

The Japanese model of optical fiber deployment is difficult to compare to other markets. The last kilometer is often done on lattice towers, shared between operators, even cable operators. This distribution technique reduces the vulnerability to earthquakes and lowers costs dramatically.

The prevalence of FTTH can be explained by the Japanese government's forced local loop unbundling of NTT and very low charges to connect for new ISPs, leading to new ISPs connecting DSL with low cost and being able to charge cheaper prices due to having a smaller scale operation to challenge the incumbent NTT into using its greater finances to lay fiber to the home to distinguish itself from the competition with higher speeds and also incentivizing some other ISPs to explore fiber to the home, although it remained the dominant fiber provider.

The unique problem facing Japan's broadband situation is due to the popularity of high-speed FTTP. Operators struggle to maintain enough bandwidth to allow maximum usage of the service by customers. Even the largest operators have capacities in the region of tens of gigabits while customers with 1 gigabit FTTP services (or higher) may number in the thousands. This problem is further compounded by limits caused by internal router bandwidth. Estimates of traffic based on data collected in May 2007 by the Ministry of Internal Affairs and Communications set total network usage at approximately 720 Gbit/s combined. The report further states that by May 2008, total traffic will exceed 1 Tbit/s.

In April 2018, Nippon Telegraph and Telephone Corp (the major provider) said it will block access in Japan to three websites where manga and animations are illegally uploaded as an emergency measure until a bill on manga and anime content protection is put in place.

== Internet censorship and surveillance ==
According to the United States Department of State, Japanese law provides for freedom of speech and of the press, and the government respects these rights in practice. These freedoms extend to speech and expression on the Internet. An independent press, an effective judiciary and a functioning democratic political system combine to ensure these rights. The government does not restrict or disrupt access to the Internet or censor online content, and there were no credible reports that the government monitors private online communications without appropriate legal authority. The Internet is widely accessible and used. While there is little or no overt censorship or restriction of content, there are concerns that the government indirectly encourages self-censorship practices. A Reporters Without Borders survey concluded that media self-censorship has risen in response to legal changes and government criticism.

Freedom House's Freedom in the World 2017 reports that "Internet access is not restricted" in Japan. Their Freedom on the Net reports have rated Japan's "Internet freedom status" as "free" every year since 2013 with scores of 22 each year except for 2017 when the score was 23 (where 0 is most free and 100 is least free). The slight decline in Internet freedom in 2017 was due to changes in the surveillance environment.

- The 2001 Provider Liability Limitation Act directed ISPs to establish a self-regulatory framework to govern take-down requests involving illegal or objectionable content, defamation, privacy violations, and copyright infringement. Industry associations produced guidelines where anyone can report material that infringes directly on their personal rights to the service provider, either to have it removed or to find out who posted it. No third party can do so. The provider notifies the individual who posted the content, and either fulfills the request with their permission or removes the content without the authors' approval if they fail to respond within two weeks. If the poster refuses permission, the service provider is authorized to assess the complaint for themselves, and comply if they believe it is legitimate.
- Legislation criminalizing the use of the Internet for child pornography and the solicitation of sex from minors was passed in 2003.
- ISPs voluntarily filter child pornography, and many offer parents the option to filter other immoral content to protect young internet users. Depictions of genitalia are pixelated to obscure them for Internet users based on Article 175 of the penal code, which governs obscenity. In recent years, content removals have focused on hate speech and obscene content, including child pornography, "revenge porn", explicit images shared without consent of the subject, and increasingly the "right to be forgotten" where search engines are required to unlink inaccurate or irrelevant material about specific individuals.
- Speech was limited for twelve days before the December 2012 election under a law banning campaigning online. The legislature overturned the law in April 2013, but kept restrictions on campaign e-mail.
- Amendments to the copyright law in 2012 criminalized intentionally downloading content that infringes on copyright. There were calls for civil rather than criminal penalties in such cases. Downloading this content may be punishable by up to 2 years' imprisonment.
- Anti-Korean and anti-Chinese hate speech proliferated online in 2012 and 2013 amid real-world territorial disputes.
- In 2013 new state secrets legislation criminalized both leaking and publishing broadly defined national secrets regardless of intent or content. A July 2014 review by the United Nations Human Rights Committee said the legislation laid out "a vague and broad definition of the matters that can be classified as secret" with "high criminal penalties that could generate a chilling effect on the activities of journalists and human rights defenders."
- A 2014 law dealing with revenge porn requires Internet providers to comply with takedown requests within two days.
- In April 2016 the UN special rapporteur on the right to freedom of opinion and expression said, "The independence of the press is facing serious threats." He noted "weak legal protection, the [new] Specially Designated Secrets Act, and persistent government pressure".

In March 2022, Japan enacted legislation establishing an internet police bureau and a special investigative team at the National Police Agency tasked with tackling serious cybercrime cases.

In July 2022, Japanese law banned "online insults", punishable by up to one year of imprisonment. Under this law, an "insult" is defined as "publicly demeaning someone's social standing without referring to specific facts about them or a specific action."

In February 2023, a proposal to introduce an Internet real-name system, similar to an existing one in China, was announced by Digital Minister Taro Kono. and he said: "If we first use the phone number card for authentication when creating accounts for various services such as social networking services, we can ensure that age restrictions are strictly observed, so I think the phone number card will be useful in this area as well." Digital Minister Kono stated that "some unsolicited videos are clearly criminal acts, and in such cases, people must be made aware of the fact that they are crimes", and that "putting videos on the Internet for fun will affect people's lives for a long time". He also stated that it is necessary to cooperate with the Ministry of Education, Culture, Sports, Science and Technology (MEXT) and others to provide guidance in the field of education in order to improve internet literacy.

== Use and effects of the Internet in Japan ==
Despite being referred to as "the Internet," Internet in Japan and other countries is not a singular medium. In reality, it is composed of many different media, including but not limited to: web sites, email, messengers, newspapers, and file sharing services. These sub-media are also used by many different people for a variety of purposes, and thus affects Japanese people, culture, and politics in varied and opposing ways.

Ultranationalist right-wing movements have a notable presence on the Japanese Internet, using it as a tool to communicate with other right-wing citizens and as a tool to launch attacks on other groups. The Kōdō-suru Hoshu, Action Conservative Movement, is a right-wing movement on the Internet that openly expresses xenophobic and racist attitudes towards those they perceive to threaten Japan's sovereignty and traditions. The ACM's criticism is directed at the political Left, Korean and Chinese people, North and South Korean and Chinese immigrants to Japan, women, people reliant on government assistance, and other minorities. However, their criticism is most prominently directed towards Zainichi Koreans, coining the term "Zainichi token" to claim that immigrants from Korea or descendants of Korean immigrants have special legal privileges due to their minority status. Part of the group's rise to prominence is attributed to the introduction of high-speed broadband Internet services in the 2000s, allowing them to spread extensive hostility and racism towards minority groups through services like YouTube, Niconico, and Ustream. However, the ACM can still be considered a minor social movement for multiple reasons. The organization representative of the ACM, the Zaitokukai, is estimated to contain as many as 120-thousand members, but still only represents 0.09% of the population as of 2012. Additionally, the movement's growth was negatively impacted by the arrest of multiple members due to the actions of a group referred to as Team Kansai. Furthermore, in-person performances by the group are primarily targeted towards online audiences, and have not directly resulted in major social movements. Nonetheless, it is still possible that discourse emerging from the online Action Conservative Movement has led public opinion and government policies to further discriminate against minority groups.

Despite xenophobic behavior of right-wing internet users in Japan, it is argued that the Internet can also increase tolerance for diversity and reduce xenophobic tendencies. Research on selective exposure theory (also referred to as confirmation bias) suggests that while people prefer information that confirms their ideologies, they do not hesitate to seek information that contradicts them. Japanese Internet users are more likely to encounter ideas that contradict their ideologies online due to the tendency towards higher diversity in online communities. The contact hypothesis supports the idea that encountering ideas of other groups in an online environment of equal cultural status can promote cooperation, solidarity, and social tolerance between these groups. Furthermore, this higher tolerance is realized both online and offline; users of the Internet not only are more likely to express support for the presence of foreign people in one's community, but are also more likely to reflect this tolerance in their behavior towards foreign people.

Although discrimination from right-wing internet users in Japan makes speaking out more difficult for minorities and the political Left, minorities and other disadvantaged groups have been able to utilize the internet to advocate for equal rights. For example, teachers in Japan facing the issue of overwork have been using social media such as Twitter to share their experiences and issues, which has garnered mainstream attention. In particular, teachers use social media to share information on number of hours worked and stories concerning consequences like death from overwork, discuss their own personal experiences, speak out against opposition and power figures who contribute to their issues, and report on the progress of movements towards better working conditions. Beyond serving as a tool to advocate for equal rights, the Internet has also helped to broaden previously small or isolated communities for minorities in Japan. For example, the Internet allows more homosexual Japanese people to connect with each other in a safe and private online space away from public judgement. Furthermore, it has helped homosexual people connect to Japanese gay culture and diversify representations of the group in media.

Beyond political and social effects, various studies have been carried out on how the Internet affects the health of adolescents in Japan. As of 2018, as many as 30.6% of students could be addicted to the Internet, although this percentage widely varies among different studies. Adolescent internet addiction can have a number of negative effects, such as academic deterioration, social withdrawal, loneliness, and interpersonal conflict. It is also suggested that unhappiness in adolescents is significantly associated with some aspects of problematic Internet usage patterns. This is not to say that Internet use itself is associated with unhappiness, or that it is a singular cause for unhappiness; the Internet in Japan has been shown to bring happiness to children as well. In the case that adolescents who use the Internet show signs of considering suicide, another study has suggested it is possible to use data online gathered from social media to detect these signs. A suggested strategy to help these adolescents is to search for social media accounts that display signs of suicidal thoughts and to post information with helpful resources for suicide prevention in a way that is accessible to these accounts.

== Usage of the Web ==
In Japan, "[o]nline communities like Ayashii World and Amezou" on the World Wide Web received acclaim from newspaper readers when they were established in the 1990s for the subversive and humorous commentary and comedy of their users.

== See also ==
- Communications in Japan
- Japan Network Access Point (JPNAP)
- Japan Network Information Center (JPNIC)
- Japan Registry Service (JPRS), manages the ".jp" top level domain.
- Line (software)
