= Ned Freed =

American IETF participant

Ned Freed (1959 – 22 May 2022) was an IETF participant and Request for Comments author who contributed to a significant number of Internet Protocol standards, mostly related to email. He is best known as the co-inventor of email MIME attachments, with Nathaniel Borenstein.

== Life ==
Edwin Earl "Ned" Freed was born in 1959 in Oklahoma City, Oklahoma. He graduated from Groton School in 1977. He was awarded a Bachelor of Science degree in Engineering from Harvey Mudd College in 1982.

After College he set up a company, Innosoft, with Kevin Carosso and Daniel Newman, working on PMDF messaging systems on DEC VAX systems. By 1993 he was involved in the MIME standard RFC1341.

From 1998 to 2000 he served as a member of the Internet Architecture Board. He then served on the Internet Engineering Steering Group from 2000 to 2004. He served as the IANA Media Types reviewer since 2000.

Ned worked for Oracle Corporation as an Architect.

He died on Sunday, May 22, 2022.

== Contributions ==
- Co-chair, dmarc, Domain-based Message Authentication, Reporting & Conformance. IETF working group, Applications area.
- Co-chair, imapmove, IMAP MOVE extension. IETF working group, Applications area. Concluded January 2013.
- Co-chair, nntpext, NNTP Extensions. IETF working group, Applications area. Concluded October 2005.
- Co-chair, notary, Notifications and Acknowledgements Requirements. IETF working group, Applications area. Concluded November 1995.
- Co-chair, receipt, Receipt Notifications for Internet Mail. IETF working group, Applications area. Concluded April 1998.
- Co-chair, rescap, Resource Capabilities Discovery. IETF working group, Applications area. Concluded October 2003.
- Co-chair, smtpext, Internet Mail Extensions. IETF working group, Applications area. Concluded March 1993.

He is the author or co-author of fifty IETF RFCs, most relating to e-mail or security. These include:

- RFC 9078, with Dave Crocker and R. Signes, Reaction: Indicating Summary Reaction to a Message,
- RFC 7103, with Murray Kucherawy and Gregory Shapiro, Advice for Safe Handling of Malformed Messages,
- RFC 6851, with Arnt Gulbrandsen, Internet Message Access Protocol (IMAP) - MOVE Extension,
- RFC 6838, with John Klensin and Tony Hansen, Media Type Specifications and Registration Procedures,
- RFC 6532, with Abel Yang and Shawn Steele, Internationalized Email Headers,
- RFC 6152, with John Klensin, Marshall Rose, and Dave Crocker, SMTP Service Extension for 8bit-MIMEtransport,
- RFC 6009, Sieve Email Filtering: Delivery Status Notifications and Deliver-By Extensions,
- RFC 5784, with Srinivas Saisatish Vedam, Sieve Email Filtering: Sieves and Display Directives in XML,
- RFC 5463, Sieve Email Filtering: Ihave Extension,
- RFC 5260, Sieve Email Filtering: Date and Index Extensions,
- RFC 5230, with Tim Showalter, Sieve Email Filtering: Vacation Extension,
- RFC 5183, Sieve Email Filtering: Environment Extension,
- RFC 4289, with John Klensin, Multipurpose Internet Mail Extensions (MIME) Part Four: Registration Procedures,
- RFC 2979, Behavior of and Requirements for Internet Firewalls,
- RFC 2978, with Jon Postel, IANA Charset Registration Procedures,
- RFC 2964, with Keith Moore, Use of HTTP State Management,
- RFC 2920, SMTP Service Extension for Command Pipelining,
- RFC 2789, with Steve Kille, Mail Monitoring MIB,
- RFC 2788, with Steve Kille, Network Services Monitoring MIB,
- RFC 2480, Gateways and MIME Security Multiparts,
- RFC 2442, with Daniel Newman, Jacques Belissent and Mark Hoy, The Batch SMTP Media Type,
- RFC 2231, with Keith Moore, MIME Parameter Value and Encoded Word Extensions: Character Sets, Languages, and Continuations,
- RFC 2049, with Nathaniel Borenstein, Multipurpose Internet Mail Extensions (MIME) Part Five: Conformance Criteria and Examples,
- RFC 2046, with Nathaniel Borenstein, Multipurpose Internet Mail Extensions (MIME) Part Two: Media Types,
- RFC 2045, with Nathaniel Borenstein, Multipurpose Internet Mail Extensions (MIME) Part One: Format of Internet Message Bodies,
- RFC 2034, SMTP Service Extension for Returning Enhanced Error Codes,
- RFC 2017, with Keith Moore and Alan Cargille, Definition of the URL MIME External-Body Access-Type,
- RFC 1870, with John Klensin and Keith Moore, SMTP Service Extension for Message Size Declaration,
- RFC 1869, with John Klensin, Marshall Rose, and Einar Stefferud, SMTP Service Extensions,
- RFC 1848, with Steve Crocker, James Galvin, and Sandy Murphy, MIME Object Security Services,
- RFC 1847, with James Galvin, Sandy Murphy, and Steve Crocker, Security Multiparts for MIME: Multipart/Signed and Multipart/Encrypted,
- RFC 1845, with Dave Crocker and Alan Cargille, SMTP Service Extension for Checkpoint/Restart.
