= Einar Stefferud =

American Internet pioneer (1930–2011)

Einar A. Stefferud (Stef) (11 January 1930 – 22 September 2011) was a computer researcher and entrepreneur, who made many significant contributions to the development of the Internet, particularly in the areas of IETF RFCs and standards, secure online payment systems, DNS, and secure email. Stefferud was one of the original designers of the MIME protocol for sending multimedia Internet electronic mail.

Creating new paradigms was part of Stefferud's life. This experience was presented in his classic talk, What is the Internet Paradigm?

== Career ==
Stefferud was born in Wausau, Wisconsin and earned a BA and MBA from University of California, Los Angeles. He was a Retired Adjunct Professor of Information and Computer Science at the University of California, Irvine.

Stefferud was active in ARPA/NSF/IETF DARPA Internet research and development since 1975. He was involved in pre-standards work for X.400/X.500 in the International Federation for Information Processing (IFIP) WG 6.5, and post-standards profiling in the National Institute of Standards and Technology OIW. He was involved in the US ANSI OSI Registration Authority; the US National Mail Transfer Service Interest Group (USMTS) and the IETF (Internet Engineering Task Force) where he has been involved with email standards development (e.g. MIME, SMTP Extensions and MHTML). He was Chair of IFIP Working Group 6.5 on Upper Layer Protocols, Architectures and Applications (ULPAA) from 1990 to 1996. He served as Chair of the 1988, 1990, 1992, 1994 IFIP WG 6.5 ULPAA Conferences.

Stefferud was founder (1969) and President of Network Management Associates, where he provided Strategic Technical and Management Advisory Information Services on internet environments until 2000. He was a co-founder (1994) and Chief Visionary Officer of First Virtual Holdings, called "the first cyberbank" by the Smithsonian Institution, that launched an Internet Payment System in October 1994. First Virtual technology and patents are still in current use.

Stefferud was honored by Communications Week Magazine as one of the Top 10 Visionaries in the Computer-Communications Industry for 1993. He was awarded Patent No. 5,757,917 with Marshall Rose and Nathaniel Borenstein for a "Computerized Payment System for Purchasing Goods and Services on the Internet".

In 1997 Stefferud, Brian K. Reid and Richard J. Sexton formed the Open Root Server Confederation as a potential organization to serve as an institutional version of Jon Postel's IANA, and a proposal was submitted to the US Government Department of Commerce NTIA, which eventually picked the joint Network Solutions/IANA proposal that became ICANN.

In 1999, at the end of the DNS domain name registry management discussions during the formation of ICANN, Stefferud was nominated Registry Advisory Board Member at Network Solutions (NSI), to provide independent external advisory review of the design and testing of the NSI Shared Registration System.

As the Internet developed, the next paradigm envisioned by Stefferud was trust. In the early days of the Internet every user was a trusted user, as authorized by DARPA, but this is no longer the case. Together with Ed Gerck, Stefferud was the co-founder (2001) of Network Manifold Associates Inc., working on the development of "target-free" technologies for secure Internet communications. Stefferud was also chairman of the NMA Advisory Board and was involved in the creation of "instant on" security products ZSentry and Zmail.

== Retirement ==
Stefferud retired in 2006. While his health still allowed, Stefferud was active on the Internet until 2007. He lived with his wife Donna in Huntington Beach, California, near his daughter, son-in-law, and three grandchildren.

== Publications ==
Among Stefferud's publications were:

- RFC 934, "Proposed standard for message encapsulation" (with Marshall Rose)
- RFC 1425, "SMTP Service Extensions" (with John Klensin, Ned Freed, Marshall Rose and Dave Crocker), later versions as RFC 1651 and RFC 1869
- RFC 1426, "SMTP Service Extension for 8it-MIMEtransport" (same collaborators), later version as RFC 1652
