= NSRC =

NSRC may refer to:

- National Service Reserve Corps, a disaster response unit under the Philippines' Office of Civil Defense
- National Sexuality Resource Center, an American organization advocating positive human sexuality representation
- Network Startup Resource Center, an American organization supporting Internet research and education networks
- North Stratford Railroad, an American interstate railroad
