= KAME project =

IPv6 and IPsec stack for BSD derivatives

The KAME project, a sub-project of the WIDE Project, was a joint effort of six organizations in Japan that aimed to provide a free IPv6 and IPsec (for both IPv4 and IPv6) protocol stack implementation for variants of the BSD Unix computer operating-system. The project began in 1998, and on November 7, 2005, it was announced that it would be finished at the end of March 2006. The name KAME is a short version of Karigome, the location of the project's offices beside Keio University SFC.

KAME Project's code is based on the "WIDE Hydrangea" IPv6/IPsec stack by WIDE Project.

The following organizations participated in the project:

- ALAXALA Networks Corporation
- Fujitsu
- Hitachi
- Internet Initiative Japan
- Keio University
- NEC
- University of Tokyo
- Toshiba
- Yokogawa Electric Corporation

FreeBSD, NetBSD and DragonFly BSD integrated IPsec and IPv6 code from the KAME project; OpenBSD integrated just IPv6 code rather than both (having developed their own IPsec stack). Linux also integrated code from the project in its native IPsec implementation.

The KAME project collaborated with the TAHI Project (which develops and provides verification-technology for IPv6), the USAGI Project and the WIDE Project.

== Racoon ==
racoon, KAME's user-space daemon, handles Internet Key Exchange (IKE). In Linux systems, it forms part of the ipsec-tools package.
