= Mimecast =

Information technology company

Mimecast Limited
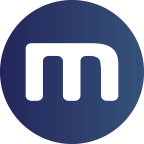
- Type: Private
- Industry: Information security
- Founded: 2003; 23 years ago
- Founders: Peter Bauer; Neil Murray
- Headquarters: London, England, UK (Global HQ); Lexington, Massachusetts, United States (North America HQ)
- Key people: Marc van Zadelhoff (CEO)
- Owner: Permira
- Number of employees: 2,000
- Website: mimecast.com

Mimecast Limited is a British information security company founded in 2003 and headquartered in London. It is specialized in email security and risk management and is owned by Permira, a British private equity firm.

== History ==
Mimecast was founded in 2003 by Peter Bauer and Neil Murray. Bauer was named CEO of the company, and Murray was named CTO. The company initially provided cloud-based email management services for Google Workspace, Microsoft Exchange and Microsoft Office 365.

In June 2010, Mimecast appointed Dr. Nathaniel Borenstein chief scientist. Borenstein co-created the Multipurpose Internet Mail Extensions (MIME) email standard, along with other email systems and software.

Five years later, Mimecast announced its registration statement for a proposed initial public offering (IPO). Mimecast began trading on the Nasdaq Global Select Market under the ticker symbol "MIME" in November 2015.

In January 2021, a Mimecast security certificate was compromised, potentially allowing attackers to intercept communications with Microsoft-based email servers.

In May 2022, Mimecast was acquired by and become a wholly-owned subsidiary of Magnesium Bidco Limited, an affiliate of Permira Holdings Ltd.

In January 2024, Marc van Zadelhoff replaced Bauer as the company's CEO.

=== Acquisitions ===
In July 2018, Mimecast acquired cybersecurity training start up Ataata. The same month, the company acquired Solebit. In November 2019, Mimecast acquired DMARC Analyzer.

The following January, Mimecast acquired Segasec. In January, 2024, Mimecast acquired human risk management specialist Elevate Security.

In July 2024, Mimecast acquired Code42. One month later, Mimecast acquired AI compliance software provider Aware.

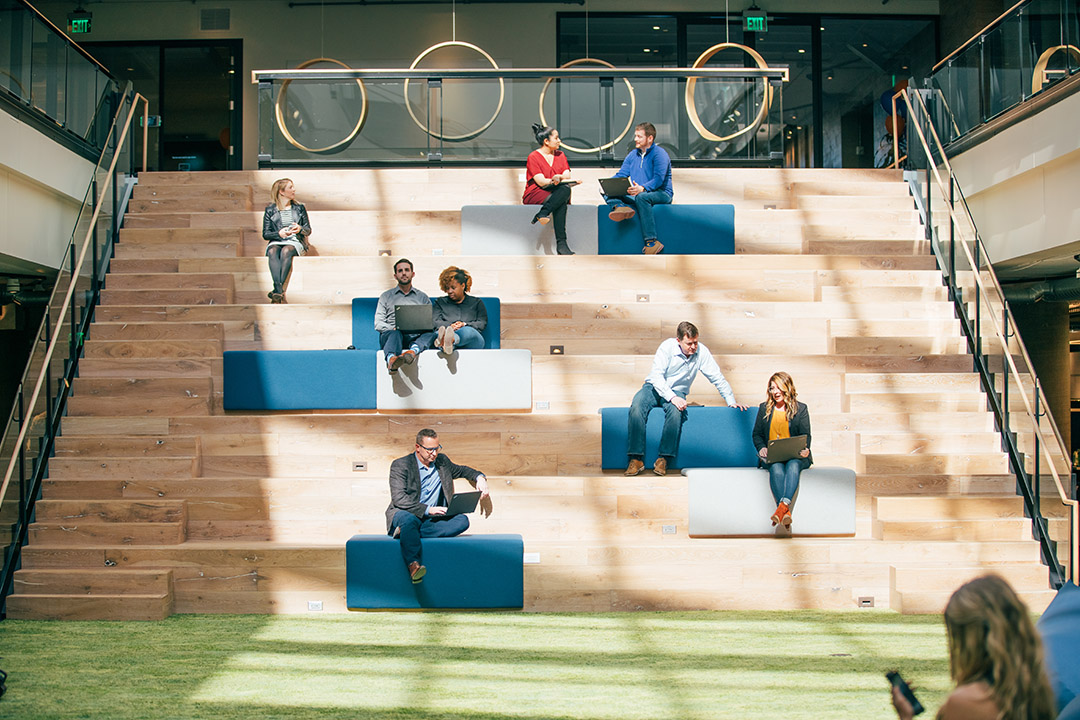
Mimecast North American Office in Lexington, MA

== Technology ==
Mimecast started as a cloud-based email management platform for Microsoft's email products, and after a series of acquisitions, expanded to be a more general provider of risk reduction services within organizations. Its services include email and collaboration security, insider risk management, data compliance, and security and awareness training.

== Operations ==
Mimecast's global headquarters is based in London. Its US headquarters is in Lexington, Massachusetts, just outside of Boston. The company operates additional offices in Bengaluru, Cape Town, Dubai, Hilversum, Israel, Johannesburg, Melbourne, Mississauga, Munich, Paris, Singapore, and Sydney.
