= .jp =

Top-level Internet domain for Japan

- Introduced: August 5, 1986; 39 years ago
- TLD type: Country code top-level domain
- Status: Active
- Registry: Japan Registry Services
- Sponsor: JPNIC
- Intended use: Entities connected with Japan
- Actual use: Very popular in Japan
- Registered domains: 1,830,999 (2026-02-02)
- Registration restrictions: Second-level registrations require a Japanese mailing address; third-level registrations have varying rules depending on which second-level name they are beneath
- Structure: Registrations permitted at second level and at third level beneath various second-level labels
- Documents: ICANN sponsorship agreement
- DNSSEC: Yes
- Registry website: jprs.co.jp/en/

.jp is the Internet country code top-level domain (ccTLD) for Japan. It was established in 1986 and is administered by the Japan Registry Services.

== History ==
At the establishment of the .jp domain, the domain was administered by the JPNIC, as part of their role as an overseeing technical body for the Internet in Japan. It was originally proposed by Jun Murai for the Information Sciences Institute at the University of Southern California on August 5, 1986. Handling of the domain was first managed within the "junet-admin" admin group, which was responsible for the operations of JUNET, an early computer network in which Murai was part of.

In April 1989, the junet-admin group began formally registering .jp domain names. However, due to the growing importance and size of the .jp registry, it was decided at the 11th General Meeting of JPNIC in December 2000 to create a new corporation that would manage the .jp domain. Thus, the Japan Registry Service was created, and on June 30, 2003, it officially assumed the duties of the .jp registry.

.jp registrations are only allowed if the registrant has a physical address in Japan. Registrations are processed via accredited registrars and domain names with Japanese characters (kanji, hiragana or katakana) may be registered at the second level.

== Second-level domains ==
While any party with a Japanese mailing address can get a second-level domain (example.jp), there are several restricted-use second-level domains, listed below.

- ac.jp: higher level academic institutions, such as universities
- ad.jp: JPNIC members
- co.jp: most forms of incorporated companies, including foreign companies registered in Japan
- ed.jp: educational institutions for individuals under 18
- go.jp: Japanese government ministries and their endeavours
- gr.jp: groups of two or more people, or groups of registered companies
- lg.jp: local government authorities
- ne.jp: network service providers
- or.jp: registered organisations and non-profit organisations

=== Geographical type jp domain names ===
- (organization).(cityname).(prefecturename).jp

Domains listed below are reserved for the local governments in Japan:

- metro.tokyo.jp: reserved for the government of Tokyo Metropolis
- pref.(prefecturename).jp: reserved for the prefectural government
- city.(cityname).jp: reserved for cities designated by government ordinance
- city.(cityname).(prefecturename).jp: reserved for non-designated cities and, wards and cities within Tokyo
- town.(townname).(prefecturename).jp: reserved for towns
- vill.(villagename).(prefecturename).jp: reserved for villages

== Internationalised top-level domains ==
Japan has considered registering an internationalised country code top-level domain, .日本. In 2008, a preliminary application was made. As of 2022, no such domain has been registered.

Private companies have registered the following internationalised generic top-level domains using Japanese script:

- minna (.みんな; everyone)
- sēru (.セール; sale)
- fasshon (.ファッション; fashion)
- sutoa (.ストア; store)
- pointo (.ポイント; point)
- kuraudo (.クラウド; cloud)
- komu (.コム; com), the most used Japanese script top-level domain

Cities or regions in Japan have registered these geographic top-level domains:

- .kyoto (Kyoto)
- .nagoya (Nagoya)
- .okinawa (Okinawa)
- .osaka (Osaka)
- .ryukyu (Ryukyu, a former kingdom, often used as a traditional alias of Okinawa)
- .tokyo (Tokyo)
- .yokohama (Yokohama)

== See also ==
- Domain Name System
- Country code top-level domain
