= Internet Initiative Japan =

Japanese telecommunications company

Internet Initiative Japan, Inc.

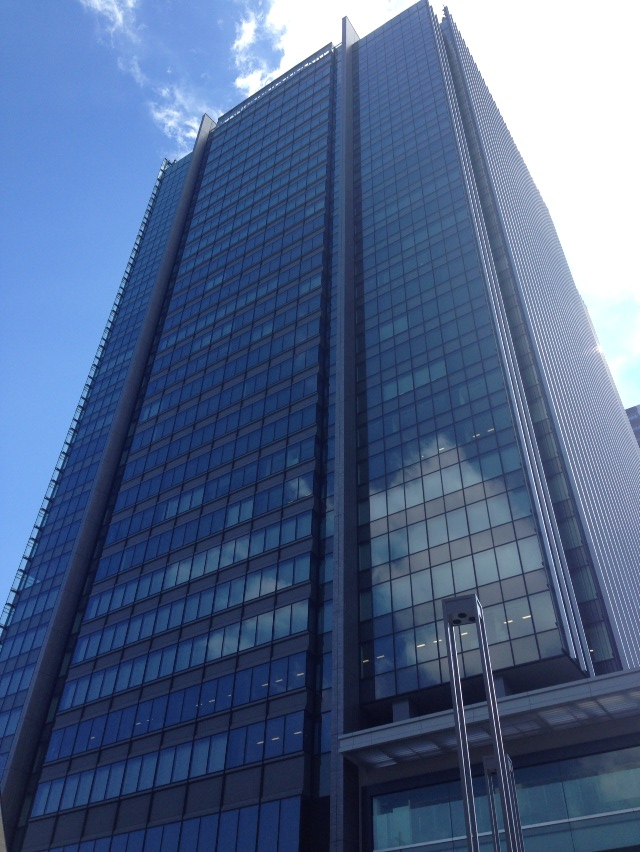
- Head Office
- Native name: 株式会社インターネットイニシアティブ
- Type: Public
- Traded as: TYO: 3774; Nasdaq: IIJI
- Industry: Internet service provider
- Founded: 1992; 34 years ago
- Founder: Koichi Suzuki(businessman)
- Key people: Koichi Suzuki (chairman and co-CEO); Eijiro Katsu (president and co-CEO)
- ASN: 2497
- Website: www.iij.ad.jp/en

Internet Initiative Japan (IIJ; Japanese: インターネットイニシアティブ) is a Japanese telecommunications company. Founded by Koichi Suzuki in 1992, it is Japan’s first Internet service provider (ISP).

From 1999 IIJ were listed on NASDAQ, USA (listed August 1999; ticker symbol IIJI) and as of 2006 were listed on the First Section of the Tokyo Stock Exchange (listed December 2006; stock ticker number: 3774). It was delisted on 22 April 2019.

== Overview ==
Since its inception in the early 1990s, Internet Initiative Japan (IIJ) has actively promoted peering with major domestic and international Internet Exchanges. As an independent IP-specialized ISP—distinct from traditional legacy carriers—IIJ constructed its own large-scale backbone connecting Japan's major cities. The company also contributed to regional infrastructure by helping develop A-Bone, an international backbone for the Asia-Pacific region. This project was managed through Asia Internet Holding Co., Ltd., established in 1995 and later merged into IIJ in 2005.

IIJ serves a customer base of over 11,000 organizations, including Japanese government agencies and private enterprises. The company holds a significant market share among large-scale corporations requiring complex systems integration. Notably, IIJ provides services to at least half of the top 10 companies in most Japanese industries, and the vast majority of leading firms in several key sectors.

IIJ was founded by core members of the WIDE Project, including Jun Murai and Shin Yoshimura. Due to these academic origins, the company remains an active participant in internet research, proof-of-concept trials, and international standardization efforts via the WIDE Project and EPCglobal. Compared to other Japanese ISPs, IIJ maintains a high ratio of investment in research and development (R&D).

In 1998, IIJ established Crosswave Communications (CWC) as a joint venture with Toyota and Sony, launching a pioneering wide-area Ethernet service. However, following the burst of the dot-com bubble and intensifying competition, CWC filed for corporate reorganization in August 2003. Its operations were transferred to NTT Communications that December. The resulting extraordinary loss led to a significant deficit for IIJ, resulting in the NTT Group becoming a major shareholder with a approximately 30% stake through a third-party allotment of new shares.
