= SOAP with Attachments =

SwA structure

SOAP with Attachments (SwA) or MIME for Web Services is the use of web services to send and receive files with a combination of SOAP and MIME, primarily over HTTP.

Note that SwA is not a new specification, but rather a mechanism for using the existing SOAP and MIME facilities to perfect the transmission of files using Web Services invocations.

== Status ==
SwA is a W3C Note. It was submitted as a proposal, but it was not adopted by the W3C. Instead, MTOM is the W3C Recommendation for handling binary data in SOAP messages. With the release of SOAP 1.2 additionally the note SOAP 1.2 Attachment Feature was published.

== See also ==
- DIME
- MTOM
- SOAP with Attachments API for Java
