= Network Startup Resource Center =

Nonprofit organization formed in 1992

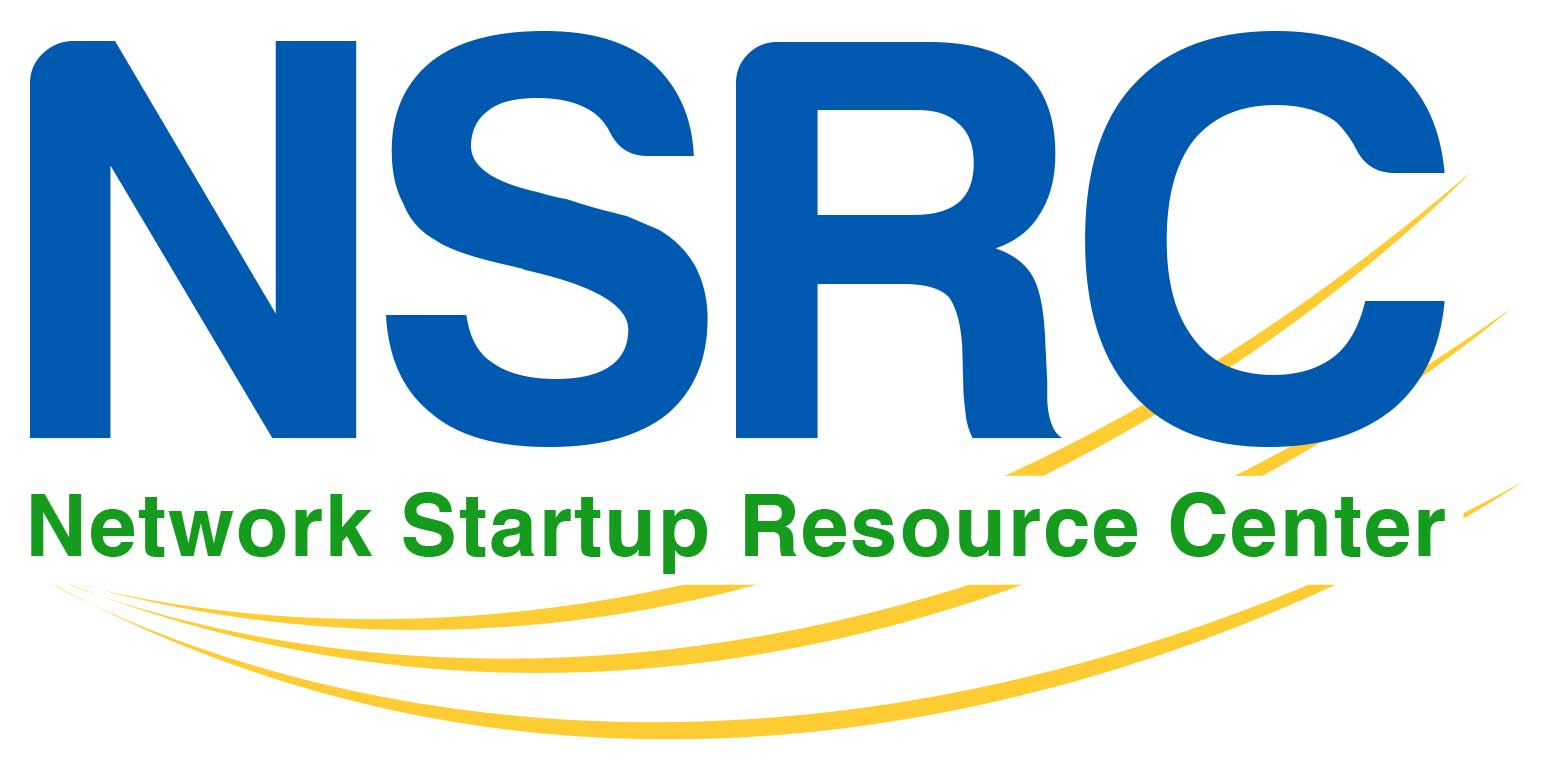
- Founded: November 1992; 33 years ago
- Founders: John Klensin; Randy Bush (scientist)
- Purpose: Network architecture and education
- Location: Eugene, Oregon, U.S.
- Region served: Worldwide
- Key people: Steve Huter (Director)
- Parent organization: University of Oregon
- Website: nsrc.org

The Network Startup Resource Center (NSRC) is a nonprofit organization, formed in 1992 and based at the University of Oregon. The organization supports deployment of Internet research and education networks in academic institutions and non-governmental organizations throughout the Asia Pacific region, Africa, Latin America and the Caribbean, and the Middle East. NSRC receives major funding and in-kind donations from the National Science Foundation (NSF), Google and Google.org, Cisco, O'Reilly Media, Vint Cerf, the Richard M. Karp Foundation, IDRC, Internet Society (ISOC), and many other institutional and private donors.

== History ==
In 1988, Randy Bush and John Klensin began providing pro bono technical support to network engineers in southern Africa. The program was formalized in 1992 with a grant from the U.S. National Science Foundation, and activities expanded to countries in Africa, Asia, and Latin America. NSRC officially moved to the University of Oregon in 1996 and operated as a service of the Computing Center until 2011. The Center is currently administered as a collaboration of the University Libraries and the Office of the Vice-President for Research and Innovation, under the leadership of Steven Huter.

== Activities ==
NSRC provides funding for different Network Operator Groups throughout the world, as well as in-kind equipment, training, and publications necessary to establish Internet connections. As of 2011, in-kind support valued at over $40 million USD had been provided in more than 100 countries. The NSRC's educational programs include workshops, seminars, hands-on technical training and short courses around the world. The goal of these programs is to train local resources and establish an ongoing support system for networking within the region. Work may be done in partnership with other organizations interested in supporting research and education networks in developing regions.

=== NSRC in Africa ===
The NSRC has worked for several years with organizations throughout Africa to help expand and stabilize the growing networks on the continent. Initially, the focus has been on teaching best practice around network and systems administration, plus the establishment of solid network monitoring systems in the region. There is a strong focus on enabling scientific research across the continent. While the drive to develop the networks continues, additional support is being offered around identity and access management through workshops as requested.

=== NSRC in Asia ===
Similar work to the efforts in Africa, the NSRC has coordinated various hardware donations from large vendors to help build national research and education networks in countries across Asia, including Indonesia, Myanmar, Bhutan, Guam, and Vanuatu.

=== NSRC in Latin America ===
In Latin America, the NSRC has assisted and trained local support to build national research and education networks in Panama and Guatemala.
