= MAWI =

The MAWI Working Group is a joint effort of Japanese network research and academic institutions to study the performance of networks and networking protocols in Japanese wide area networks.

MAWI is an acronym for the Measurement and Analysis on the WIDE Internet, or Measurement and Analysis of Wide-area Internet.

Sponsored by the WIDE Project, MAWI is a joint effort of Japanese network research and academic institutions with corporate sponsorship.

As one of the working groups of the WIDE Project, The MAWI working group focuses on traffic measurement analysis. In particular, the focus of the working group is long-term measurement on wide-area, global Internet. This group also collaborates with other working groups on measurement, and has been working on building a public traffic trace repository. Challenges include:

- collecting packet traces from the WIDE backbone network

(sampling method, automation, high-speed packet capturing)

- creating a large set of publicly available traces by removing or scrambling sensitive information

(development of tools and scrambling method)

- development of tools to analyze and visualize packet traces

Through these measurement activities, it intends to contribute to various aspects of Internet operations including stable operation of major internet infrastructures such as DNS and routing, design of flexible and efficient network topology, and deployment of IPv6.

International collaboration with the following organizations:

- CAIDA
- University of Waikato
- ICANN RSSAC
- ISC OARC
- USC/ISI
- INRIA
- CNRS
- AI3 partners

== History ==
Started : 2002/10/21

The MAWI Working Group Traffic Archive has trans-Pacific packet traces from 1999 to 2003, with each day's statistics giving the protocol breakdown and the ten biggest flows. Including outliers like June 18, 2000, when 57% of the packets were from DNS traffic.
