= Keio Shonan-Fujisawa Junior and Senior High School =

Private school in Fujisawa, Kanagawa, Japan

Coordinates: 35°23′17″N 139°25′38″E

Keio Shonan-Fujisawa Junior & Senior High School (慶應義塾湘南藤沢中・高等部)
- Fujisawa, Kanagawa; Japan

Information
- Type: Private Senior and Junior Co-educational
- Established: 1992
- Grades: 6
- Colours: blue & red
- Website: https://www.sfc-js.keio.ac.jp/

Keio Shonan-Fujisawa Junior & Senior High School (慶應義塾湘南藤沢中・高等部, Keiō Gijuku Shōnan Fujisawa Chū Kōtōbu) is located on the Shonan Fujisawa Campus of Keio University in Fujisawa, Kanagawa Prefecture, Japan. Since its founding in 1992, the school has been commonly known as Keio SFC, or simply SFC.

The overwhelming majority (99%) of its students advance to Keio University. In 2006, for example, out of 237 students who entered the senior or final year, 232 were admitted to the various campuses of Keio University.

== School ==
The school is one of five schools affiliated with Keio University. The school is a combined Junior and Senior High, with grades seven through twelve. There are an average of 210 students per grade in Junior High, with another 30 students joining in the first year of Senior High, bringing the total average to 240 students per grade. Most of the teachers teach in both the Junior and Senior schools, which share the same buildings, which is uncommon in Japan.

== Student life ==
Most students live in Kanagawa Prefecture and the typical commuting time is 90 minutes. About a quarter of the students are returnees who have lived abroad in various countries. Some of these students have a high English language proficiency, and the school emphasizes English education as well as information technology in its curriculum.

The school operates on a trimester system with a five-week summer vacation and a three-week break at the end spanning late December and early January.

Like other university-attached private high schools in Japan, students in their final year of high school are exempt from taking entrance exams in order to enter the affiliated university. Students in their last year can specify which Keio University faculty they wish to enter and are granted admission to a specific faculty dependent on their academic grades and other intangibles. This frees up enormous amounts of time for extracurricular activities. Most students belong to clubs of some sort (sports, music, arts, dance, etc.) and will typically spend 6 to 15 hours a week on club pursuits.

The school is co-educational and the number of boys and girls is effectively equal.

== Notable alumni ==
- Sayuri Hori, announcer for NHK
- Mio Matsumura, announcer for Fuji Television
- Mina Fujii, actress
- Natsuki Uchiyama, former member of AKB48
- Katsuhiro Suzuki, actor
- Taka, lead vocalist of One Ok Rock

== See also ==
- Keio University Shonan Fujisawa Campus
- Keio University
