= Code42 =

American software company

- Type: Private
- Industry: Software
- Founded: June 27, 2001; 25 years ago
- Founders: Matthew Dornquast; Brian Bispala; Mitch Coopet
- Headquarters: Minneapolis, Minnesota, U.S.
- Key people: Joe Payne (president & CEO); Maria Izurieta (CFO); Jadee Hanson (CIO & CISO); Rob Juncker (CTO)
- Products: Insider risk management software
- Owner: Mimecast (2024–present)
- Number of employees: 175 (2024)
- Website: www.code42.com

Code42 is an American cybersecurity software company based in Minneapolis specializing in insider risk management. It is the maker of the cloud-native data protection product Incydr and security microlearning product Instructor.

Code42's Incydr is a SaaS data-loss protection product. Incydr is designed to help enterprise security teams detect insider risks to data that could lead to data leak and data loss and insider threat breaches, and respond to them appropriately. Code42's Instructor is an integrated microlearning tool that allows security teams to send out security training videos to teach employees how to manage risk.

Code42 was acquired by Mimecast in 2024.

== History ==
Code42 was founded as an IT consulting company in 2001, by Matthew Dornquast, Brian Bispala, and Mitch Coopet. The company's name honors Douglas Adams, who authored Hitchhiker's Guide to the Galaxy and had died that year. In the book, the number 42 is the "answer to the ultimate question of life, the universe and everything".

Some of Code42's first projects included a redesign of Sun Country Airlines' website in 2002, a project for the retailer Target Corporation, and the ticket booking engine for Midwest Airlines. Income from the IT services business was used to fund product ideas for six years.

In 2006, the company planned to create a Facebook-like desktop application, but the project became too large and impractical. Code42 focused on the online storage element of the application, creating CrashPlan in 2007.

In June 2011, Code42 acquired a Minneapolis-based mobile development company, Recursive Awesome LLC, to support its software on mobile devices.

In 2012, Code42 raised $52.5 million in funding. The funding was the first distribution from a $100 million pool established in 2011 by Accel Partners to fund Big Data companies.

In 2013, Code42 developed, released and marketed a file sharing service called SharePlan. According to the Star Tribune, it competed with DropBox, but SharePlan used a PIN to access files and track users.

In October 2014, a revision of the software added features for regulatory compliance like Sarbanes-Oxley and options for a private, public or hybrid cloud deployment. It had a single login with Crashplan using a feature called the "Code42 EDGE Platform", which was improved in December 2014 with two-factor authentication features. Shareplan was discontinued in August 2015.

In mid 2015, former Eloqua CEO Joe Payne succeeded co-founder Matthew Dornquast as CEO. The company raised an additional $85 million in funding in October 2015.

On August 22, 2017, Code42 announced they were shutting down CrashPlan for Home, effective in October 2018. They were not accepting new subscriptions but would maintain existing subscriptions until the end of their existing subscription period, at which point the backups would be purged. The Home plans had been replaced by CrashPlan for Small Business, which are business-focused, although still possible to use for private purposes. Backups to friends/family are not supported in the new product, the company explained: "As we shift our business strategy to focus exclusively on enterprise and small business segments, you have two great options to continue getting the best backup solution."

In September 2020, Code42 launched Incydr, a SaaS data protection tool for enterprises. Incydr allows security teams to effectively mitigate file exposure and exfiltration risks without disrupting legitimate work and collaboration. Incydr guards intellectual property, source code and trade secrets. Incydr is Code42's flagship product.

Also in September 2020, Code42 leaders Joe Payne, Jadee Hanson, and Mark Wojtasiak, co-authored and published the book Inside Jobs: Why Insider Risk is the Biggest Cyber Threat You Can't Ignore. The book explores the problem of insider risk, what drives it, why they believe traditional methods of protecting company data are inadequate and what security leaders can do to keep their data secure.

On September 14, 2021, Code42 launched Code42 Instructor, a microlearning solution that improves insider risk awareness by training companies to be security-oriented. Instructor was later integrated with Incydr to allow company risk awareness teams to immediately send corrective lessons when risky employee behavior is detected.

In August 2022, Code42 announced that it had sold the CrashPlan side of its business to New York-based private equity firm Mill Point Capital to focus exclusively on the cybersecurity market. Mill Point Capital purchased CrashPlan for $250 million

In July 2024, Mimecast acquired Code42. The acquisition aimed at integrating Code42’s insider threat management and data loss prevention technologies into Mimecast’s Human Risk Management platform. The acquisition was part of a strategic shift to address human-centered cybersecurity risks. Code42 continues to operate as part of Mimecast.

== Products and services ==
Code42 is the maker of Incydr, software that allows security teams to mitigate file exposure and exfiltration risks without disrupting collaboration. Incydr displays information about what data is relevant, including how, when and where that data is moving, and who is moving it. It monitors the movement of all files, whether the activity is within a company's security protocols or not, and captures a copy of all exfiltrated files for security teams to reference. Even though Incydr monitors all file activity, it distinguishes between acceptable team collaboration and file sharing and events that represent risks to businesses.

Code42 also develops Instructor, a microlearning security tool which is available as a standalone product, or integrated with Incydr. It allows security teams to improve insider risk awareness by offering short training videos that can be sent to employees engaging in risky behaviors that may leave valuable company IP vulnerable. Video distribution can be targeted proactively to a general audience, situationally for specific users, or in response to risky behavior identified by employee activity.
