= Nathaniel Borenstein =

American computer scientist and co-designer of the MIME protocol

Nathaniel S. Borenstein
- Born: September 23, 1957 (age 68)
- Education: Carnegie Mellon University; Grinnell College
- Occupation: Computer Scientist
- Employer: Mimecast
- Known for: e-mail, MIME, Internet standards, email attachments
- Title: Chief Scientist
- Website: www.guppylake.com

Nathaniel S. Borenstein (born September 23, 1957) is an American computer scientist. He is one of the original designers of the MIME protocol for formatting multimedia Internet electronic mail and sent the first e-mail attachment.

== Biography ==
Borenstein received a B.A. in mathematics and religious studies from Grinnell College in 1980, and a Ph.D. in computer science from Carnegie Mellon University in 1985. Previously he attended Ohio State University (1974–75), Deep Springs College (1975–76), and the Hebrew University of Jerusalem (1978–79). While at CMU, he co-developed the email component of the Andrew Project. The Andrew Message System was the first multi-media electronic mail system to become used outside of a laboratory. In 1989 he became a member of technical staff at Bellcore (Bell Communications Research). There he developed a series of standards so the various electronic mail systems could exchange multimedia messages in a common way. He is responsible for sending the first MIME email attachment on March 11, 1992.

Borenstein was founder of First Virtual Holdings in 1994, called "the first cyberbank" by the Smithsonian Institution, and NetPOS.com in 2000. He worked at IBM as distinguished engineer starting in 2002 at Cambridge, Massachusetts. He then became chief scientist at email management company Mimecast in June 2010.

He is author of Programming As If People Mattered: Friendly Programs, Software Engineering, and Other Noble Delusions (Princeton University Press, 1994) ISBN 0-691-03763-9. He received the New York University Olive Branch Award for writing about peace in 1990, for an essay about his brief experience as a NATO consultant.

His mentors include his doctoral advisor and the director of the Andrew project, Jim Morris, and Einar Stefferud, who initiated the MIME and First Virtual work.

== Personal life ==
Borenstein lives with his wife, Trina, in Ann Arbor and Greenbush, Michigan; they have four grown daughters, and five grandchildren. He has been a vegetarian since 1972. He is a pacifist, named his web server and wireless network "ahimsa", and has worked for a mix of pacifist, leftist, and libertarian causes.

He was a child prodigy and had finished most of his high school curriculum by the end of third grade, before being restricted to studies at his own grade level beginning in fourth grade. In 1973, with the help of the ACLU, he became the first US student ever to be awarded money damages from his principal and school board, in Bexley, Ohio, for violating his freedom of speech in 1972, by sending him home for wearing a black armband on the second anniversary of the Kent State shootings.

He has three brothers, Eliot Borenstein, a Guggenheim Fellowship winner and professor at NYU; Seth Borenstein, Associated Press Senior Science Reporter; and Joe Borenstein, a contractor and investor.

== Authored Requests For Comments (RFCs) ==
- RFC 1341 – MIME (Multipurpose Internet Mail Extensions)
- RFC 1344 – Implications of MIME for Internet Mail Gateways
- RFC 1437 – The Extension of MIME Content-Types to a new Medium (April Fools' Day RFC)
- RFC 1524 – A User Agent Configuration Mechanism for Multimedia Mail Format Information
- RFC 2045 – MIME Part One: Format of Internet Message Bodies
- RFC 2046 – MIME Part Two: Media Types
- RFC 2049 – MIME Part Five: Conformance Criteria and Examples
