= John Klensin =

American computer scientist

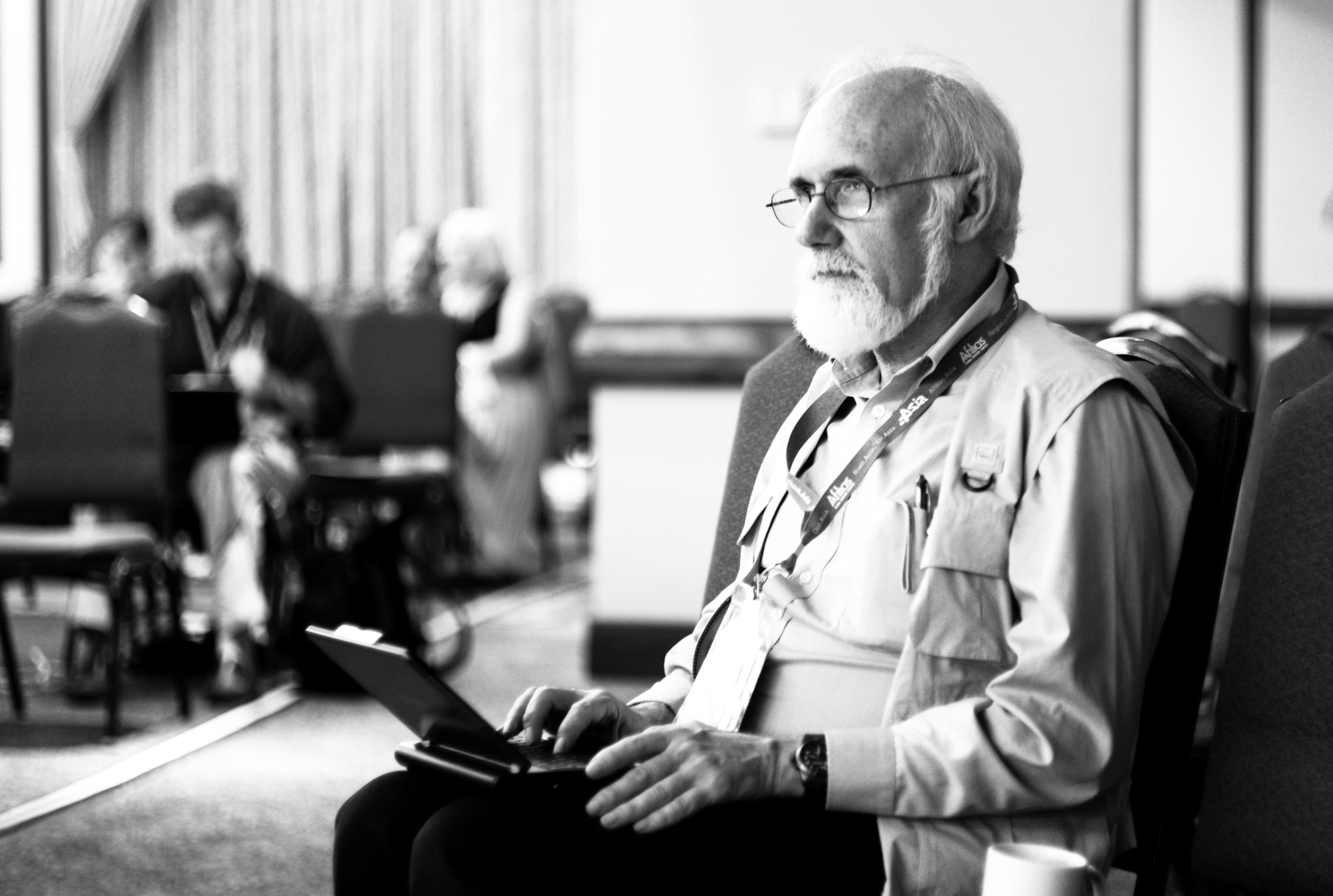
- John Klensin, 2007
- Citizenship: US
- Education: SB 1966, PhD 1979 Massachusetts Institute of Technology
- Known for: i18n, SMTP, MIME
- Awards: INCITS Merit Award, Fellow of the ACM, Internet Hall of Fame
- Scientific career
- Fields: Political Science, Computer Science
- Workplaces: MIT, MCI, AT&T
- Thesis: An evaluation of some geometric methods for automatic exploration of multivariate data. (1979)
- Doctoral advisor: Aaron Fleisher

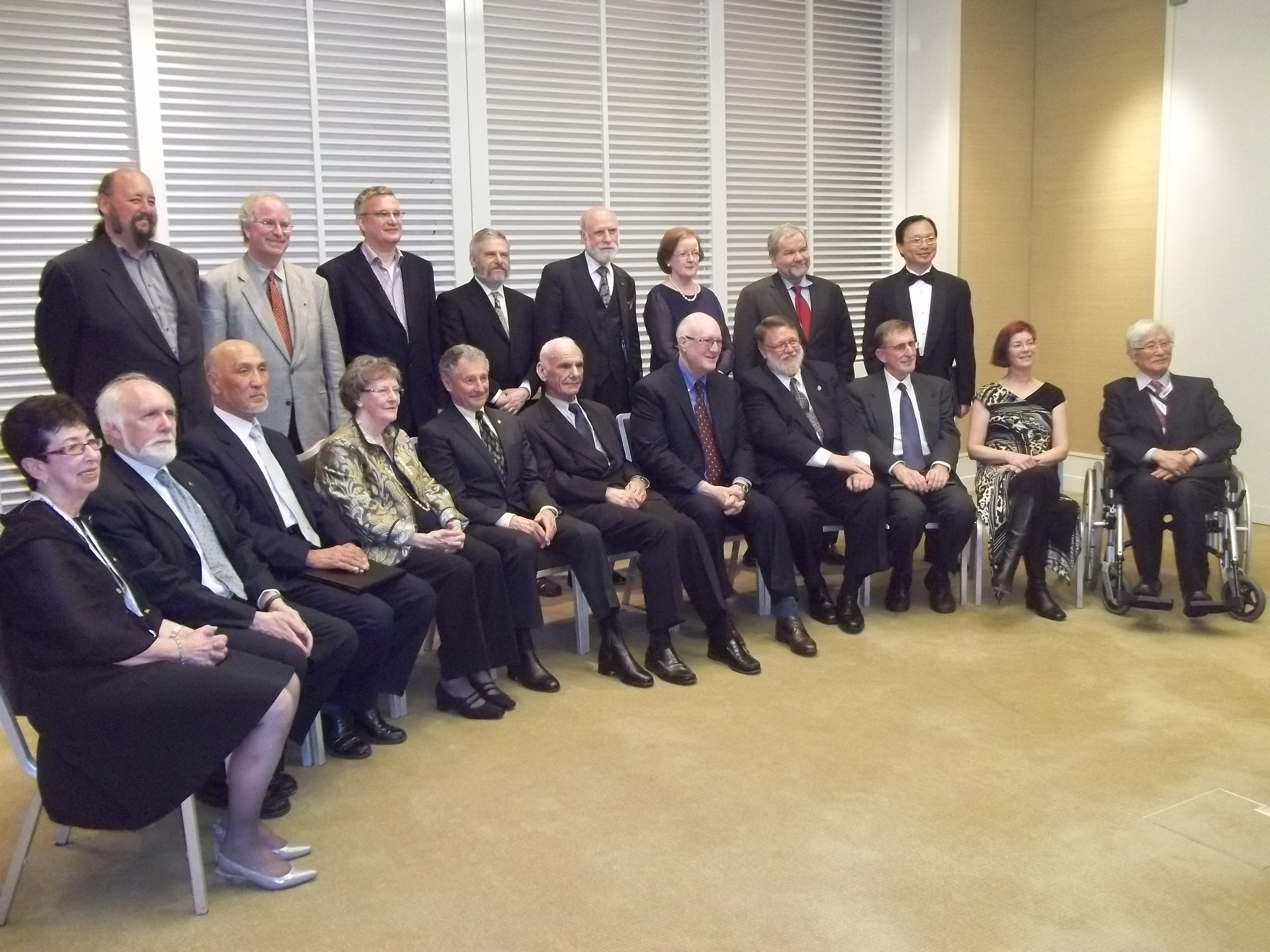
2012 Internet Hall of Fame inductees, including John Klensin (seated, second from left)

John C. Klensin is a political scientist and computer science professional who is active in Internet-related issues.

== Career ==
His career includes 30 years as a principal research scientist at MIT, including a period as INFOODS Project Coordinator for the United Nations University, distinguished engineering fellow at MCI WorldCom, and Internet architecture vice president at AT&T; he is now an independent consultant.

=== The Cambridge Project ===
Klensin was involved in The Cambridge Project, a social science data management cooperation project taking place at MIT, Harvard and other universities from 1969 to 1977. As a part of this program, John Klensin led the development of the Consistent System targeted for use by Social Scientists. The Consistent System ran on top of the Multics operating system.

=== Internet ===
His involvement with Internet protocols began in 1969, when he worked on the File Transfer Protocol.

In 1992, Randy Bush and John Klensin created the Network Startup Resource Center, helping dozens of countries to establish connections with FidoNet, UseNet, and when possible Internet.

==== IETF ====
Klensin is the author or co-editor of 60 RFCs, and has served as IETF Applications Area director 1993-1995, Internet Architecture Board member 1996-2002, and its chair 2000-2002. He again served on the Board from 2009 to 2011.

The RFCs written or edited by Klensin include SMTP (including RFC 4409 and RFC 5321), IDNA (including RFC 5890 and RFC 6055), Unicode (including RFC 5137 and RFC 5198), and other fields including CRAM-MD5 (RFC 2195) and IETF policies (RFC 3933). In March 2011 8BITMIME (RFC 6152) was published as Internet standard STD 71. In November 2011 Mail submission (RFC 6409) was published as STD 72.

His i18n work also included an April Fools' Day RFC in collaboration with Harald Alvestrand (RFC 5242) and MIME in collaboration with Ned Freed (RFC 4289 among others). As of 2011, he is a member of the RFC Independent Submissions Editorial Board. He is working on several Internet drafts.

== Awards and honours ==
- 2003 - INCITS Merit Award.
- 2007 - inducted as a Fellow of the Association for Computing Machinery.
- 2012 - inducted into the Internet Hall of Fame by the Internet Society.
