= Randy Bush (scientist) =

Computer scientist

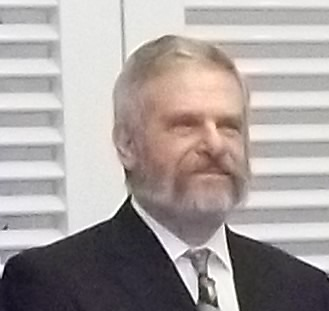
Randy Bush 2012 at the inaugural Internet Hall of Fame ceremony

Randy Bush is a fellow at Arrcus and a research fellow at Internet Initiative Japan. He was among the inaugural inductees into the Internet Hall of Fame in 2012, given by the Internet Society.

== Career ==
Bush has been working in the computer industry since 1966. He began with programming languages and specifically compilers. In 1977 he co-founded Northwest Microcomputer Systems with several other businessmen and computer engineers in Coos Bay, Oregon. The company released the 85/P, a Pascal development microcomputer, in 1978.

In the late 1980s and early 1990s, Bush played a role in bringing the Internet to South Africa.

Bush was the senior engineer of the Verio founding team in the late 1990s, and worked there for five years as the Vice President of IP Networking. He was the Principal Engineer at RAINet in the early 90s, which was later acquired by Verio at which time he joined Verio. He was the founder of the Network Startup Resource Center and worked there as a PI.

Bush has served as a member of the IESG. At APNIC, he has been the Routing SIG Co-Chair, Policy SIG Co-Chair, and the Fees Working Group Chair. He was on the founding board of ARIN, helped start AFRINIC, NANOG, etc. He was the chair of the ACM Internet Governance Committee. Bush also co-founded the Non-Commercial Domain Name Holders' Constituency within ICANN's DNSO.

Bush was one of the core architects and designers of the Resource Public Key Infrastructure (RPKI), Route Origin Validation, BGPsec, and a number of other associated technologies.

He has also been the technical contact for the .bz ccTLD, and has executed the technical operations for .ng.

Bush was a chair of the IETF Working Group on the DNS for a decade. Randy has been influential in setting up Internet networks in parts of Latin America, Southern and Eastern Africa, etc. He has also served as a Corporate researcher at AT&T for more than a year.

On November 27, 2023, at the 87th RIPE meeting in Rome, Bush was honored with the Rob Blokzijl Award.

== Publications ==
- Into the Future with the Internet Vendor Task Force A Very Curmudgeonly View or Testing Spaghetti — A Wall’s Point of View at Archive.psg.com
- A Basic FidoNet(r) Technical Standard Revision 16
- Home Page: PSG
- Profile: RAINet
- A list of all of his publications.
