= Solebit =

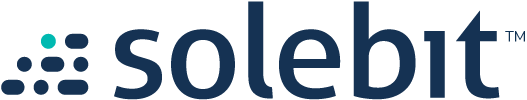
- Company type: Private
- Industry: Computer Security
- Founded: 2014
- Headquarters: San Francisco, California
- Key people: Boris Vaynberg, Co-Founder & CEO; Meni Farjon, Co-Founder & CTO; Yossi Sara, Co-Founder & VP Products
- Services: Malware Prevention
- Website: solebit.io

Solebit is a privately held cybersecurity company, with main offices located in the United States and Israel.

Solebit's cloud-based, real-time SaaS platform is focused on zero-day malware and unknown threats. Solebit blocks malicious active content with flow analysis, de-obfuscation and content evaluation.

Solebit's applications are in use by organizations in such industries as financial services, healthcare, information technology, public sector, and retail and consumer goods.

== Company ==
Solebit was founded in 2014 and maintains headquarters in San Francisco, California, with offices in Tel Aviv, Israel.

Solebit has received funding from venture capital/growth equity firms Glilot Capital Partners and MassMutual Ventures.

In March 2018, Solebit secured $11 million in Series A funding, led by ClearSky Security.

On July 31, 2018, Solebit was acquired by Mimecast for $100 million.

== Products ==
Solebit's core SoleGATE Security Platform is anchored by DvC, a real-time, signature-less engine, which identifies malware threats, regardless of evasion technique, file type, operating system, and client-side application, whether on-premise or in the cloud.

== See also ==
- Computer Security
- Zero-Day Threats
- Malware Prevention
- Sandbox Alternative
