= Northwest Microcomputer Systems =

American computer company active from 1977 to 1982

Northwest Microcomputer Systems, Inc.
- Type: Private
- Industry: Computer
- Founded: December 1977; 48 years ago
- Founders: Randy Bush; John Burles; Michael McKeown; William Massey; Jim Long; Jay Farr
- Defunct: c. 1982
- Fate: Dissolution
- Products: Microcomputers

Northwest Microcomputer Systems, Inc. (NMS), was a short-lived, privately owned American computer company active from 1977 to the early 1980s and based out of Oregon. The company was co-founded by several computer engineers and investors, including Randy Bush.

== History ==
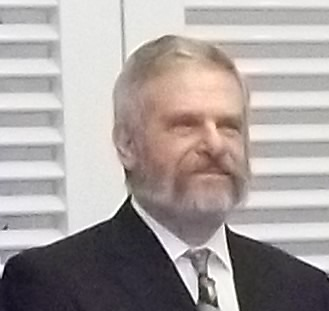
Randy Bush, pictured in 2012

Northwest Microcomputer was incorporated in December 1977 in Coos Bay, Oregon, by Randy Bush, John Burles, Michael McKeown, Jim Long, and Jay Farr. The firm was headquartered at 219 Fitzpatrick Building, on the site of the shopping mall that existed in Coos Bay at the time.

Bush was the company's principal founder; prior to founding Northwest, Bush had twelve years of experience in the computer industry as an engineer.

He was joined by McKeown, a Doctor of Science; Massey, also a physician, Long, a student of Marshfield High School who was hired as a programmer; John Burles, who was named accountant; and Jay Farr. Farr's other company, True Value Hardware, was Northwest's first client.

Northwest's first product was unveiled at the second annual West Coast Computer Faire in 1978 and given the name 85/P.

In May 1978, Northwest moved out from their Coos Bay mall headquarters for a bigger facility in Eugene, Oregon. The company that year expanded nationally; the new headquarters in Eugene were selected to lessen the burden on their manufacturing operations and spanned 2,500 square foot. It also became the site of the company's research and development laboratory. In 1979 they released a series of RAM and EPROM cards for STD Bus systems—a standard of computer bus architecture developed for industrial control systems.

The company survived into at least 1981 before going defunct.

=== 85/P ===
85/P
- Developer: Northwest Microcomputer Systems, Inc.
- Type: Microcomputer
- Released: 1978; 48 years ago
- Introductory price: $15,000
- Operating system: CP/M
- CPU: Intel 8085 @ 3 MHz
- Memory: 54 KB RAM
- Removable storage: Floppy disc
- Display: 12" CRT monitor, 80 x 24 characters
- Graphics: Character generator

The 85/P was intended as a Pascal development machine (the P stood for Pascal), and was an all-in-one computer that ran an Intel 8085 microprocessor clocked at 3 MHz and contained 54 KB of static RAM, direct memory access ability on the bus, and two 8-inch floppy disk drives built by Shugart Associates.

The computer's built-in 12-inch CRT monitor could display 80 columns by 24 lines, while the built-in Cherry keyboard had 103 keys and Hall effect switches. The entire computer was built into an enclosure made from natural wood.

The 85/P came shipped with numerous software packages, including the CP/M operating system, a BASIC interpreter and a Fortran compiler for CP/M, and a standalone Pascal compiler–interpreter. The latter could parse Pascal code at up to 725 lines per minute on the computer's 8085 processor.

The computer eschewed the hobbyist market in favor of small businesses, bookkeepers, and attorneys. Its original asking price of $15,000 was described as less than half the cost of a minicomputer of its processor class. The price was later reduced to $7,495 in 1978.
