= Mio Matsumura =

Japanese announcer (born 1986)

- 松村 未央
- Born: 29 June 1986 (age 39); Fujisawa, Kanagawa, Japan
- Other names: Miopan (ミオパン); Mio-chan (未央ちゃん); Macchan (まっちゃん); Match (マッチ, Macchi)
- Education: Keio University Faculty of Law Department of Political Science
- Years active: 2009–
- Employer: Fuji Television
- Television: Current; Sports Life Hero's News Corner; Ashita no Compass; Former; Mezanew; Miopan; FNN Minna no News Weekend; Sport!
- Spouse: Tomonori Jinnai (m. 2017)
- Children: 1
- Website: Fuji Television - Mio Matsumura

Mio Matsumura (松村 未央, Matsumura Mio; born 29 June 1986) is a Japanese female announcer for Fuji Television.

== Biography ==
Matsumura was born from Fujisawa, Kanagawa, she lived in Dallas for three and half years from fourth year in elementary school to first year of junior high school. After graduating from Keio Shonan-Fujisawa Junior and Senior High School and Keio University Faculty of Law Department of Political Science, she completed the same Media Communications Research Institute and joined Fuji Television on 1 April 2009.

Matsumura belonged to the tennis club since junior high school and was a team captain at the tennis circle Aleks when she was under college in four years. She also likes to swim, ballet, figure skating, artistic gymnastics, basketball etc., and her body is so flexible that Y-shaped legs are possible.

While having a part-time job at college, Matsumura was involved in Nippon TV promotional model and telop input work etc. Announcer Minami Tanaka (currently freelancer) and other stations synchronized with tarentos Yuri Takami, Misato Nagano and others, Takami is particularly close friends such as her birthday is different from the same place for a day.

Matsumura's TOEIC score is 940 points, STEP Eiken quasi first grade etc., fluent in the English language, directly interviewing Hollywood stars and foreign athletic players without intermediary language interpretation, contacting English well with film watching, books, magazines, newspaper articles etc. to keep in mind.

In addition to tennis and golf as a hobby, she likes to visit tasty restaurants. Matsumura lists cuisine, English conversations, piano etc. as special skills.

On 30 June 2017, a day after her 31st birthday, she officially married with an actor, Tomonori Jinnai.

She announced her pregnancy with her first child on 14 June 2018, and she went on maternity leave that September. On 31 October 2018, she gave birth to a healthy baby girl. She returned to work on August 13, 2020.

== Current programmes ==
| Year | Title |
|---|---|
| 2011 | Pro-Golfer TV |
| | Tokio Kakeru |
| 2015 | BS Fuji Live Prime News |
| | Professional Baseball News |
| 2016 | Sports Life Hero's |
| 2016 | Your Time: Quick & Asuno Tenki |
| 2017 | Flag7 |

=== Occasional appearances ===
| Year | Title | Ref. |
|---|---|---|
| 2010 | Mecha-Mecha Iketeru! "Owarai Geinin Uta ga hetana Ōzakettei-sen Special" | |
| 2010 | Minna no Keiba | |
| 2010 | Japanese Physicians Women's Open Golf Tournament | |
| 2010 | NEC Karuizawa 72 | |
| 2010 | Fujisankei Ladies Classic | |
| 2010 | Fujisankei Classic | |
| 2010 | Japan Figure Skating Championships | |
| 2010 | Four Continents Figure Skating Championships | |
| 2010 | World Figure Skating Championships | |
| 2011 | Kasupe! Owarai Geinin Uta ga umai Ōzakettei-sen Special | |
| 2011 | Peke×Pon | |
| 2013 | Exciting Time | |

== Former appearances ==
| Year | Title | Ref. |
|---|---|---|
| 2009 | Fuji Ana Studio: Marunama | |
| 2009 | Ana Ban! | |
| 2009 | Haneru no Tobira | |
| 2009 | L!ve Major League Baseball | |
| 2009 | FNN Speak | |
| 2009 | Spice TV dōmo Quininal! | |
| 2009 | Zekkei Nihon no Kenkō Aruki: Walking Plus | |
| 2009 | Otoko Obasan: Moero! Digital-bu | |
| 2009 | Campus Night Fuji | |
| 2009 | BS Fuji News | |
| 2009 | Mezamashi TV | |
| 2009 | Tonneruzu no Minasan no Okage deshita | |
| 2009 | Idoling!!! | |
| 2009 | Mezanew | |
| 2009 | Quiz! Hexagon II Chō Bakushō Quiz Parade!! Quiz dake janai yo 3-jikan SP "Dokkiri Award" | |
| 2009 | VS Arashi | |
| 2009 | Miopan | |
| 2009 | Sport! | |
| 2010 | Diamond Glove | |
| 2010 | Nande Suiri Show Hatena no Deguchi | |
| 2010 | Fuji San | |
| 2010 | Moshimo Tours | |
| 2010 | Bananaman no Blog Deka | |
| 2010 | Shiritagari! | |
| 2010 | Mezamashi Saturday | |
| 2010 | Home rarete Nobiru-kun | |
| 2010 | Waratte Iitomo! | |
| 2011 | Kinyōbi no Kiseki | |
| 2011 | Shin Shūkan Fuji TV Hihyō | |
| 2011 | BS Fuji Live Prime News | |
| 2011 | News Japan | |
| 2011 | Tenshi no Miyōshitsu: Kami ga Kawaku made... | |
| 2012 | Tsugiharu Ogiwara no Sports Break | |
| 2012 | Non Stop! | |
| 2012 | Professional Baseball News 2012 | |
| 2012 | Oku no Fukadō: Dōrui-kun no Tabi | |
| 2012 | FNN Super News | |
| 2013 | Uma Zuki'! | |
| 2014 | FNN Super News Weekend | |
| 2014 | Sekai Hot Journal | |
| 2015 | Ashita no Compass | |

=== Special programmes ===
| Year | Title |
|---|---|
| 2009 | FNS no Hi 26-jikan TV 2009 Chō Egao Parade Bakushō! Odaiba Gasshuku!! |
| 2009 | FNN Super Senkyo 2009 Shinpan no Hi |
| 2009 | Sekai Taisō Senshuken 2009 |
| 2010 | Joshi-Ana Special |
| 2010 | Owarai Geinin Oyako de Manzai Ōzakettei-sen Special |
| 2010 | Channel Alpha Ninki Drama Cast no Chōsen!!: Asia Saikyō Magician no Trick o Miyabure |
| 2010 | Channel Sigma Odaiba Gasshūkoku Totsunyū Special |
| 2010 | FNS no Hi 26-jikan TV 2010 Chō Egao Parade Kizuna / Bakushō Odaiba Gasshuku! |
| 2010 | Chō Do-kyū! Sekai no arienai Eizō 3 |
| 2010 | Ken Shimura no Baka Tonosama |
| 2010 | International Chiba Ekiden |
| 2011 | Tokyo Marathon 2011 |
| 2011 | FNS 27-jikan TV-Mecha-Mecha Dejitteru! Egao ni Narenakya TV janai jan!! |
| 2012 | Bakushō sokkuri monomane Kōhaku Uta Gassen Special |
| 2013 | IQ Sapuri |

=== TV dramas ===
| Year | Title |
|---|---|
| 2011 | Shinshun Special Drama Sazae-san 3 |
| 2013 | Umi no Ue no Shinryōsho |
| 2014 | Shitsuren Chocolatier |

=== Fuji Pod ===
| Year | Title |
|---|---|
| 2009 | Kyō no kyō! |
| 2009 | Tsuka Kin Friday |

=== Radio appearances ===
| Year | Title | Network |
|---|---|---|
| 2010 | All Night Nippon R | NBS |
| 2011 | Holiday Special: Fuji TV Aki mo yappari Mitoka Night: Nippon ni Kotoshi Ichiban no Ōen o! | NBS |

== Synchronization joined ==
- Ayako Yamanaka
- Yoshihito Fukui
- Shingo Tatemoto
