= Japan Registry Services =

- Industry: domain name registration
- Founded: December 26, 2000; 25 years ago
- Headquarters: Japan
- Area served: Worldwide
- Owner: Ministry of Internal Affairs and Communications
- Website: jprs.co.jp/en/

The Japan Registry Services Co., Ltd. (JPRS) was incorporated on December 26, 2000. The organization under the Japan Ministry of Internal Affairs and Communications manages the .jp ccTLD, including the operation Minister of Internal Affairs and Communications of the registry and DNS servers.

== History ==
JPRS came into existence out of a resolution at the 11th General Meeting of JPNIC, who had until then been managing the.jp domain. It was decided that due to the growing importance and complexity of the.jp domain, a separate corporation should be created with the purpose of running the registry.

In the period following the resolution, details were worked out, a structure was set up, and then on 2003-06-30, JPNIC, in co-operation with ICANN, transitioned the.jp domain to JPRS.

== Activities ==
JPRS is the registry for the .jp domain. In this capacity, they are responsible for the administration and operation of the.jp domain, interacting with the public through private registrars of record.

JPRS is also a participant in the internationalized domain names (IDN) effort, which seeks to allow non-ASCII characters to be used in domain names. JPRS supports Internationalizing Domain Names in Applications (IDNA) which is a system by which Japanese characters can be converted into an ASCII representation of those characters, allowing Japanese characters to be used in applications without the underlying DNS being altered.

== See also ==
- Domain Name System
- Country code top-level domain
