= Keith Moore =

American computer specialist (born 1960)

Keith Moore (born 12 October 1960) is the author and co-author of several IETF RFCs related to the MIME and SMTP protocols for electronic mail, among others:

- RFC 1870, defining a mechanism to allow SMTP clients and servers to avoid transferring messages so large that they will be rejected;
- RFC 2017, defining a (rarely implemented) means to allow MIME messages to contain attachments whose actual contents are referenced by a URL;
- RFC 2047 amended by RFC 2231, defining a mechanism to allow non-ASCII characters to be encoded in text portions of a message header (but not in email addresses);
- RFC 3461 obsoleting RFC 1891,
- RFC 3463 obsoleting RFC 1893,
- RFC 3464 obsoleting RFC 1894, which together define a standard mechanism for reporting of delivery failures or successes in Internet email,
- RFC 3834, standards for processes that automatically respond to electronic mail; and
- RFC 8314, recommending the use of TLS for email submission and access, and the deprecation of cleartext versions of the protocols used for those purposes.

He has also written or co-written RFCs on other topics, including

- RFC 2964, Use of HTTP State Management (recommending constraints on the use of "cookies" to address privacy concerns);
- RFC 3205, On the use of HTTP as a Substrate (discussing the use of HTTP as a layer underneath other protocols); and
- RFC 3056, describing the 6to4 mechanism for tunneling IPv6 packets over an IPv4 network.

He was born in Nashville, Tennessee, United States of America. He earned a Bachelor of Science degree in electrical engineering from Tennessee Technological University in 1985, and a Master of Science degree in computer science from the University of Tennessee in 1996.

From 1996 to 1999 he served as a member of the Internet Engineering Steering Group as one of two co-directors for the Applications Area.
