= Murray Kucherawy =

Computer scientist

Murray S. Kucherawy is a computer scientist, mostly known for his work on email standardization and open source software.

He originated in Canada where he studied Mathematics, specializing in Computer Science, Combinatorics and Optimization at the University of Waterloo, earning a Bachelor's degree in 1994.

He worked for several Internet companies, including Sendmail, Cloudmark, and Facebook, which is his current employer (as of 2022). At the same time, he led several IETF working groups, including MARF, WEIRDS, and DMARC. He also wrote several RFCs (see below) and papers. In concert with such activity, he created various open source software packages, including OpenDKIM and OpenDMARC, in the framework of The Trusted Domain Project.

== IETF contributions ==
- RFC 5451, Apr 2009, Message Header Field for Indicating Message Authentication Status
- RFC 5965, Aug 2010, An Extensible Format for Email Feedback Reports
- RFC 6008, Sep 2010, Authentication-Results Registration for Differentiating among Cryptographic Results
- RFC 6212, Apr 2011, Authentication-Results Registration for Vouch by Reference Results
- RFC 6376, Sep 2011, DomainKeys Identified Mail (DKIM) Signatures
- RFC 6377, Sep 2011, DomainKeys Identified Mail (DKIM) and Mailing Lists
- RFC 6522, Jan 2012, The Multipart/Report Media Type for the Reporting of Mail System Administrative Messages
- RFC 6541, Feb 2012, DomainKeys Identified Mail (DKIM) Authorized Third-Party Signatures
- RFC 6577, Mar 2012, Authentication-Results Registration Update for Sender Policy Framework (SPF) Results
- RFC 6590, Apr 2012, Redaction of Potentially Sensitive Data from Mail Abuse Reports
- RFC 6647, Jun 2012, Email Greylisting: An Applicability Statement for SMTP
- RFC 6650, Jun 2012, Creation and Use of Email Feedback Reports: An Applicability Statement for the Abuse Reporting Format (ARF)
- RFC 6651, Jun 2012, Extensions to DomainKeys Identified Mail (DKIM) for Failure Reporting
- RFC 6686, Jul 2012, Resolution of the Sender Policy Framework (SPF) and Sender ID Experiments
- RFC 6692, Jul 2012, Source Ports in Abuse Reporting Format (ARF) Reports
- RFC 6729, Sep 2012, Indicating Email Handling States in Trace Fields
- RFC 7001, Sep 2013, Message Header Field for Indicating Message Authentication Status
- RFC 7070, Nov 2013, An Architecture for Reputation Reporting
- RFC 7071, Nov 2013, A Media Type for Reputation Interchange
- RFC 7072, Nov 2013, A Reputation Query Protocol
- RFC 7073, Nov 2013, A Reputation Response Set for Email Identifiers
- RFC 7103, Jan 2014, Advice for Safe Handling of Malformed Messages
- RFC 7293, Jul 2014, The Require-Recipient-Valid-Since Header Field and SMTP Service Extension
- RFC 7372, Sep 2014, Email Authentication Status Codes
- RFC 7410, Dec 2014, A Property Types Registry for the Authentication-Results Header Field
- RFC 7437, Jan 2015, IAB, IESG, and IAOC Selection, Confirmation, and Recall Process: Operation of the Nominating and Recall Committees
- RFC 7489, Mar 2015, Domain-based Message Authentication, Reporting, and Conformance (DMARC)
- RFC 7601, Aug 2015, Message Header Field for Indicating Message Authentication Status
- RFC 8478, Oct 2018, Zstandard Compression and the application/zstd Media Type 1 RFC
- RFC 8601, May 2019, Message Header Field for Indicating Message Authentication Status
- RFC 8617, Jul 2019, The Authenticated Received Chain (ARC) Protocol
- RFC 8713, Feb 2020, IAB, IESG, IETF Trust, and IETF LLC Selection, Confirmation, and Recall Process: Operation of the IETF Nominating and Recall Committees
- RFC 8878, Feb 2021, Zstandard Compression and the 'application/zstd' Media Type
