= Japan University Network =

Computer network

Japan University Network (JUNET) was a computer network established by three universities, namely the University of Tokyo, the Tokyo Institute of Technology and Keio University, in October 1984 for test and research purposes. At its height it connected 700 machines. Comparable to the model of the American Usenet, it employed a UUCP implementation over telephone line. JUNET played an important role in the development of the Internet in Japan. It was made obsolete with the development and growing popularity of the WIDE Project, and was discontinued in October 1994.

== Size and Growth of the Network ==
JUNET grew from a few organizations in 1984 to over 250 nodes in 87 organizations by July 1987.
