= Japan Network Information Center =

The Japan Network Information Center (JPNIC) is the National Internet Registry in Japan that manages several aspects of Internet operations, including the allocation of IP addresses and AS numbers. It was established in the same year as APNIC, 1993.

Historically, JPNIC managed the .jp top-level domain; on 2003-06-30 the management of the .jp domain was transferred to the Japan Registry Service.

JPNIC is a non-profit organization, made up of many members of the Japanese Internet community that have a stake in the internet in Japan. As such, JPNIC provides information, research, and education services to its members, and to the Internet community at large.
