= WIDE Project =

Early Internet creator in Japan

The WIDE Project (Widely Integrated Distributed Environment) is an Internet project in Japan founded by Keio University, Tokyo Institute of Technology, and The University of Tokyo that was started in 1985. It runs a major backbone of the Japanese internet and used to run the .jp Top Level Domain (TLD). WIDE aims to integrate academia and industry in a single group that overcomes lines between organizations as an autonomous force utilizing new technologies for a better society. This mission has guided the actions of the project for two decades and will continue to be a cornerstone of its activities.

The president is Jun Murai, a professor of Keio University SFC. It has operated the M root nameserver since 1997. It has been a core proponent of IPv6 research (KAME project), development and deployment in Japan.

The project was started as the WIDE Research Group in 1985. The WIDE project also conducted a study about the instability of the intra-domain routing which was presented on the Routing Workgroup of the RIPE-49 meeting in 2004.

== DNS operation ==
The WIDE Project run 23 DNS sites as of 20th May 2025. Their IPv4 is 202.12.27.33, and their IPv6 is 2001:dc3::35.

== See also ==
- MAWI
