= List of things named after Alan Turing =

List

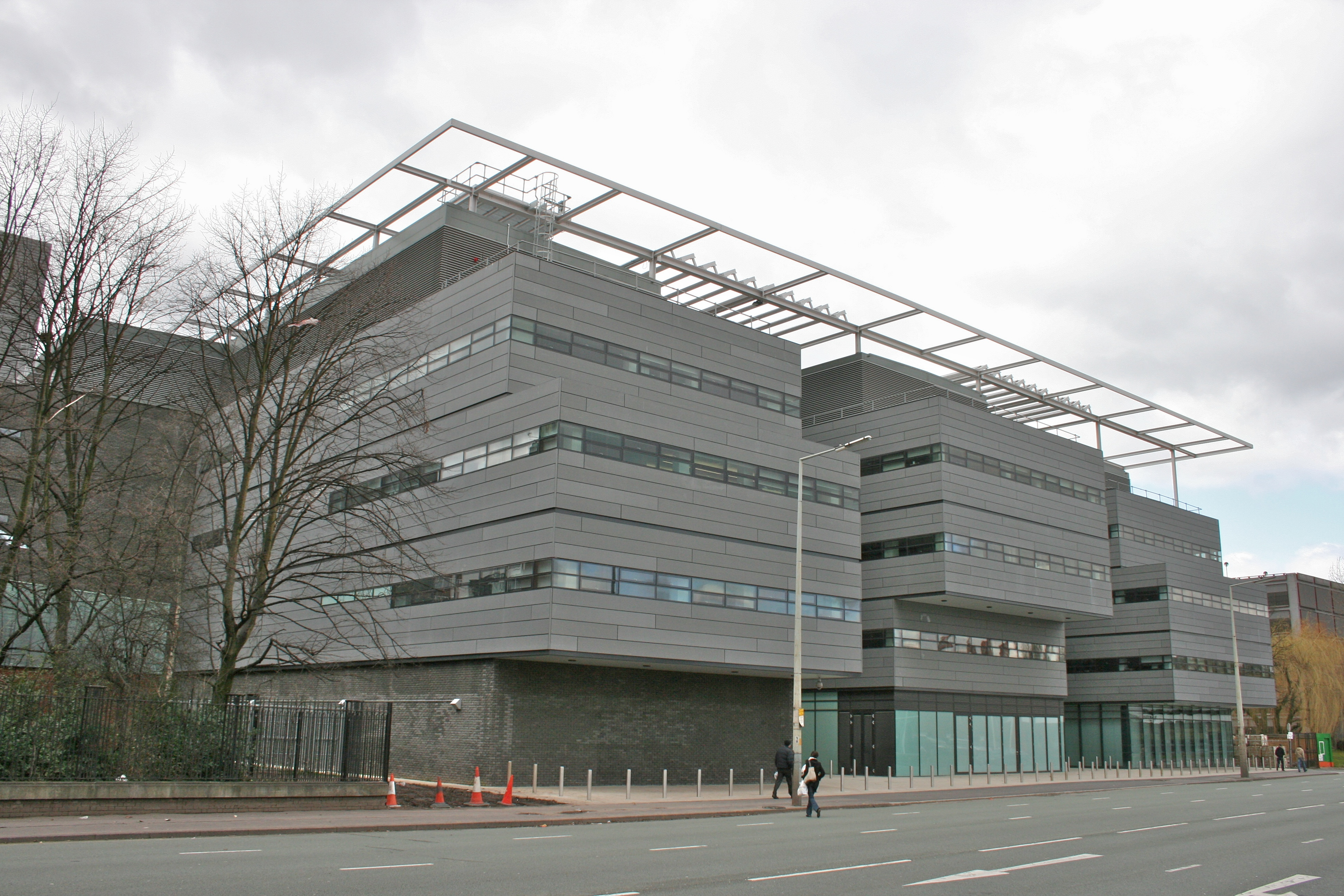
The Alan Turing Building at the University of Manchester, England

Alan Turing (1912–1954), a pioneer computer scientist, mathematician, and philosopher, is the eponym of all of the things listed below.

- Alan Turing Building, Manchester, England
- The Turing School, Eastbourne, England
- Alan Turing Centenary Conference, Manchester, England
- Alan Turing Institute, London, England
- Alan Turing law
- Alan Turing Memorial, Manchester, England
- Alan Turing sculpture, Eugene, Oregon, United States
- Statue of Alan Turing, Bletchley Park, England
- Alan Turing: The Enigma
- Alan Turing Year
- The Annotated Turing
- Church–Turing thesis
- Church–Turing–Deutsch principle
- Good–Turing frequency estimation
- Object-Oriented Turing (programming language)
- Super-Turing computation
- Turing-acceptable language
- Turing Award
- Turing (cipher)
- Turing College, Kent, England
- Turing completeness
- Turing computability
- Turing degree
- Turing Foundation, Amsterdam, Netherlands
- Turing Gateway to Mathematics, Cambridge, England
- The Turing Guide
- Turing House School
- Turing Institute, Glasgow, Scotland
- Turing jump
- Turing Lecture
- Turing machine
  - Alternating Turing machine
  - Multi-track Turing machine
  - Multitape Turing machine
  - Neural Turing machine
  - Non-deterministic Turing machine
  - Post–Turing machine
  - Probabilistic Turing machine
  - Quantum Turing machine
  - Read-only right moving Turing machines
  - Read-only Turing machine
  - Symmetric Turing machine
  - Unambiguous Turing machine
  - Universal Turing machine
  - Wolfram's 2-state 3-symbol Turing machine
- Turing Machine (band)
- Turing (microarchitecture)
- Turing OS
- Turing pattern
- Turing Pharmaceuticals
- Turing (programming language)
- Turing reduction
- Turing Robot, China
- Turing scheme
- Turing table
- Turing tarpit
- Turing test
  - CAPTCHA (Completely Automated Public Turing test to tell Computers and Humans Apart)
  - Computer game bot Turing Test
  - Graphics Turing Test
  - Reverse Turing test
  - Subject matter expert Turing test
  - The Turing Test (novel)
  - The Turing Test (video game)
  - Visual Turing Test
- The Turing Trust
- Turing Tumble
- Turing's method
- Turing's proof
- Turing's Wager
- Turing+ (programming language)
- Turing.jl (probabilistic programming)
- Turingery
- Turingismus
- Turmite
- Turochamp

Other items

- Alan Turing (MI) Building, University of Wolverhampton, England
- Turing Street, East London, England
- Turing Gate, Bletchley
- Turing Close, Leeds
- NE Turing Street, near Microsoft headquarters in Redmond, Washington
- Turing Center for Living Systems, interdisciplinary research center, Marseille, France

== See also ==
- Bank of England £50 note (in 2021)
- Turing baronetcy
- Turing (disambiguation)
