= Turing (disambiguation) =

Alan Turing (1912–1954) was a British mathematician, logician, cryptanalyst and computer scientist.

Turing may also refer to:

== People ==
- Turing baronets, a title in the Baronetage of Nova Scotia, including a list of baronets
  - Dermot Turing (born 1961), British solicitor and author
- Fanny Jean Turing (1862–1934), British politician
- Sydney Turing Barlow Lawford (1865–1953), British general, father of Peter Lawford
- Turing (drag queen) (born 1992), Filipino drag queen

== Fictional characters ==
- Angelica Turing, in Sense8
- Turing, in video game 2064: Read Only Memories

== Other uses ==
- Turing (cipher), a cryptographic stream cipher
- Turing (microarchitecture), by Nvidia
- Turing (programming language)
- Turing Award, the annual award by the Association for Computing Machinery

== See also ==
- List of things named after Alan Turing
- Turing machine (disambiguation)
- Turing test (disambiguation)
- Turing completeness, ability of a computing system to simulate Turing machines
