= Corinne Vigreux =

French business executive and entrepreneur

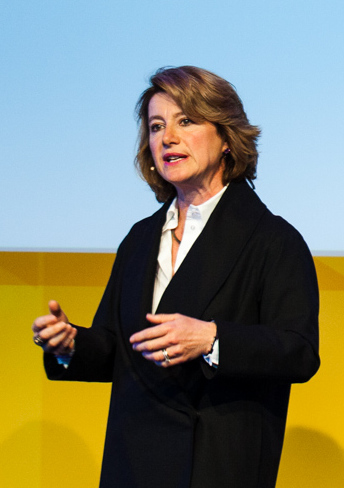
- Vigreux in 2015
- Born: 9 December 1964 (age 61); Lyon, France
- Education: ESSEC Business School
- Occupation: Businesswoman
- Years active: 1986–present
- Title: Co-founder of TomTom and MD of its consumer business
- Spouse: Harold Goddijn
- Children: 2

Corinne Danièle Goddijn-Vigreux, commonly known as Corinne Vigreux (born 9 December 1964), is a French business executive and entrepreneur. She is a co-founder of the Dutch consumer electronics company TomTom where she has been Managing Director of the Consumer Business Unit since 2008.

== Early life and education ==
Born in Lyon, France, in 1964, Vigreux was brought up in the working-class suburb of Vaulx-en-Velin where her father was a commercial buyer for a chemical company and her mother, a pharmacy dispenser. After specializing in physics and maths at school (Lycée du Parc), she studied at the ESSEC Business School in Paris where she graduated in international business in 1987.

== Career ==
In 1987, Vigreux started working in London for the Psion consumer electronics company where she managed exports, travelling to North Africa, Israel and around Europe. While working at Psion, she met Harold Goddijn who was interested in distributing the company's products in the Netherlands. They married in 1991 and moved to the Netherlands where for a few months she worked for a dairy cooperative while her husband worked for Psion. Attracted back to technology, Vigreux teamed up with two of Goddijn's friends, Peter-Frans Pauwels and Pieter Geelen, and founded Palmtop Software which later became TomTom.

Initially, Palmtop produced products for popular handheld devices but by the early 2000s, Vigreux and her colleagues realized there were opportunities for producing dedicated mapping devices after Bill Clinton opened up the military GPS system for generalized access. The TomTom, the first stand-alone navigating device, with its own touchscreen facility, was released in March 2004. The market exploded over the next four years with revenues increasing from €42 million to €1.8 billion. In 2008, Vigreux was appointed managing director, sales director and chief commercial officer for TomTom, positions she still holds.

In recent years, the satnav sector has suffered from Google's development of mapping systems for smartphones. Vigreux subsequently led TomTom's entry into the sport watches for everyday athletes and in April 2015 launched TomTom Bandit a highly innovative action camera. Nevertheless, Vigreux sees new opportunities for mapping systems in applications for self-driving vehicles.

Corinne Vigreux founded CODAM, a new coding college in the heart of Amsterdam. CODAM is a private, nonprofit and tuition-free computer programming school. Codam builds on the pioneering work of 42 School in Paris.

== Boards and honors ==
Vigreux has served as the Chairman of the Board of Trustees at the Sofronie Foundation since January 2006. The Sofronie Foundation works with charities and not for profit organisations that focus on improving the lives of disadvantaged young people through educational or vocational programmes.

In May 2016, Vigreaux was elected as an independent member of the Board of Directors for a term of four years at ILIAD, a parent company of Free.

Vigreux is on the Board of the French Chamber of Commerce and Industry in the Netherlands (CFCI) and a member of the Conseil de Coopération Franco-Néerlandais (CCFN). She is also on the advisory board of the Dutch National Opera & Ballet.

In 2012, she was decorated as a Knight of the Legion of Honour for her business success and social commitment.

In October 2016, Vigreux was elected member of the advisory board at Takeaway.com. The next month, she was decorated "Officier in de Orde van Oranje-Nassau".

== Personal life ==
Vigreux, who now lives in Amsterdam, is married to Harold Goddijn who is chairman and managing director of TomTom. The couple have two children studying at universities.
