= Harold Goddijn =

Dutch businessman

- Born: 23 April 1960 (age 66); Oegstgeest, Netherlands
- Education: University of Amsterdam (attended)
- Years active: 1986–present
- Employer: TomTom (1991–present)
- Known for: Co-founder and CEO of TomTom
- Title: CEO at TomTom
- Spouse: Corinne Vigreux
- Children: 2

Harold Goddijn (born April 23, 1960) is the CEO of the Dutch consumer/business electronics company TomTom since 2001.

== Early life and education ==
He studied Economics at the University of Amsterdam from 1982 till 1986.

== Early career ==
Goddijn started his career with a venture capital firm. He then founded Psion Netherlands BV in 1989 as a joint venture with Psion computers Plc. In 1998 he was appointed Managing Director of Psion Computers and served on the Board of Psion Plc from 1998 to 1999. In 1999, Harold Goddijn left Psion and joined Palmtop Software.

== TomTom ==
In 1991, Goddijn's wife Corinne Vigreux left her position as sales director for Psion to help found Palmtop Software; a company that specializes in creating applications for portable pocket computers. Goddijn invested in Palmtop Software, building a partnership with the co-founders Peter-Frans Pauwels and Pieter Geelen (who are still running the company with him today). Palmtop Software completely changed their name and their image and is now known as TomTom.

In 2001, Harold was appointed Chief Executive Officer of TomTom, a role he has held ever since. During this time, he focused the business on developing navigation software, launching the TomTom Navigator in 2002. Next, Harold made the decision to move into manufacturing hardware solutions, launching the first TomTom GO in 2004. TomTom has gone on to sell more than 75 million navigation devices globally. Today, more than one billion people use TomTom technology every day.

After licensing its digital maps to Apple (company) for its in-house maps app and signed a multi-year deal with Uber to provide it with digital maps, the company has been building up its map making tech that will work in conjunction with the numerous sensors appearing on cars today to enable autonomous driving cars.

== Other commitment ==
He is chair of the Comité Ondernemerschap en Financiering, advising the Minister of Finance.

== Personal life ==
Goddijn, who now lives in Amsterdam, is married to Corinne Vigreux who is Co-Founder and Managing Director of the Consumer Business Unit since 2008 at TomTom. The couple have two children studying at universities.
