= Turing equivalence =

Turing equivalence may refer to:

- As related to Turing completeness, Turing equivalence means having computational power equivalent to a universal Turing machine
- Turing degree equivalence (of sets), having the same level of unsolvability

== See also ==
- Turing machine equivalents
- Turing test (disambiguation)
