= Prof: Alan Turing Decoded =

2015 biography of Alan Turing

- First edition cover
- Author: Dermot Turing
- Subject: Alan Turing
- Genre: Biography
- Publisher: The History Press
- Publication date: 15 September 2015
- Media type: Hardback, audiobook
- Pages: 320 pp.
- ISBN: 9781841656434

Prof: Alan Turing Decoded is a 2015 biography of Alan Turing, a 20th-century mathematician and computer scientist, authored by his nephew Dermot Turing. Written in a non-academic style, it begins with Turing's family history and early childhood, continuing with his contributions to Britain's cryptanalysis and encryption efforts in World War II and culminating in Turing's conviction for homosexuality and his later suicide.

It also discusses Turing's contributions to computer science both before and after the war, omitting technical details. It contains previously unpublished material such as photographs and letters, in particular describing the nature of Turing's work in World War II between 1942 and 1945, much of which was not public knowledge beforehand. Reviews of it are mostly positive.

== History ==
Alan Turing (1912–1954) was a 20th-century mathematician and a significant early contributor to the fields of theoretical computer science and artificial intelligence. He is well known for his work on cryptanalysis of the Enigma during World War II, to help decode German military intelligence. Sir Dermot Turing is the nephew of Alan Turing and the twelfth of the Turing baronets. His father John Turing was Alan's elder brother. Whilst writing the book, Dermot Turing served as director of the Bletchley Park Trust, allowing him access to previously unpublished works.

Andrew Hodges' 1983 biography Alan Turing: The Enigma (new edition in 2012) is considered the standard reference work for Turing's life and works. Prof: Alan Turing Decoded is considerably shorter, not written in an academic style and does not cover technical details of Turing's work. Dermot Turing used The Enigma as a reference work. Other literature includes Alan M. Turing (1959, new edition in 2012), by his mother Ethel Sara Turing, and Turing: The Pioneer of the Information Age (2012) by Jack Copeland. In 2014, a movie about Turing entitled The Imitation Game had been released.

Prior to the book's release, little was known of Turing's war efforts between 1942 and 1945, after his work on code-breaking had ended. The book contains information on Turing's work on encryption of telegraph, radio and voice communication—including efforts to prevent eavesdropping on communications between UK prime minister Winston Churchill and US president Franklin D. Roosevelt. This information came from documents held by the UK government's intelligence organisation, GCHQ, which they were in the process of releasing publicly.

The book contains novel information which undermines suggestions that Turing's suicide was subject to an official cover-up. Dermot Turing found correspondence from his father indicating that Turing was having relationship issues with a man named Roy near to his death. He also published excerpts from letters Turing wrote to his friend Nick Furbank, relating to Turing's chemical castration and relationship with his mother after he was convicted for homosexuality. The book also contains previously unpublished photographs of Turing on holiday as a young boy. Dermot Turing disputed a popular perception of Alan Turing as solitary in nature. People found that Turing was difficult to understand rather than deliberately uncooperative, and though he may have been uncomfortable around new people, he was "vibrant, humorous, fun to be with and social" amongst his friends.

== Synopsis ==
The book consists of eleven chapters, in addition to an introduction and epilogue. Its title's use of the word "prof" is a reference to a nickname given to Turing by Bletchley Park colleagues, though he never held a professorship role. The first chapter, "Unreliable Ancestors", details Turing's family history, particularly their role in Colonial India and the radiology accomplishments of two of the women. "Dismal Childhoods" is about Turing's early upbringing: his mother returned to India when he was four months old, and he and his older brother John were raised by the Ward family.

The chapters "Direction of Travel" and "Kingsman" document Turing's development to adulthood, from his attendance at the boarding school Sherborne School to his studies at King's College, Cambridge, where he was elected a fellow at the age of 22. "Machinery of Logic" follows Turing's graduate study under Alonzo Church at Princeton University.

In "Prof" and "Looking Glass War", Dermot Turing writes about his uncle's role in World War II, where he worked on code-breaking for Britain at Bletchley Park and then on encrypting voice communications. The book also details the cracking of German teleprinter ciphers with the codename "fish" and the research and development of the Colossus computers. "Lousy Computer" and "Taking Shape" follow Turing's work at the National Physical Laboratory and Victoria University of Manchester, respectively. In the latter, he worked on an early stored-program computer, the Manchester Mark 1, and became interested in overlap between mathematics and biology.

The focus of "Machinery of Justice" is the legal case and consequences of Turing's conviction for sexual relations with a man. The final chapter, "Unseen Worlds", describes Turing's ideas in the areas of biology and zoology. The epilogue, titled "Alan Turing Decoded", features condolences and messages of appreciation from family members and others.

== Reception ==
Chris Christensen of Cryptologia reviewed that the book is a "good first choice" for a biography of Turing, whilst Nick Smith of Engineering & Technology praised that "no engineer's library is complete without it". Clare Mulley of History Today complimented the book's "personable" tone and "stylistic flourishes", and both Mulley and Nick Smith of Engineering & Technology wrote positively of its anecdotal style. Mulley found that it contributes towards "a more nuanced picture of the human side of Turing". In comparison to other biographies, Mulley reviewed that the book "neither ignores nor elevates the importance of [Alan Turing's] sexuality".

David H. Hamer of Cryptologia praised the work's coverage of Bletchley Park and the development of the computer. However, Christensen noted some minor inaccuracies in the book. Group theory's invention was incorrectly attributed to John von Neumann, the controversy of Bayesian statistics is exaggerated and Christensen criticised an analogy of the bombe to Turing machines as defined in Turing's On Computable Numbers. Hamer and Christensen both expressed frustration at the lack of an index, but praised the book's frequent illustrations.

== Release details ==
As well as in print, the book has been released in audiobook form, with a Chinese translation available and a special edition released for GCHQ.

- Turing, Dermot (7 September 2015). Prof: Alan Turing Decoded – Special Edition for GCHQ. The History Press. ISBN 9781841656779.
- Turing, Dermot (15 September 2015). Prof: Alan Turing Decoded. The History Press. ISBN 9781841656434.
- Turing, Dermot (4 August 2016). Prof: Alan Turing Decoded. The History Press. ISBN 9781841656601.
- Turing, Dermot (July 2017). Prof: Alan Turing Decoded (Audiobook). Brilliance Audio. ISBN 9781543623758.
- Turing, Dermot (September 2017). 解码者 : 艾伦・图灵传. Translated by 韩, 阳. China Financial and Economic Publishing House. ISBN 9787509572337.
