= Turing Foundation =

Dutch charitable organization

The Turing Foundation is a Dutch charitable organization, based in Amsterdam, The Netherlands.

The Turing Foundation, named in honour of scientist Alan Turing, was established in 2006 by Pieter Geelen, who donated the €100 million he acquired from the IPO of TomTom, a company he co-founded.

The foundation contributes roughly €3,500,000 a year to projects that:

- provide education for children in developing countries,
- protect and conserve nature,
- fight leprosy, and
- allow people to enjoy art.
