= TomTom AmiGO =

Mobile satellite navigation software

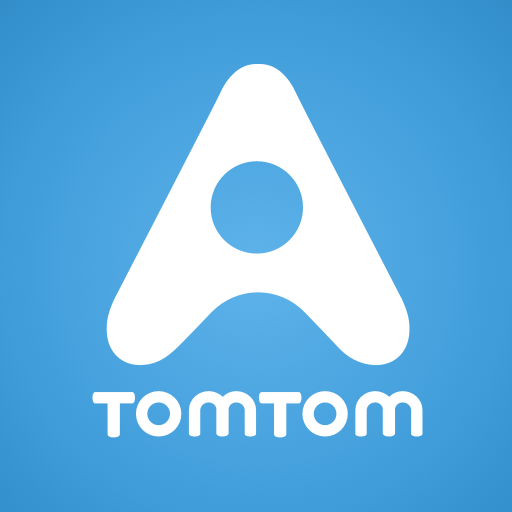
- Developer(s): TomTom International B.V.
- Initial release: 26 February 2019; 6 years ago
- Stable release: 9.886.0 / 2 January 2025; 2 months ago
- Operating system: Android, iOS

TomTom AmiGO, formerly known as TomTom Speed Cameras, is a satellite navigation software for Android and iOS mobile devices, created and operated by the Dutch company TomTom. Using GPS, it provides turn-by-turn navigation, speed camera alerts and incorporates user-submitted information. It is a community-driven initiative and is free, unlike the premium TomTom GO Navigation app offered by TomTom.

AmiGO is compatible with the Android Auto and CarPlay functionalities. The app is distributed on the Google Play Store, the App Store, and Huawei AppGallery.

The app's name is an expansion of 'go', used in other TomTom products, and the Spanish/Portuguese word for friend, 'amigo'.

== See also ==
- Comparison of satellite navigation software
