= X, Y & Z =

2018 book about the Enigma machine

- Front cover
- Author: Dermot Turing
- Subject: Enigma machine World War II
- Genre: History
- Publisher: The History Press
- Publication date: 3 September 2018
- Pages: 320 pp.
- ISBN: 9780750987820

X, Y & Z: The Real Story of How Enigma Was Broken is a 2018 book by Dermot Turing about the Enigma machine, which was used by Nazi Germany in World War II, and about the French, British, and Polish teams that worked on decrypting messages transmitted using the Enigma cipher.

The book was published in English, Polish, French, and Greek and garnered positive critical reception.

== History ==
The author, Dermot Turing, is a lawyer and nephew of Alan Turing, a cryptanalyst who was involved in cracking Enigma. Turing said of the book's topic that "at its heart is a story about people – in some cases, intriguing and eccentric people – bound up in wider events they could not themselves control". The book makes the argument that the British narrative had "pushed the role of the Polish code-breakers into the shadows".

Turing's research included files of Gustave Bertrand, a French military officer, which were declassified in 2016. It also involved communications with relatives of many of the figures covered in the book. The book also contained previously unpublished photographs, such as some held by Anna Zygalska-Cannon, niece of Polish cryptologist Henryk Zygalski.

== Synopsis ==
The title refers to the French, British and Polish teams which worked on breaking the Enigma cipher, known by shorthand as "X", "Y" and "Z", respectively. The Enigma cipher, produced by the Enigma machine, was used from the 1920s to the end of World War II by Germany—later Nazi Germany—for military and other high security communications. The Polish ambassador to London, Arkady Rzegocki, provided the book's foreword.

Poland's Marian Rejewski was able, by the end of 1932, to work out the rotor wirings of the Enigma machine, aided by documentation obtained from a spy working for France and provided to the Polish Cipher Bureau by Gustave Bertrand. Rejewski was a mathematician who used group theory, particularly the study of permutations, to calculate this information. He then worked alongside fellow-mathematicians Jerzy Różycki and Henryk Zygalski (all three, graduates of Poznań University) at decrypting intercepted German radio communications. In 1938 the Germans introduced two additional rotors to the Enigma machine. However, Rejewski invented the electromechanical "cryptologic bomba", a machine that greatly increased the efficiency of the three cryptologists' work.

In late July 1939, as the outbreak of World War II loomed, the Polish mathematicians shared their decryption techniques and equipment with British and French intelligence representatives summoned to Warsaw. After Germany invaded Poland, key Polish Cipher Bureau personnel escaped to France, and the Poles used Zygalski sheets to continue their work. Concurrently, collaborating by teletype with the Poles, the British Government Code and Cypher School (GC&CS) used the methods they had learned from the Poles. In May 1940 the Germans changed their cryptographic procedures, making the Polish methods less effective. Months later, Alan Turing, Gordon Welchman, and other British cryptologists designed and created the bombe, based on the Polish bomba, to improve their decrypting.

The German invasion of France forced the Polish team to move to more secure territories in southern France (the "Free Zone") and northern Africa. The two surviving Polish mathematician-cryptologists, Rejewski and Zygalski, via a Spanish prison and Gibraltar, arrived in Britain, where they were allowed no contact with the Ultra operation. Cipher Bureau colleagues of theirs in Poland and France were interrogated by the Germans but preserved the secret of Enigma decryption and thus of the Allied "Ultra" operation.

== Reception ==
Joanne Baker of Nature praised the book as a "remarkable tale of intellect, bravery and camaraderie that reads like a nail-biting spy novel". Baker found it a "vivid and moving account" which involved "painstaking" research by the author. Jonathan Beard of Michigan War Studies Review found the book "great" at "filling out our picture of Second World War code-breaking". Beard praised that the "prose crackles with energy and an appealing sense of humor", that there are a wealth of photographs in the book" and that an "invaluable appendix" explains part of the Polish approach to cracking Enigma.

Ralph Erskine, in Intelligence and National Security, found it "intended for general readers, who will find it informative and interesting". He noted that the book contains little new information about Enigma, but gives information about the Polish team and the political background to the cipher-breaking, and also contains some errors such as describing the Playfair cipher as a transposition cipher rather than a substitution cipher.

== Release details ==
The book was published in English, Polish, French and Greek.

- Turing, Dermot (3 September 2018). X, Y & Z: The Real Story of How Enigma Was Broken. The History Press. ISBN 9780750987820.
- Turing, Dermot (26 February 2019). X, Y, Z: Prawdziwa historia złamania szyfru Enigmy (in Polish). Translated by Szkudliński, Jan. Rebis. ISBN 9788380624559.
- Turing, Dermot (26 September 2019). Enigma: Ou comment les Alliés ont réussi à casser le code nazi (in French). Nouveau Monde. ISBN 9782369428220.
- Turing, Dermot (13 November 2019). X, Y & Z: Πώς έσπασε ο κώδικας του Enigma (in Greek). Translated by Μακρόπουλος, Μιχάλης. Κλειδάριθμος. ISBN 9789604619788.
