= Turing Robot =

Chinese technology company

Turing Robot (aka Guangnian Wuxian, 图灵机器人) is a Chinese company that develops cognitive computing technology, deep learning, and intelligent robot operating systems. The company was founded in 2010 and is based in the Haidian District of Beijing, China. Yu Zhichen is the CEO of Turing Robot.

== Background ==
Turing Robot was founded in 2010, and in 2012 released the "Wormhole Voice Assistant" application, which was the first Chinese intelligence-based voice assistant application. Its founding members were previously involved in AI research, including semantic recognition, cognitive computing, human-machine interaction, and machine learning. The company is the first Chinese company engaged in research on the commercialization of artificial intelligence (AI).

In 2014, Turing released the first open platform for AI robots, also known as the Turing Robot. In November 2015, Turing OS was released.

== Turing Robot Open Platform ==
Turing Robot Open Platform was at some point the world's largest chatbot open platform with the number of developers reached 600,000. Its Chinese semantic recognition accuracy is up to 94.7%, Turing Robot can provide intelligence-based software and hardware products with AI services covering Chinese semantic analysis, natural language and dialogue processing, DeepQA and more.

Since the official launch in November 2014, the Turing Robot has provided technical support to more than 230,000 developers and partners with over 130 billion total queries so far. The Turing Robot is used in many hardware and software fields, including domestic service robots, commercial service robots, companion robots for children, intelligent customer service systems, intelligent vehicle systems, and smart home control systems.

By simulating the cognitive and communicative behaviors of humans, the Turing Robot provides users with a conversation feature that provides intelligence-based interaction in hardware and software products, as well as the NLP Knowledge Base for customized life and business needs. Meanwhile, the Turing Robot offers a package of 500 types of life service skills to accommodate product needs.

The Turing Robot comprehensively integrates over 500 kinds of life information and service skills into software and hardware products. Enquiries can be made about recipes, weather, delivery services, among other things.

=== Customized features of the Turing Robot ===
Features of the Turing Robot include personalized settings, keyword filtering, robot training, accuracy rate setting, and data statistics.

=== Application scenarios ===
Application cases for the Turing Robot could include smart robots, toys, vehicle systems, QQ robots, smart home, and smart custom service.

== Turing OS ==
Turing OS is an intelligent robot operating system whose design is based on simulating the thinking mode and emotional recognition of humans, which provides natural and friendly multi-mode human-machine interaction methods. It includes a thinking enhancement engine, an affective computing engine and a self-learning engine.

=== Multimodal interactions ===
Turing OS introduces new multi-modal interaction for robots that is closer to human capability that prior technology. With Turing OS installed, robots can understand voice, text, images, body movement, and other multi-modal data from external sources such as humans. Meanwhile, they can provide simultaneous feedback, including through voice, text, and images.

=== Three engines ===
==== Affective Computing Engine ====
The Affective Computing Engine of Turing OS enables robots to have the same ability to demonstrate affection as humans. The Turing OS develops a mature affective computing engine for robots, which assists robots in understanding and expressing human emotions. The affective computing engine of the Turing OS has two components: human emotion recognition and human-like emotion expression.

==== Cognitive Enhancement Engine ====
The Cognitive Enhancement Engine of Turing OS enables robots to have the same thinking ability as humans. Based on research into human macro-thinking models and micro-thinking models, the Turing OS provides powerful thinking for robots, and enables robots to operate in multiple macro- and micro-thinking modes. Macro-thinking is characterized by larger, observable events while micro-thinking is characterized by smaller, more thoughtful/personal moments. Robots with the Turing OS attain the thinking level of children aged four to five.

The Cognitive Enhancement Engine includes 26 types of macro thinking and 10,140 types of micro thinking.

=== Application services ===
Turing OS provides application services, covering 25 applicable scenarios, including: English learning, family entertainment, knowledge learning, and operations control.

=== Turing OS v1.5 ===
On The First Innovation Conference of Turing Robot, CEO of Turing Robot, Yu Zhichen released an updated version of Turing OS: Turing OS Version 1.5, with an added visual ability to its former edition.

==== Turing Robot Application Project ====
Turing Robot Application Project was also released on the Innovation Conference of Turing Robot, it includes official applications like Robots' Chatting, Automatic Camera, Robots Singing and English Read-after. Besides that, the platform is free and open to developers to build their own apps on and Weather Report, Dictionary and Music Playlist were taken for a start.

== Applications ==
The following applications for Turing Robot and Turing OS exist.

=== Turing Robot ===
- BOSCH Vehicle System
- HTC Voice: Little Hi
- China Telecom Customer Service
- Letou Carl Vehicle System
- JIMI Cat APP
- Kido Smart Watch

=== Turing OS ===
- Super Wings Robot
- Doraemon
- Robotant
- Hahabot
- Luobotec
- Albert Robot
- Tuba Robot

== See also ==
- List of things named after Alan Turing
- List of artificial intelligence companies
- List of robotics software
