= Webfleet =

Fleet management company

- Type: Subsidiary
- Industry: Fleet management, Telematics
- Founded: 1999
- Founder: Thomas Schmidt; Thomas Becher
- Headquarters: Amsterdam, Netherlands
- Area served: Worldwide
- Key people: Jan-Maarten De Vries (President, Fleet Management Solutions)
- Number of employees: 1,000+
- Parent: Bridgestone
- Website: www.webfleet.com

Webfleet is a fleet management and vehicle telematics company. Originally established as Datafactory, the start-up developed one of the first web-based fleet management solutions under the name Webfleet. The company later became part of TomTom and, since 2019, operates under Bridgestone as a providing fleet management and related digital services.

== History ==
Webfleet was founded in 1999 as Datafactory in Leipzig, Germany. Its founders, Thomas Schmidt and Thomas Becher, developed one of the early web-based fleet management platforms, branded Webfleet.

In 2005, TomTom acquired Datafactory. Under TomTom's ownership, the business expanded across Europe and other international markets. By 2018, the telematics division reported revenues of €174 million and a net result of €48 million.

In 2007, the company introduced connected navigation services, integrating live data connectivity into fleet operations. From 2015 onward, it expanded its services to include vehicle data analytics focused on fuel management, eco-driving, and operational efficiency.

In 2019, Bridgestone EMEA acquired TomTom Telematics for approximately €910 million. Following the acquisition, the business was renamed Webfleet Solutions, and later simplified to Webfleet. In 2020, Bridgestone identified Webfleet as one of its core mobility products businesses, and appointed Jan-Maarten De Vries as chief executive of Bridgestone Mobility Solutions.

In 2023, Bridgestone partnered with the Dutch NGO Justdiggit, a partner of the United Nations Environment Programme, to support the re-greening of 15,378 hectares of land in Tanzania.

In 2020, Webfleet won the German Telematik Award for its electric vehicle (EV) telematics features. In 2021, the company received the Frost & Sullivan award for European Commercial Fleet Telematics Company of the Year, a designation that was renewed in 2025.

In July 2024, Webfleet set a Guinness World Record by sponsoring a Ford Mustang Mach-E that traveled 916.74 km on one charge. Supported by Bridgestone and the AA, the production EV beat the previous Chinese record by six miles, continuing for 21 miles after the battery reached 0%.

== Activities ==
Webfleet operates in Australia, the Americas, Europe and South Africa. It provides subscription-based fleet management and telematics services, including vehicle tracking, connected navigation, data analytics, fuel management, and tyre-related services.

As of 2025, the company serves around 50,000 customers, with vehicles monitored in over 150 countries. Its platform tracks daily distances of over 130 million kilometers and more than 3.2 million hours of driving. Webfleet also monitors fuel consumption and carbon dioxide emissions for its clients. Industry analysts at Berg Insight have ranked Webfleet as the second-largest provider of fleet management solutions in Europe, with an installed base of about 735,000 units at the end of 2023.
