= TomTom =

Dutch manufacturer of automotive navigation systems

TomTom N.V.
- Logo used since 2022

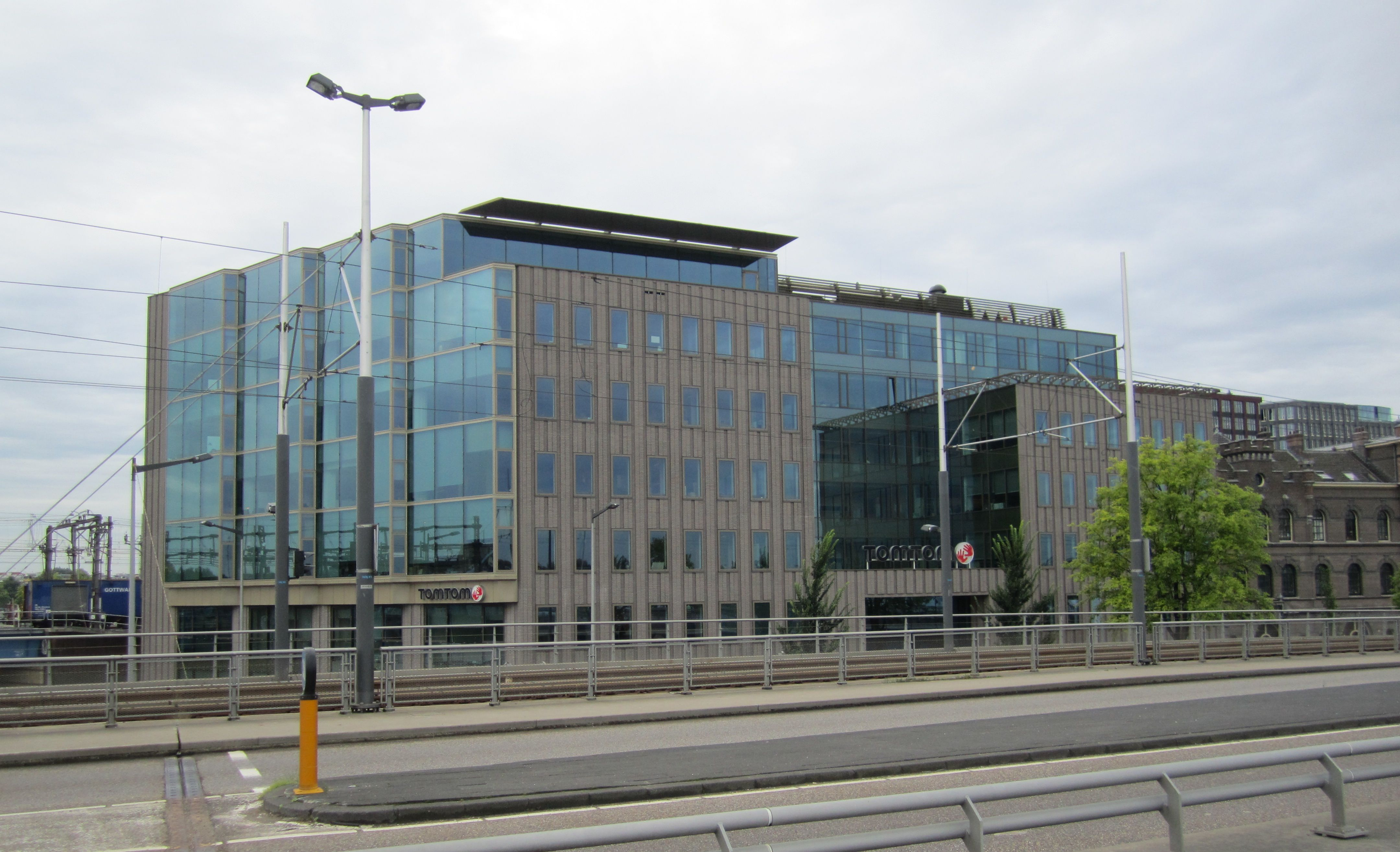
- Headquarters in Amsterdam
- Formerly: Palmtop B.V. (until 2003)
- Type: Naamloze vennootschap
- Traded as: Euronext Amsterdam: TOM2
- Industry: Consumer electronics, navigation technology
- Founded: 1991; 35 years ago
- Founder: Harold Goddijn; Corinne Vigreux; Peter-Frans Pauwels; Pieter Geelen
- Headquarters: De Ruijterkade 154, 1011 AC, Amsterdam, Netherlands
- Key people: Harold Goddijn (CEO), Corinne Vigreux (CMO and co-founder), Taco Titulaer (CFO), Derk Haank (chairman of the supervisory board), Alain De Taeye (management board)
- Products: devices, digital map, software and services
- Revenue: ▼€ 701 million (2019)
- Operating income: ▼€56 million (2018)
- Net income: ▼€45 million (2018)
- Total assets: ▼€1.5 billion (2018)
- Total equity: ▲€774 million (2018)
- Number of employees: 4,500 (end of 2019)
- Website: www.tomtom.com

TomTom N.V. is a Dutch multinational developer and creator of location technology and consumer electronics. Founded in 1991 and headquartered in Amsterdam, TomTom released its first generation of satellite navigation devices to market in 2004. As of 2019, the company has over 4,500 employees worldwide and operations in 29 countries throughout Europe, Asia-Pacific, and the Americas.

== History ==
The company was founded in Amsterdam in 1991 as Palmtop Software, by Corinne Vigreux, Peter-Frans Pauwels and Pieter Geelen. The company focused on corporate handheld device software before focusing on the consumer market and releasing the first route planning software for mobile devices in 1996. Software was developed mainly for Psion devices and the company was one of the largest developers of Psion software in the late 1990s. Palmtop also worked with Psion in the development of EPOC32. Software was also developed for Palm and Windows CE devices.

In 1999, Vigreux's husband, Harold Goddijn left Psion Netherlands, for which TomTom made software and where Vigreux was previously sales director, to join TomTom. He had previously invested in TomTom. In 2001, the company's brand name changed to TomTom, while its legal name was also changed by 2003.

On 27 May 2005, TomTom listed on the Amsterdam Stock Exchange, valuing the company at nearly €50 million.

In September 2005, TomTom acquired Datafactory AG, a telematics service provider based in Leipzig. Datafactory AG employed around 30 people and realized a turnover of approximately €5 million in 2004 and a small net profit.

In January 2006, TomTom acquired the UK company Applied Generics, forming TomTom Traffic.

In 2008, TomTom acquired Tele Atlas, a digital map maker, for €2.9 billion.

In 2010, they produced an advert saying, "You are not stuck in traffic. You are traffic". A photograph of this was widely circulated on the internet. It became a meme, often with different images and sometimes reworded slightly.

On 11 June 2012, at an event for Apple's iOS 6 preview, TomTom was announced as the main mapping data provider for Apple's revamped iOS 6 "Maps" app, replacing Google Maps.

In 2014, TomTom partnered with Volkswagen Group for joint research on Highly Automated Driving (HAD) systems.

TomTom signed deals to provide its navigation devices to several carmakers including Volkswagen Group, Daimler, Toyota and others.

In late 2015, TomTom extended its deal with Apple and signed a new contract with Uber, in which the Uber driver app uses TomTom maps and traffic data in 300 cities worldwide. In May 2018, TomTom launched new a portable navigation device, the TomTom Go Camper, to cater to the requirements of caravan and motorhome users.

In January 2018, the company faced criticism for announcing that it would no longer be providing map updates for some devices. It also said that "lifetime" meant the "useful life" of a device.

In 2020, the company signed a deal with Chinese manufacturer Huawei to use TomTom's map data in Petal Maps, a replacement service to Google Maps for the company's smartphones.

In June 2025, TomTom announced plans to eliminate around 300 positions (roughly 8–10%) of its global workforce as part of a strategic reorganization to “realign its organisation and embrace artificial intelligence.” The layoffs impacted roles in the application layer, sales, and support divisions. At the time, the company employed approximately 3,600 people worldwide.

=== Product history ===
Until 1996, TomTom developed business-to-business applications such as meter reading and bar-code reading for handheld devices, such as Palm Pilot, Compaq iPaq and Psion Series 5. Subsequently, the company moved its focus to PDA software for the consumer market. Early mapping software included EnRoute, Citymaps and Routeplanner.

By 2001, it released the first car satellite navigation software, the TomTom Navigator, shifting the company's focus to GPS car navigation. In 2004, a built-in subscription-based traffic update service was added.

The first all-in-one device personal navigation device, the TomTom Go was released in March 2004, creating a new consumer electronics category. TomTom reports it has sold about 250,000 units of TomTom Go and this product represented 60% of the company's revenue for 2004. As of 2016, the company had sold nearly 80 million navigation devices worldwide.

In 2005, the ability to download new voices was introduced. The ruggedized, water-resistant Rider navigation device was released for motorcycle users in 2006. The Rider was the first portable satellite navigation device designed for motorcycles and scooters.

Text-to-speech for road names was first introduced in 2006, along with hands-free calling and traffic support. TomTom Home, software for managing and downloading content for TomTom on a PC, was first released at this time.

TomTom partnered with Vodafone in 2007 to create a high definition traffic service, designed to deliver real-time traffic data to Vodafone users through their devices.

New features introduced in 2008 included IQ Routes, which estimated journey times based on average recorded speeds, rather than speed limits, and "Advanced Lane Guidance", an on-screen representation of the correct lane to take.

In the autumn of 2008, devices were introduced with built-in GSM SIM cards, for connected features including HD Traffic, Google Local Search, real-time speed camera updates, and the facility to search for the cheapest fuel on route.

In 2013, TomTom entered the GPS sports watch market with the launch of the TomTom Runner and TomTom Multi-Sport GPS. TomTom extended its range of GPS sports watches with the launch of the Runner Cardio GPS in 2014 with a built-in heart rate monitor.

In 2015, TomTom entered a new product category with the launch of its new action camera, the Bandit. It had a built-in media server, enabling users to share footage in a matter of minutes.

TomTom launched a new sports watch in 2016, the TomTom Spark, which in addition to GPS and a heart-rate monitor, included music on the wrist and a 24/7 activity tracker.

A year later, the company announced that it was reorganizing the sports division and was withdrawing from the consumer sports market, although products would continue to be supported. A company press release in June 2023 announced that support for sports watches and other wearable products will be discontinued from September 2023. This includes TomTom's own platforms as well as integration with third-party services such as Strava.

In 2018, TomTom became the primary supplier of data for Apple's map app.

== TomTom Group business structure ==
TomTom's business model targets two major market segments: B2B and Enterprise.

=== Location technology ===
Location technology comprises the company's automotive and enterprise businesses, providing maps and navigation software as components of customer applications.

The firm's automotive segment sells location technology components to carmakers. TomTom's navigation software is integrated into vehicles to provide current map data, online routing, and guidance and search information, allowing for vehicle features like destination prediction, traffic expectations, or charging points location and availability for electric vehicles.

TomTom's enterprise segment sells its location technologies to tech companies, government bodies, and traffic management entities.

=== Consumer ===
The consumer segment of TomTom's business sells portable, personal satellite navigation devices, once its core profit center. Usage of standalone GPS devices has since declined, despite the brand's efforts to contrast features to those of smartphone integrated alternatives. Recently, the company has transitioned its consumer business away from devices to offer software applications instead with digital maplinked services. This shift in focus is due partially to declining profitability as consumers utilize GPS alternatives with integrated navigation apps, and also to the anticipated rise in autonomous vehicle usage.

== Products and services ==
TomTom as a company offers three types of products in different shapes and forms: maps, connected services and (navigation) software. TomTom Navigation devices (PNDs) and TomTom GO navigation apps are sold directly or indirectly to end-consumers. In-dashboard systems are released for the automotive market. The navigation devices and portable devices with installed software are referred to as units.

TomTom partners with several car manufacturers and offers built-in navigation devices.

Product	Car manufacturer
Uconnect	Fiat
Blue&Me TomTom	Fiat, Alfa Romeo, Lancia
Renault R-Link	Renault
Carminat TomTom	Renault
Lexus CT MoveOn Navi	Lexus
Mazda Navigation System	Mazda
Toyota Touch 2 with Go	Toyota
Online Traffic Service	Volkswagen
Peugeot i-Cockpit	PSA
Connect 3D Nav	FCA
Gen3,4,5 & 6	Subaru
Gen 2	Mercury
SmartMediaConnect	Smart

=== Navigation ===
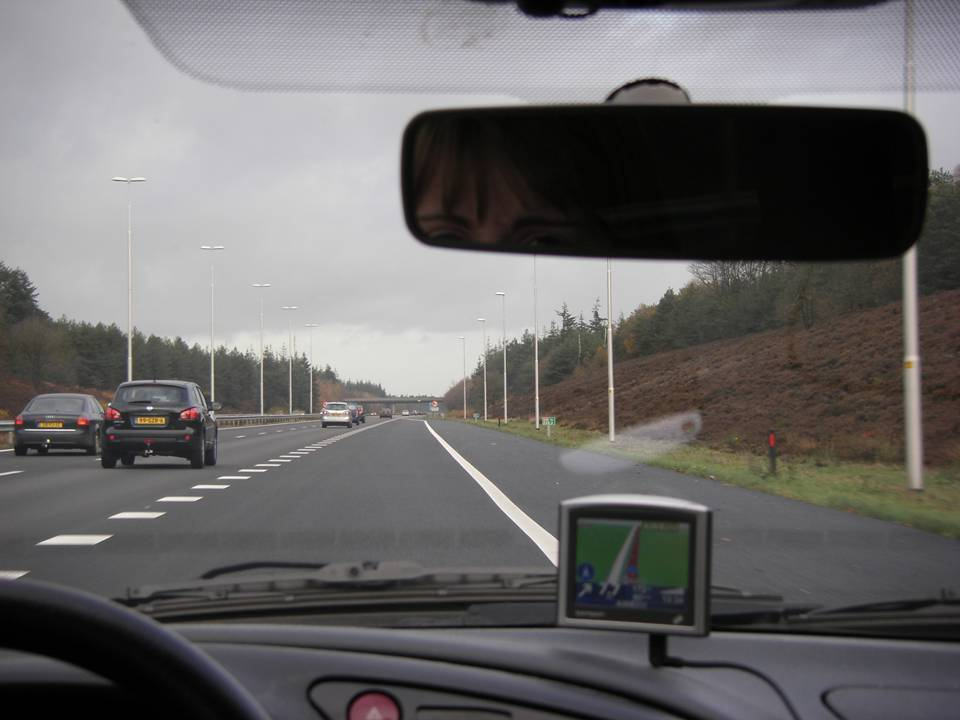
A TomTom One in use

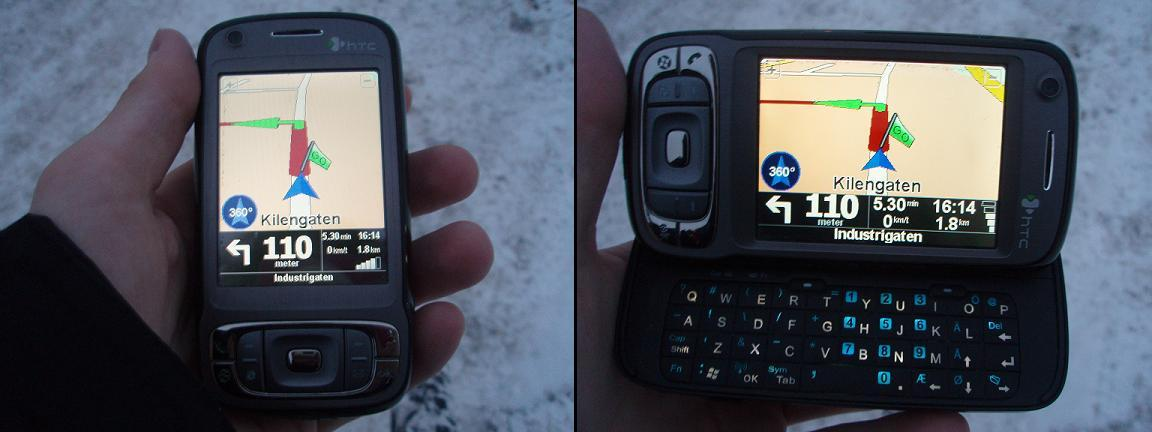
TomTom Navigator 7 running on a HTC TyTN II (Windows Mobile)

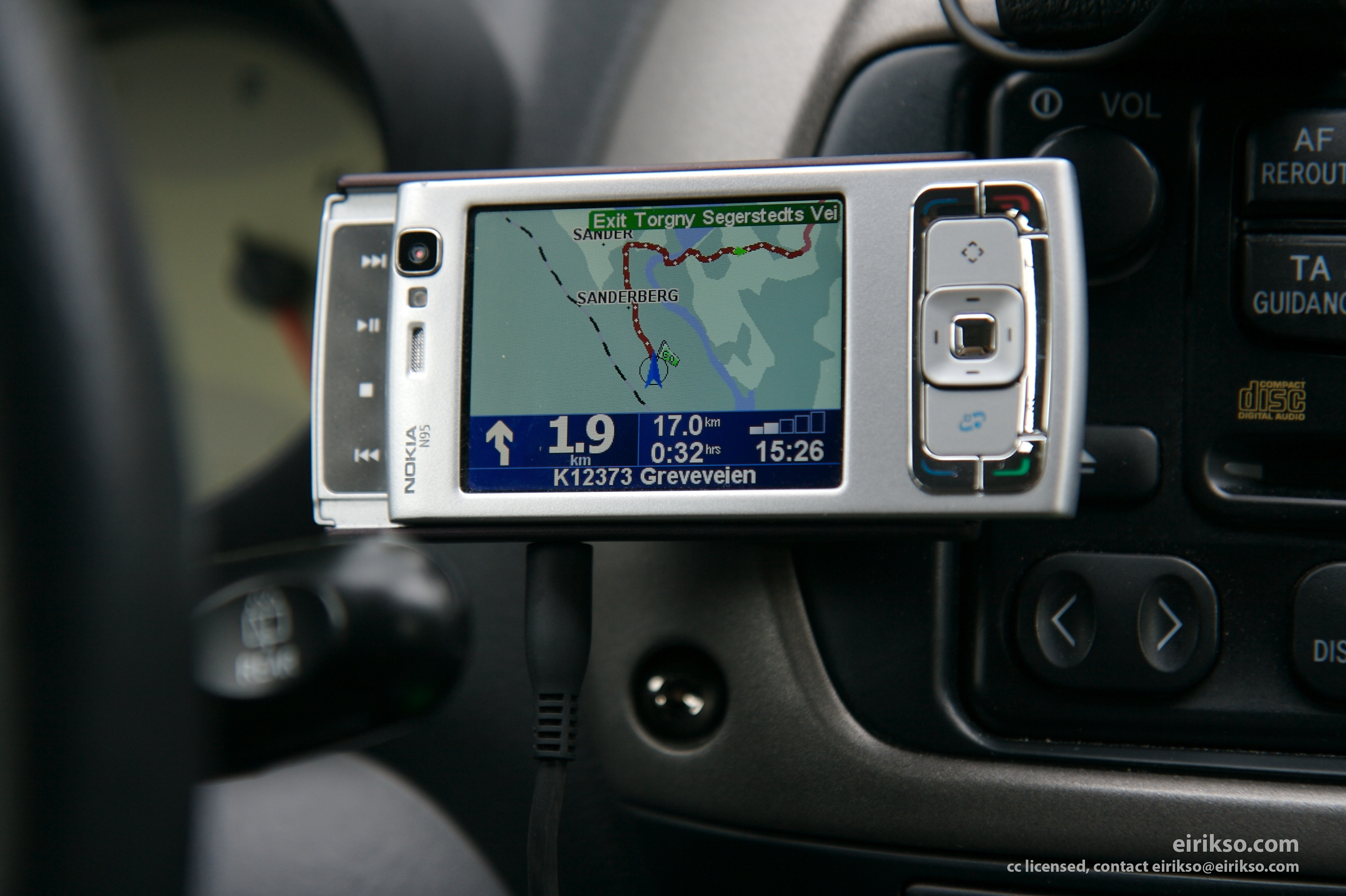
TomTom Navigator running on a Nokia N95 (Symbian)

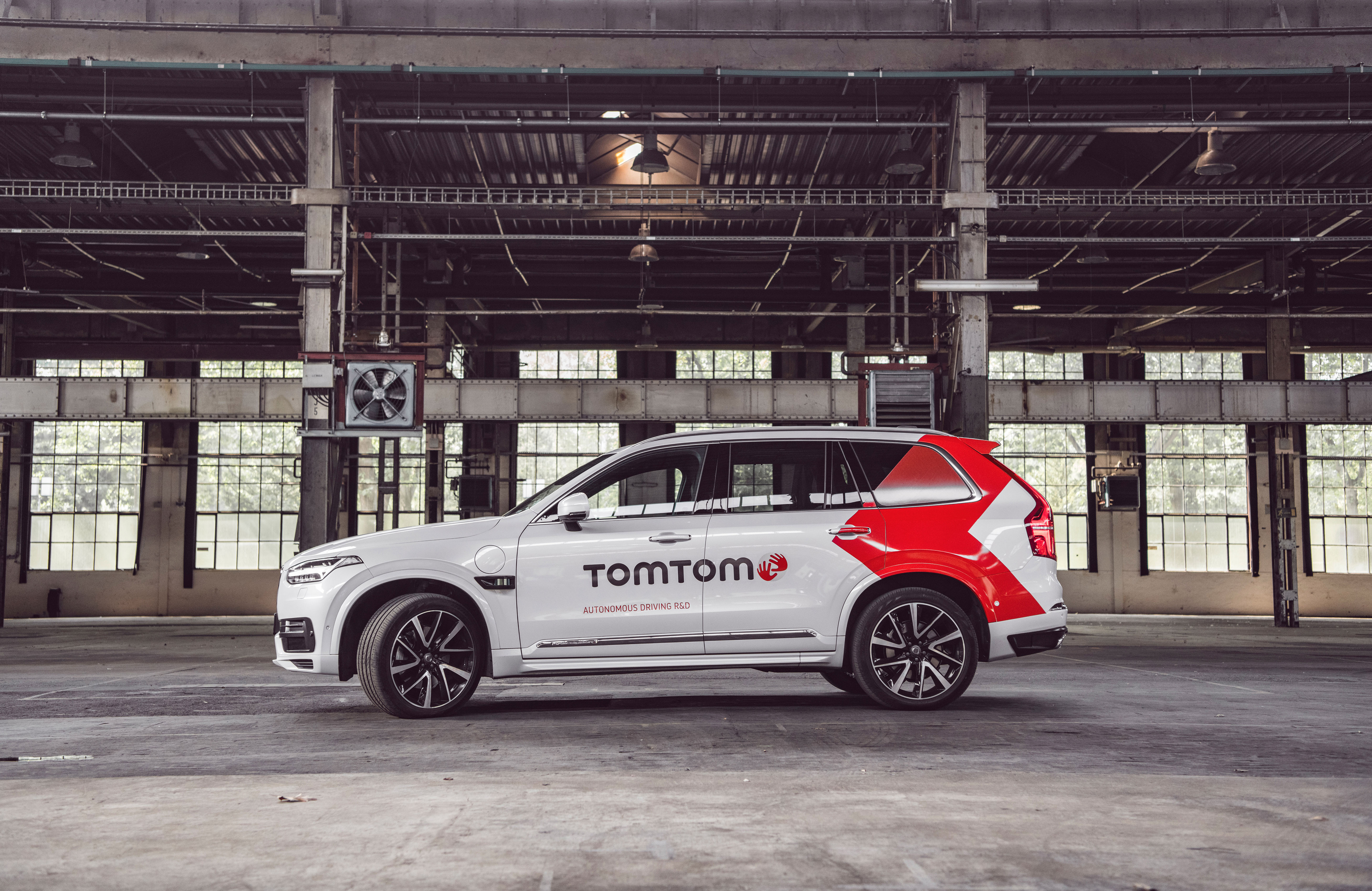
TomTom Self Driving Test Vehicle

TomTom units provide a flying interface with an oblique bird's-eye view of the road, as well as a direct-overhead map view. They use a GPS receiver to show the precise location and provide visual and spoken directions on how to drive to the specified destination. Some TomTom systems also integrate with mobile phones using Bluetooth, traffic congestion maps or to actually take calls and read SMS messages aloud.

==== Navigation devices ====
TomTom's all-in-one GPS navigation devices come with a touch screen, speaker, USB port, and an internal lithium-ion battery. Most models have Bluetooth transceivers that allow connection to a smartphone, enabling the device to be used as a speakerphone to make and receive hands-free calls.

- TomTom Go, Via and Start – general purpose navigation devices.
- TomTom Camper & Caravan / RV – these models have a map that is supplied with height and width restrictions, which allows vehicle size and weight data to be entered for the route planning.
- TomTom Truck – designed for professional truck drivers and include truck-specific software and maps.
- TomTom Rider – Portable water-resistant models for motorcycle and motorscooter users. They differ from other devices in that the Rider is partly shielded and has a 'glove-friendly' screen and GUI.
- TomTom One and One XL – The TomTom One is the base model for automobile navigation. The difference between the TomTom One XL and the TomTom One is the size of the touch screen (4.3 vs 3.5 in or 110 vs 89 mm). Neither model of the One contains the added functions included in the Go models, such as Bluetooth hands-free calling and MP3 jukebox. However, the One is able to receive traffic and weather updates using the TomTom Plus service when paired via Bluetooth with a mobile phone with a DUN data service. The reduced software capability means less demand on the hardware, which allows the One to be sold at a significantly lower price than the Go. The XL is also available as a Live version with integrated Live Services.
- Tom – In October 2025, TomTom launched Tom, a hands-free driving assistant that integrates with the TomTom App, providing real-time alerts for speed cameras, obstacles, and traffic conditions without requiring a subscription. Designed to enhance safety and convenience, Tom delivers distraction-free notifications through a combination of visual alerts via an LED ring and audible alerts through a buzzer, ensuring drivers do not miss important road information. Users can use Tom’s buttons to report, confirm, or dismiss speed cameras and hazards, helping keep TomTom’s map data accurate and up to date for all drivers. The product utilizes TomTom’s mapping and navigation data while following strict data protection standards to safeguard user privacy.

==== Navigation software ====
Current

- TomTom GO Expert (formerly TomTom GO Mobile), GPS navigation software for the Android and iOS operating system. It replaced the old app, which had similar features to the iOS app. In March 2015, TomTom announced the new TomTom Go Mobile app for Android with a freemium subscription model for maps, with the first 50 miles/75 kilometres per month being free, including all the maps that are available, TomTom Traffic and Speed Cameras. The previous app, which had promised "free lifetime updates", is not available for purchase on the Play Store anymore, and its maps have not been updated since October 2015. TomTom claims its definition of lifetime map updates is "the period of time that TomTom continues to support the app with updates". Previous customers of TomTom's Android navigation app are offered a discount on the subscription in the new app for three years. There is no provision for users who want to keep using the old app under the conditions it was sold with lifetime map updates.
- TomTom AmiGO (formerly TomTom Speed Cameras), a mobile software application released in 2015 free of charge. It provides turn-by-turn navigation, speed camera alerts and incorporates user-submitted information. It is a community-driven initiative and is free, unlike the premium TomTom GO Navigation app offered by TomTom.

Former

- TomTom Navigator – a GPS navigation software product for personal digital assistants (PDAs), Palm devices, Pocket PCs, and some smartphones. TomTom Navigator 6 replaced the earlier TomTom Mobile 5.2. It can use GPS receivers built into the device or external (e.g., Bluetooth-connected) receivers. Navigator 7 was the latest release of this software, released as a part of the software that came with the June 2008 HTC Touch Diamond. Frequently used functions can be added to the main screen of the program, and users can report map corrections and share them with other users. Navigator supports touch screens; devices without touch screens use a cursor to input data. The software is available on SD card and DVD. It runs on a number of devices listed on the TomTom website, but will run successfully on many unlisted devices using the Windows Mobile operating system, discontinued in 2010. The DVD version includes a DVD, printed 15-character product code, Quick Start Guide, Licensing Agreement, a poster with a picture diagram for setup procedure of DVD version and SD card version, and an advertisement for associated TomTom Plus services. The DVD contains installation software for TomTom Home, software for mobile devices, licenses, manuals, maps, and voices. The software for mobile devices includes CAB files for Palm, PPC, Symbian, and UIQ3.
- TomTom for iOS – GPS navigation software product for iOS devices, originally announced for the iPhone at the Apple WWDC Keynote speech in early June 2009, and released internationally on 15 August 2009 in the Apple App Store, with various map packs for different regions. TomTom Vice President of Marketing Development gave information in an interview by Macworld in July 2009. Currently the app works with iPhone (all models), the iPod Touch (all models) and the iPad (all models), however Apple dropped the support for the early models and latest versions of the TomTom iOS app might have issues on certain devices. There are two separate TomTom car kits available for certain Apple devices. The current maps available in each countries' app stores varies according to language availability of the app itself, the country of the app store, and thus differing region group map packs are available. Turkey and Greece were not included in the larger Europe map pack; this is related to the AppStore's app size limitation of 2 GB. These maps are available separately. Iceland is not available in any map package sold by TomTom at the moment, but it is working on it (and a few other countries too). Also most likely there will be a new iOS app available, based on the NavKit, which might cure the issue with the size limit (also Apple increased the app size limit to 4 GB).

Navigation software for several mobile phones was discontinued after release 5.2; Navigator, which does not support all the phones that Mobile did, is the nearest equivalent. Mobile 5.2 cannot use maps later than v6.60 build 1223; this and earlier program versions are not compatible with all map versions, particularly other builds of version 6.

In September 2012, Apple collaborated with TomTom to provide mapping data for its revamped iOS 6 updated Apple Maps app. The partnership was in part due to Apple's decision to wean itself off the products of its competitor, Google. As of 2018 TomTom continues to provide data for Apple Maps.

=== Support applications ===
TomTom Home (stylized as TomTom HOME) is a 32-bit PC application that allows synchronization/updates to be sent to the mobile device. TomTom Home version 2.0 and above is implemented on the XULRunner platform. With version 2.2, TomTom Home added a content-sharing platform where users can download and upload content to personalize their device such as voices, start-up images, POI sets, etc. At the moment TomTom Home is on version 2.9.

Despite being based on the cross-platform XULRunner, TomTom Home lacks support for Linux. It is, for instance, impossible to update the maps in these devices by connecting them to another machine running Linux, even when using a common web browser like Firefox that normally allowed such an update under Microsoft Windows. However, the devices can still be read in a Linux OS as a disk drive. There is even software made by the community to manage some functions of the TomTom.

The NAV3 and NAV4 range of models use MyDrive Connect. MyDrive Connect is compatible with 32bit and 64bit versions of Windows XP/Vista/7/8/8.1/10 preview and with most Mac OS X versions. The internal flash memory or the memory card content of the device cannot be accessed through USB for security reasons (modified applications would easily accept a map that wasn't sold by TomTom). The device can update itself by getting files through the HTTP protocol over USB. The support app is nothing more than a proxy on the PC buffering the download. So far the security achieved using this mechanism has not been broken yet. Also, the usage of the non-FAT/FAT32 file system brought stability improvements in device operations.

=== Traffic services ===
A traffic monitoring service that uses multiple sources to provide traffic information. The service does this by combining data from:

- traditional sources: governmental/third-party data such as induction loops in the roads, cameras and traffic surveillance
- new sources: traffic flow of millions of anonymous mobile phone users

The information is merged by TomTom and algorithms are used to improve the data and filter out anomalous readings. The system sends updates to all TomTom Traffic users every two minutes (and the data the users receive is never older than 30 seconds). Users can receive the service through the built-in SIM, via a smartphone connection or on older devices via a standard phone connection. Re-routing can be set to be transparent to the user with the only sign that the route has been changed due to a traffic jam being a sound indication from the device and a changed ETA.

The system was first launched in the Netherlands in 2007 and expanded to the United Kingdom, France, Germany and Switzerland in 2008. By mid-2011, TomTom Live services including TomTom Traffic were available in the United States, South Africa, New Zealand and seventeen European countries: Austria, Belgium, Denmark, Finland, France, Germany, Ireland, Italy, Luxembourg, Netherlands, Norway, Poland, Portugal, Spain, Sweden, Switzerland and the United Kingdom. As of 2015, the service is vastly expanded and current coverage is available on the TomTom Traffic site (34 countries as of 26 June 2015 and the list expands every few months to new regions).

- HD Traffic 6.0 (August 2012): More accurate location of traffic jams, improved coverage of automatically detected road closures
- TomTom Traffic 7.0 (September 2013): Increased accuracy of jam location now allows for 'Jam Ahead Warnings', warning drivers when approaching a jam-tail too fast. Improved coverage of automatic road closure detection started to include also major secondary roads. Automatic road works detection on highways. TomTom also added 'Predictive Flow Feed' for better predicting approaching traffic delays, with the goal of improving optimal route calculation and ETA.
- TomTom Traffic 8.0 (November 2014): TomTom included real-time weather information in its routing algorithms, and warns users in areas of bad weather. Also, version 8.0 now incorporates in its real-time traffic information road closures that are reported via the online Map Share Reporter tool.

=== Consumer ===
The company offers fee-based services under the name TomTom Plus (stylized TomTom PLUS), which include services to warn drivers about speed cameras, provide weather updates, change voices and provide traffic alerts. Currently, the fees are only for European countries.

Traffic data is also available to subscribers in many parts of Europe and the US via a Bluetooth-enabled cell phone with Internet service or an add-on aerial, which picks up RDS data (broadcast on FM radio frequencies) offering traffic information without the requirement for a data connection. The TomTom Plus service is not compatible with Apple's iPhone.

In October 2008 the company released Live Services on the Go 940 Live. These allowed users to receive updates over the mobile telephone network using the SIM card in the device. These services included HD Traffic, Safety Alerts, Local Search with Google and Fuel Prices.

On 12 May 2011, TomTom announced that it was offering up its real-time traffic products to "industry partners" in the United States.

On the latest NAV4 devices the service is not available anymore in the old form. The included services had been separated and now being called TomTom Traffic and Speed Cameras. On the x0/x00/x000 devices the traffic service is free of charge either via the built-in SIM (Always Connected models) or via a compatible smartphone (smartphone-connected or BYOD – bring-your-own-device). The speed camera service is free for three months on these models. However, there is a newer range, the x10/x100 models, which come now with free lifetime speed camera subscription too.

Map Share is a proprietary map technology launched by TomTom in June 2007. Map Share allows users to make changes to the maps on their navigation devices and share them with others. It allows drivers to make changes to their maps directly on their navigation devices. Drivers can block or unblock streets, change the direction of traffic, edit street names and add, edit or remove points of interest (POIs). Improvements can be shared with other users through TomTom Home, TomTom's content management software.

An online version called Map Share Reporter is on the TomTom website.

IQ Routes, developed by TomTom and available since spring 2008 on the TomTom Go 730 and Go 930, uses anonymous travel time data accumulated by users of TomTom satnav devices. Newer TomTom devices use this data to take into account the time and day when determining the fastest route.

Travel time data is stored in Historical Speed Profiles, one for each road segment, covering large motorways, main roads and also small local roads. Historic Speed Profiles are part of the digital map and are updated with every new map release. They give insight into real-world traffic patterns. This is a fact-based routing system based on measured travel times, compared to most other methods which use speed limits or 'assumed' speeds.

In September 2008, map upgrade v8.10 was released for x20 series models, extending the IQ Routes feature to those devices with a free software update using TomTom Home.

On the NAV3 and NAV4 models the IQ Routes feature is available by default on all map versions.

== Mapping ==
TomTom worked with auto parts manufacturer Bosch, starting in 2015, to develop maps for use in self-driving vehicles. Bosch defined the specifications for TomTom maps to follow as it began first road-tests on U.S. highway I-280 and Germany's A81. TomTom commented at the time on the contrast in details required in those newly developed maps compared with earlier versions, specifically including "precision to the decimeter" and other complex data required to help a self-driving car "see" key road features as it travels. In 2015, TomTom was one of the only independent producers of digital maps that remained in the marketplace as it partnered with brands like Volkswagen to provide maps in the auto industry. The company also partnered with Uber in 2015, and extended the partnership further in 2020. Together the companies have worked to integrate TomTom maps and traffic data across the ridesharing app's platform. This lets Uber serve as a "trusted map editing partner", making it one of the first brands to join TomTom's Map Editing Partnership (MEP) program.

As part of the MEP program, users provide feedback on road conditions as they encounter them so that live maps can be updated to reflect current conditions. The program estimates 3 million edits monthly by its partners globally. Apple has relied on licensed data from TomTom and others to fill in data gaps in its Maps app since launching it in 2012. In January 2020 Apple confirmed that it was no longer licensing data from TomTom and would rely on its own underlying Maps app framework going forward after a recent app update at the time. As of 2019, TomTom claimed to have 800 million people using its products across physical hardware and apps using TomTom technology. The same year, TomTom sold its fleet management division, TomTom Telematics, to Japanese Bridgestone to prioritize business linked to its digital maps, as the brand shifted focus away from consumer devices to software services instead. In 2019, TomTom Telematics became Webfleet Solutions. The brand leveraged its real-time driving and parking data in collaboration with Microsoft and Moovit (a public transport data platform)in 2019, as well as struck map and navigation deals with auto industry tycoons like Nissan, Fiat Chrysler, Porsche, Lamborghini, and Bentley among others. Teaming up with the University of Amsterdam, the partners launched Atlas Lab, a research lab dedicated to AI development to support HD maps to be used in autonomous vehicles. TomTom has also been developing High Definition (HD) maps intended for use in autonomous cars to assist with environmental data where sensors are limited. The company announced in March 2019 that it would supply HD maps to "multiple top 10" auto manufacturers that would provide centimeter accuracy in representing terrain; and announced a new "map horizon" feature, allowing self-driving cars to simulate a virtual picture of the road ahead in real-time. The company partnered with Volvo the same year (2019) to build its own vehicle capable of "level 5" autonomy in hopes of further improving its maps technology. The Volvo XC90 included custom sensing equipment to provide data about the vehicle's surroundings that could be referenced against TomTom's HD maps. TomTom crowdsourced camera data through its partnership with Hella Aglaia, announced in September 2019, to feed into its real-time map updates for ongoing improvement to the new HD maps technology.

In early 2020, TomTom publicly announced the recent closing of a deal with Huawei Technologies where Huawei would use TomTom's maps, data, and navigation tools to develop its own apps for use in Chinese smartphones.

Tomtom participates in OpenStreetMap contributes and uses map data from the service. Tomtom's vice president of community is a founder of OpenStreetMap.

TomTom has collected a range of live and historical data since 2008, analysing data from a variety of sources including connected devices and its community of users. Additionally, TomTom's "MoMa" vehicles (short for mobile mapping) cover over 3 billion km annually, using both radar and LiDAR cameras to capture 375 million images annually to sense road changes that are then verified and used to update its maps. TomTom pairs this data with input from partnering brands to process around 2 billion map changes on average each month to keep maps current and reflective of existing road conditions. The brand puts out an updated map database commercially on a weekly basis.

== Controversy ==
In April 2011, TomTom "apologized for supplying driving data collected from customers to police to use in catching speeding motorists". The company had collected data from its Dutch customers which Dutch police subsequently used to set targeted speed traps. As a result of this, TomTom was investigated by the Dutch Data Protection Authority, who found that TomTom had not contravened the Dutch Data Protection Act.

In 2011, TomTom improved the clarity of its explanation of how it uses the data it collects from its customers.

In May 2011, the company announced that it was planning to sell aggregated customer information to the Roads & Traffic Authority of the Australian state of New South Wales, which could also potentially be used for targeted speed enforcement.

The privacy implications of this announcement were widely reported, particularly the lack of anonymity and the potential to associate the data with individuals. The company's practice of selling its user data has been criticised by Electronic Frontiers Australia. David Vaile of the University of New South Wales' Cyberspace Law and Policy Centre has called for an independent technical analysis of the company's data collection practices. TomTom navigation devices collect user data that includes point of origin, point of destination, journey times, speeds and routes taken. The Australian Privacy Foundation said it would be easy to trace the data back to individual customers, even if TomTom claimed it used only aggregated, anonymous data.

TomTom VP of Marketing Chris Kearney insisted the information was totally anonymous. In addition to this, he said TomTom never sold the information to Dutch authorities with speed cameras in mind, although Kearney would not rule out selling the user data for similar use in Australia.

Such data is being purchased from various mapping companies by governments on a fairly regular basis. It is not known if governments use this data for purposes other than the placement of speed cameras, such as to improve the road network, introduce traffic lights or find accident hotspots.

In November 2023, a woman in the United Kingdom was "following audio directions" when she drove down the slip road near the Little Brickhill junction near Milton Keynes, resulting in two deaths. In 2024, a coroner issued a warning to TomTom, Google, and Apple that their audio directions were dangerous. In a Prevention of Future Deaths report, the coroner noted police attending the crash saw three other vehicles "perform exactly the same manoeuvre and attempt to travel down the slip road in the wrong direction". TomTom said recent changes had been made to its verbal instructions in response to the report.

=== Open Map Community Controversies ===
In 2012, Tomtom made aggressive remarks on reliability of OpenStreetMap, an open-source mapping platform. TomTom would state that the openness of OpenStreetMap leads to vandalism to its data citing the case where Google Contractors were found to be vandalizing OpenStreetMap data with “100,000” vandalism incidents which was then found to be false but rather only a handful of the data changes were considered malicious, which was then reverted by the OpenStreetMap community.

Evaluation by researchers found that in Germany the difference between OSM and TomTom’s street network coverage was 9%. OSM in fact exceeded TomTom’s street network dataset by 27%.

Since 2012, TomTom has worked alongside OpenStreetMap with organised editing activities, and have been one of many sponsors of The State of The Map Conference for the OpenStreetMap community.

== Competition ==
TomTom's main retail car satellite navigation competitors are MiTAC (Navman and Magellan Navigation) and Garmin.

TomTom's main autonomous driving HD maps competitor is Here, which is owned by a consortium of German automotive companies including Audi, BMW, and Daimler.

== See also ==
- Azure Maps, which uses TomTom map data and services
- Comparison of commercial GPS software
- Apple Maps, which uses Tomtom data
