= Multi-track Turing machine =

A multitrack Turing machine is a specific type of multi-tape Turing machine.

In a standard n-tape Turing machine, n heads move independently along n tracks. In an n-track Turing machine, one head reads and writes on all tracks simultaneously. A tape position in an n-track Turing Machine contains n symbols from the tape alphabet. It is equivalent to the standard Turing machine and therefore accepts precisely the recursively enumerable languages.

== Formal definition ==
A multitrack Turing machine with $n$-tapes can be formally defined as a 6-tuple$M= \langle Q, \Sigma, \Gamma, \delta, q_0, F \rangle$, where

- $Q$ is a finite set of states;
- $\Sigma \subseteq \Gamma \setminus\{b\}$ is a finite set of input symbols, that is, the set of symbols allowed to appear in the initial tape contents;
- $\Gamma$ is a finite set of tape alphabet symbols;
- $q_0 \in Q$ is the initial state;
- $F \subseteq Q$ is the set of final or accepting states;
- $\delta: \left(Q \backslash F \times \Gamma^n \right) \rightarrow \left( Q \times \Gamma^n \times \{L,R\} \right)$ is a partial function called the transition function.

Sometimes also denoted as $\delta \left(Q_i,[x_1,x_2...x_n]\right)=(Q_j,[y_1,y_2...y_n],d)$, where $d \in \{L,R\}$.

A non-deterministic variant can be defined by replacing the transition function $\delta$ by a transition relation $\delta \subseteq \left(Q \backslash F \times \Gamma^n \right) \times \left( Q \times \Gamma^n \times \{L,R\} \right)$.

== Proof of equivalency to standard Turing machine ==
This will prove that a two-track Turing machine is equivalent to a standard Turing machine. This can be generalized to a n-track Turing machine. Let L be a recursively enumerable language. Let $M = \langle Q, \Sigma, \Gamma, \delta, q_0, F \rangle$ be standard Turing machine that accepts L. Let M' is a two-track Turing machine. To prove $M=M'$ it must be shown that $M \subseteq M'$ and $M' \subseteq M$.

- $M \subseteq M'$

If the second track is ignored then M and M' are clearly equivalent.

- $M' \subseteq M$

The tape alphabet of a one-track Turing machine equivalent to a two-track Turing machine consists of an ordered pair. The input symbol a of a Turing machine M' can be identified as an ordered pair $[x,y]$ of Turing machine M. The one-track Turing machine is:

$M = \langle Q, \Sigma \times {B}, \Gamma \times \Gamma, \delta ', q_0, F \rangle$ with the transition function $\delta \left(q_i,[x_1,x_2]\right)=\delta ' \left(q_i,[x_1,x_2]\right)$

This machine also accepts L.
