= Turing's method =

In mathematics, Turing's method is used to verify that for any given Gram point g_{m} there lie m + 1 zeros of ζ(s), in the region 0 < Im(s) < Im(g_{m}), where ζ(s) is the Riemann zeta function. It was discovered by Alan Turing and published in 1953, although that proof contained errors and a correction was published in 1970 by R. Sherman Lehman.

For every integer i with i < n we find a list of Gram points $\{g_i \mid 0\leqslant i \leqslant m \}$ and a complementary list $\{h_i \mid 0\leqslant i \leqslant m \}$, where g_{i} is the smallest number such that

$$(-1)^i Z(g_i + h_i) > 0,$$

where Z(t) is the Hardy Z function. Note that g_{i} may be negative or zero. Assuming that $h_m = 0$ and there exists some integer k such that $h_k = 0$, then if

$$1 + \frac{1.91 + 0.114\log(g_{m+k}/2\pi) + \sum_{j=m+1}^{m+k-1}h_j}{g_{m+k} - g_m} < 2,$$

and

$$-1 - \frac{1.91 + 0.114\log(g_m/2\pi) + \sum_{j=1}^{k-1}h_{m-j}}{g_m - g_{m-k}} > -2,$$

Then the bound is achieved and we have that there are exactly m + 1 zeros of ζ(s), in the region 0 < Im(s) < Im(g_{m}).
