= Dermot Turing =

British solicitor and author

Sir Dermot Turing Bt
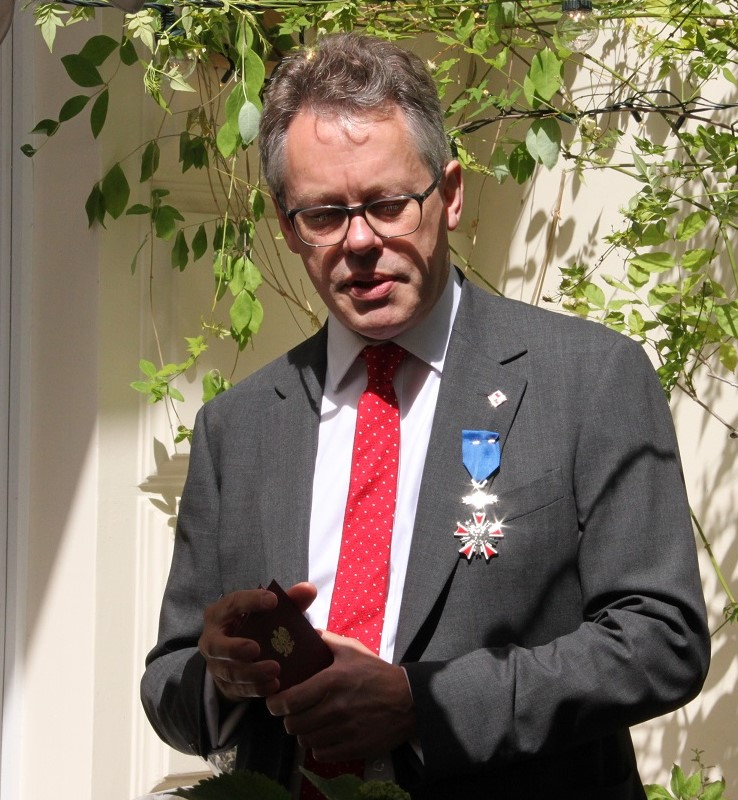
- Sir Dermot Turing in 2019
- Born: 26 February 1961 (age 65)
- Education: Sherborne School; University of Cambridge (BA); University of Oxford (DPhil)
- Known for: Prof: Alan Turing Decoded; X, Y & Z: The Real Story of How Enigma Was Broken
- Spouse: Nicola Jane Simmonds (m. 1986)
- Relatives: Alan Turing (uncle)
- Awards: Knight's Cross of the Order of Merit of the Republic of Poland (2020)
- Scientific career
- Workplaces: HM Treasury; Clifford Chance; Bletchley Park; The Turing Trust
- Thesis: Aspects of the regulation of larval serum protein synthesis in Drosophila (1985)
- Doctoral advisor: David B. Roberts
- Website: dermotturing.com

Sir John Dermot Turing, 12th Baronet (born 26 February 1961) is a British solicitor and author.

== Education ==
Turing was educated at Sherborne School and King's College, Cambridge. He then undertook a DPhil degree in the genetics of the fruit fly as a postgraduate student of New College, Oxford.

== Career ==
After his DPhil, Turing moved into the legal profession initially as an HM Treasury solicitor. He then worked at the international law firm Clifford Chance, where he was a partner until 2014 and latterly a consultant. He specialized in the financial sector, especially with respect to failed banks, regulation, and risk management.

In 2012, the centenary year of his uncle Alan Turing's birth, Dermot Turing became a trustee of Bletchley Park, where Alan worked as a cryptologist during World War II. In 2015, he wrote a book on Alan, Prof: Alan Turing Decoded, and in 2017, he contributed a chapter to The Turing Guide. He is a member of the European Post-Trade Forum and a trustee of the Turing Trust. His interests also include cryptanalysis and naval history.

Dermot Turing has commented on the accuracy of the 2014 film The Imitation Game, a dramatization of Alan Turing's life. In 2018, he published X, Y & Z: The Real Story of How Enigma Was Broken.

=== Awards and honours ===
In 2020, he was awarded the Knight's Cross of the Order of Merit of the Republic of Poland for highlighting the role of the Polish in breaking the Enigma Code. He is a visiting fellow at Kellogg College, Oxford.

== Family tree ==
Turing is the nephew of Alan Turing and the 12th Baronet in the Turing baronetcy. He is the son of John Ferrier Turing and Beryl Mary Ada Turing née Hann. In 1986, he married Nicola Jane Simmonds, daughter of Malcolm Douglas Simmonds. In 1987, he succeeded his third cousin as the 12th Turing Baronet. He has two sons: John Malcolm Ferrier, his heir apparent (born 1988) and James Robert Edward (born 1991)

Coat of arms of Dermot Turing
Crest A hand holding a helmet Proper. Escutcheon Argent on a bend Sable three boar’s heads Or. Supporters Two stags Proper. Motto Audentes Fortuna Juvat

Baronetage of Nova Scotia
Preceded by John Leslie Turing	Baronet (of Foveran); 1987–present	Incumbent
