= The Turing Trust =

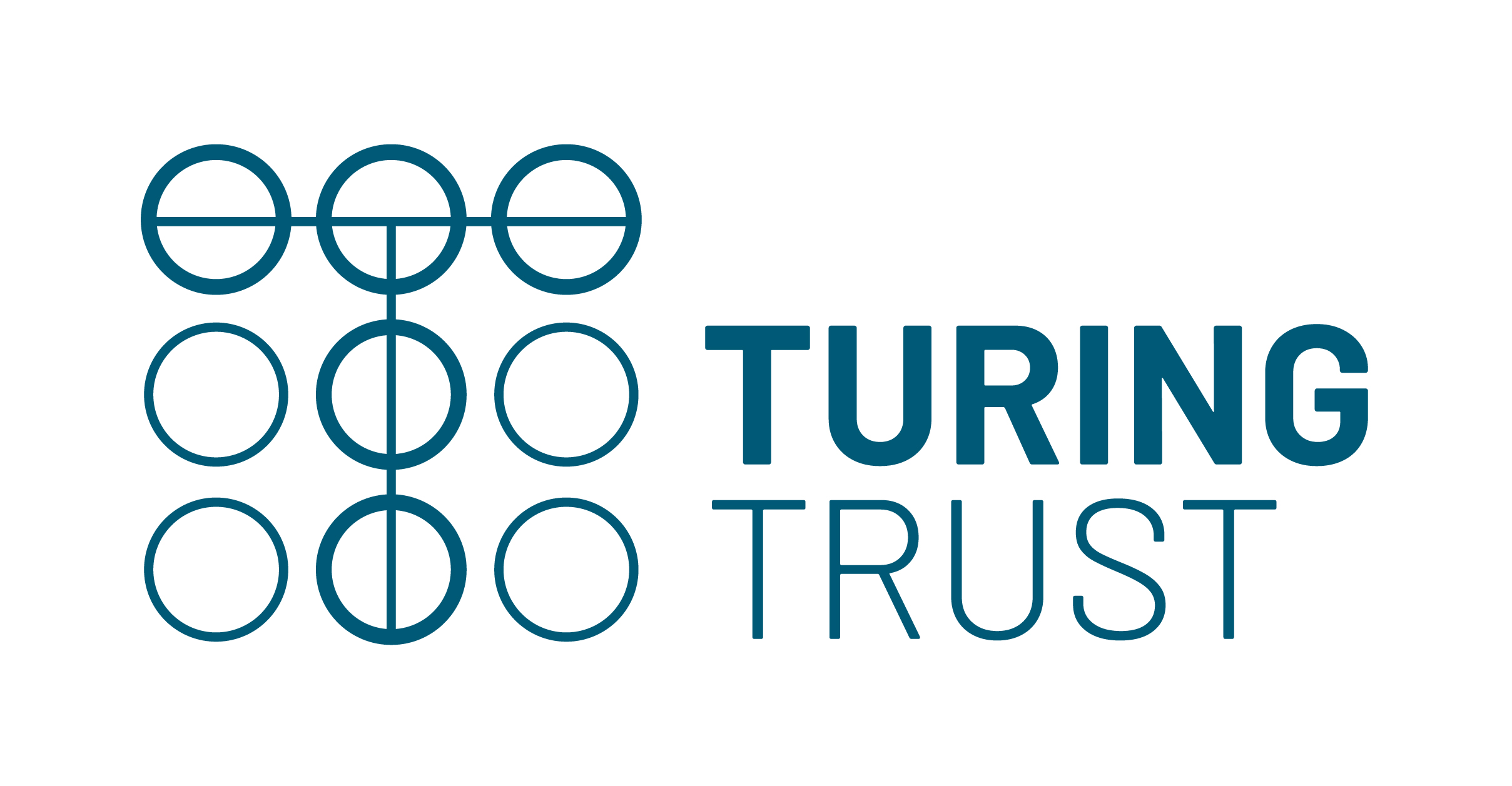

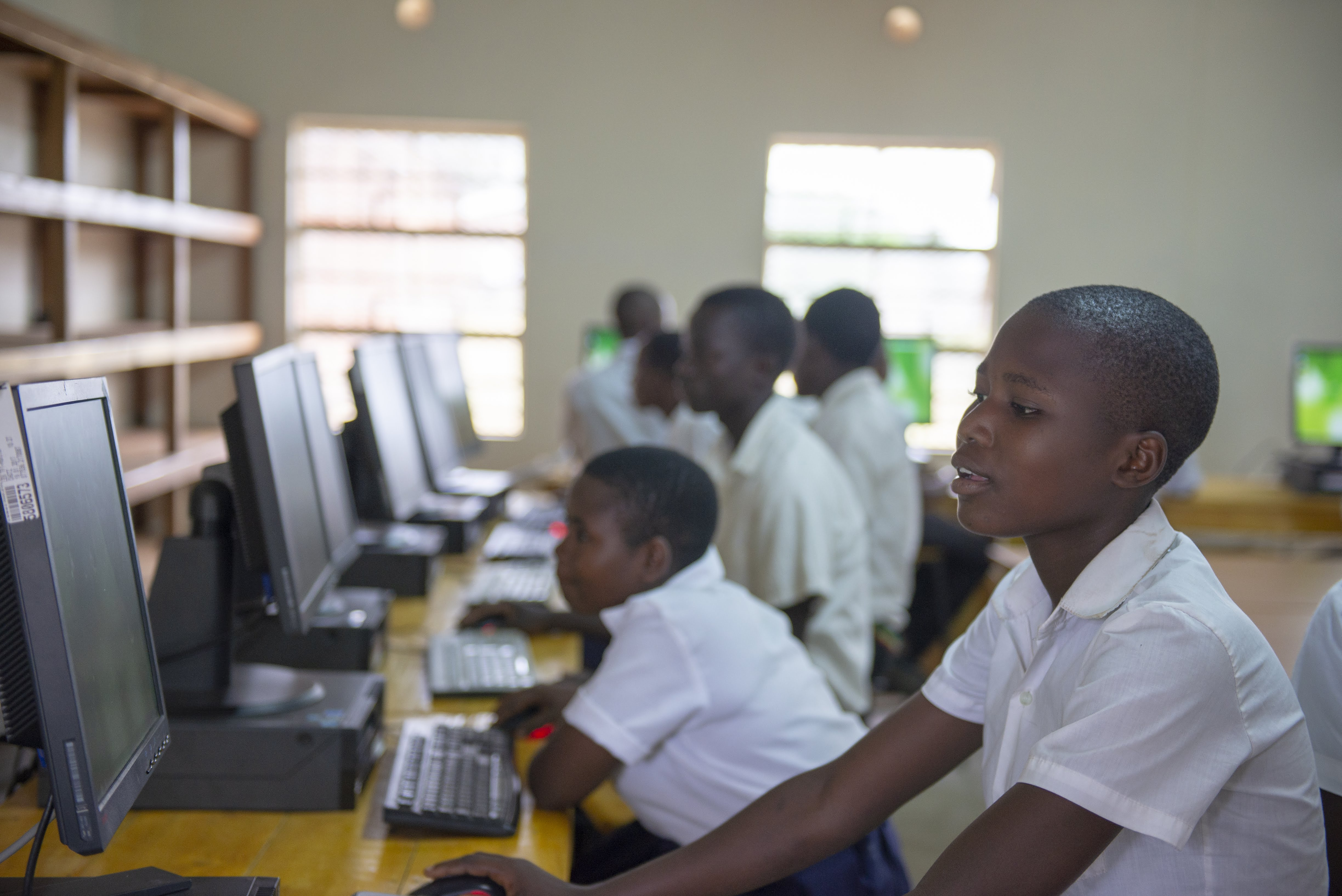
Students at Nyungwe Community Day Secondary School enjoying their new computer lab in 2018.

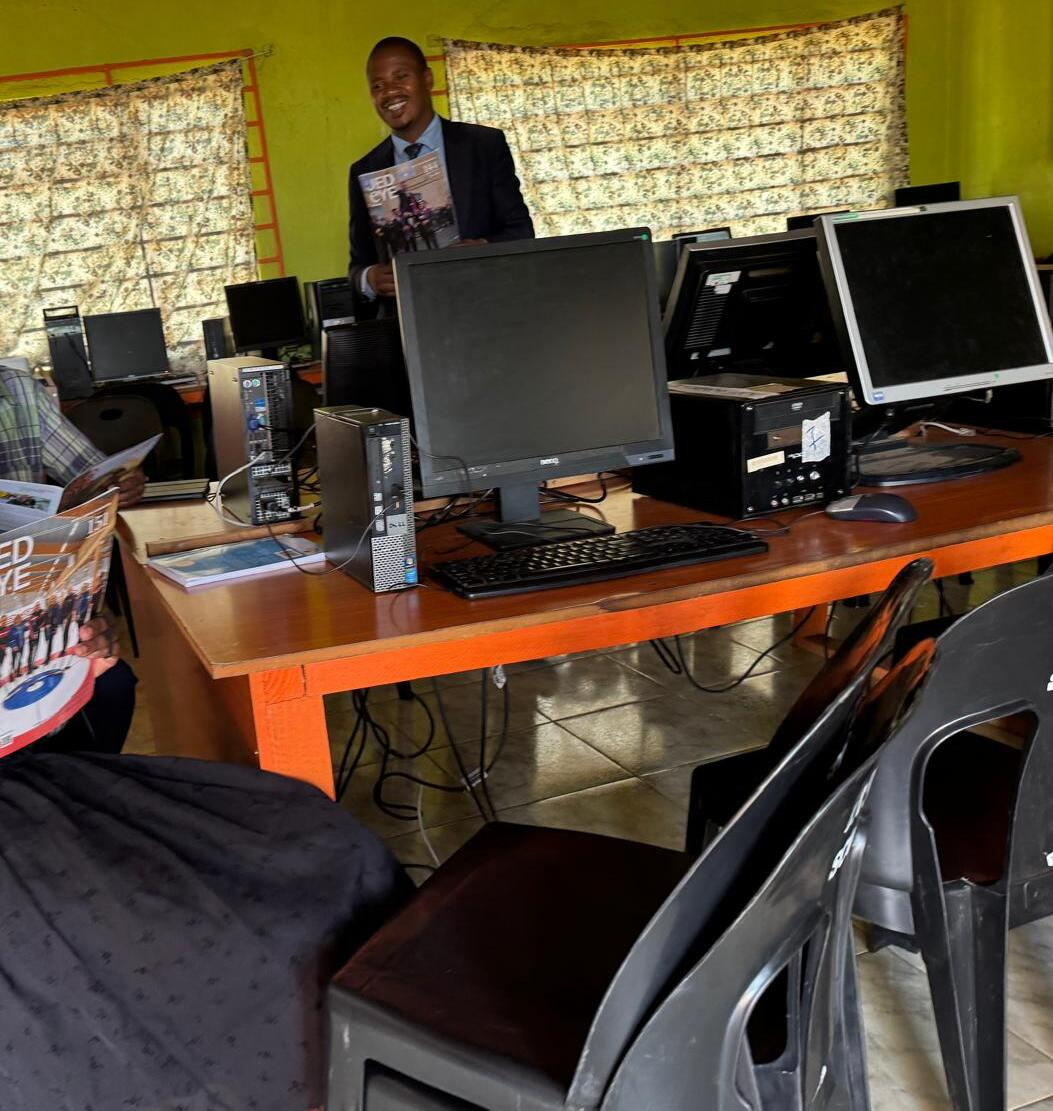
New computers at St Anthony Catholic Community Day Secondary School in Thondwe in 2026

The Turing Trust is a British charitable organisation that supports education in sub-Saharan Africa through the reuse of computers and improvement of associated teacher training.

== History ==
The trust was set up by the family of the computing pioneer Alan Turing. It was founded by Alan Turing's great-nephew, James Turing, in 2009. Sir Dermot Turing has been a trustee since its inception. Countries where the trust is active include Ghana, Kenya, and Malawi. Its main focus at present is in Malawi where it is working with Computers for Enhanced Education to set up computer labs in schools across the Northern and Central Regions.

The Turing Trust is a registered charity in England and Wales #1156687 and Scotland SC046150. It has partnered with Arcturus publishing in the production of a number of Turing-related puzzle books. The trust was based in Edinburgh, Scotland, and in 2020 moved to Loanhead, Midlothian, just south of Edinburgh.
