= Turing College, Kent =

College of the University of Kent

Coordinates: 51.294°N 1.063°E

Turing College
- University of Kent, UK
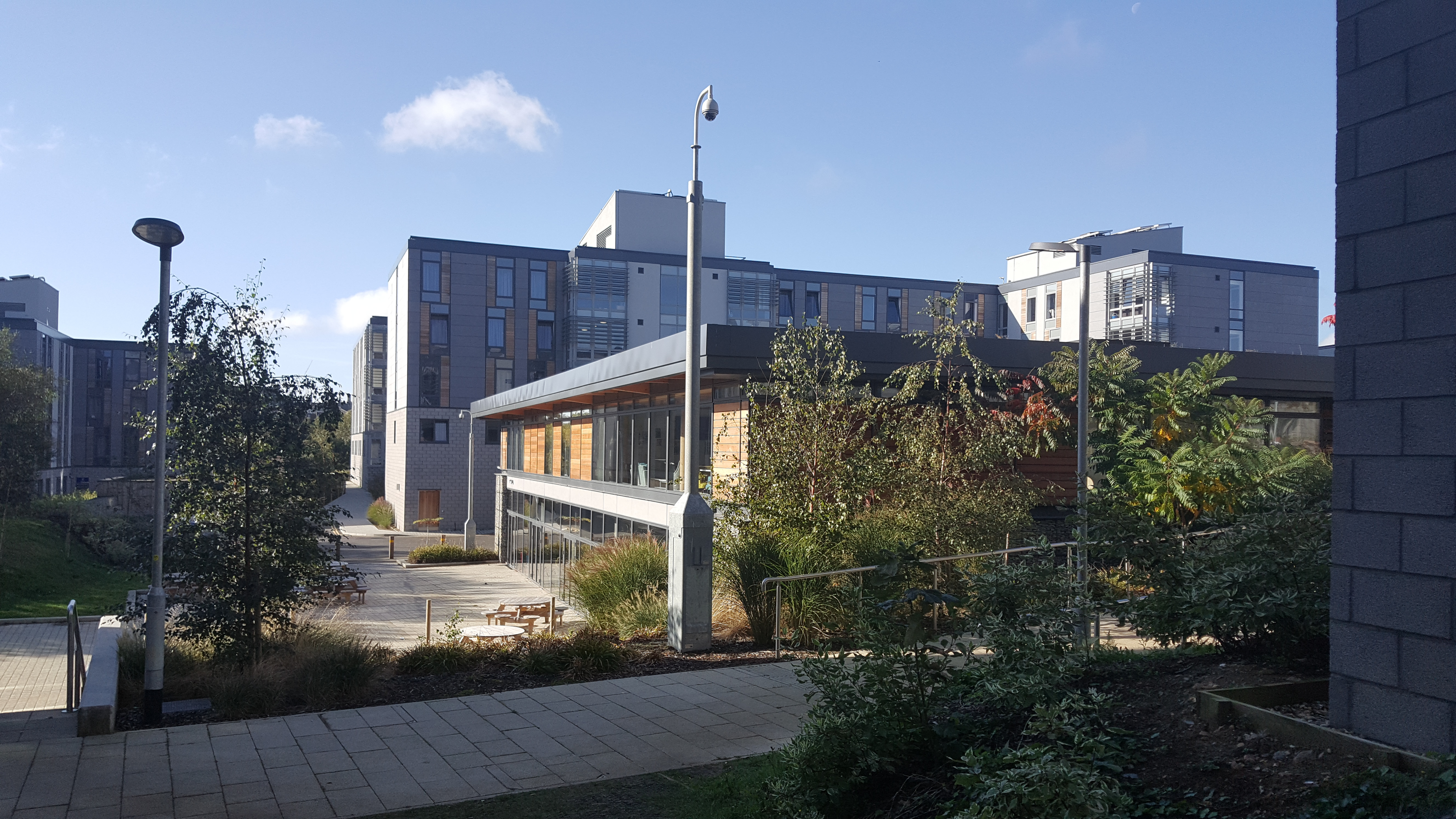
- Established: 2014; 11 years ago
- Named after: Alan Turing
- Website: www.kent.ac.uk

Turing College is a residential college at the University of Kent, established in 2014 as the university's sixth college. It was named after Alan Turing, a British mathematician and codebreaker, known for his foundational contributions to computer science and his pivotal role in breaking German codes during World War II at Bletchley Park.

The college was created to meet the growing demand for student accommodation at the university and was designed to support student living with modern facilities. It is distinct from other colleges at the University of Kent in that it serves as a purely residential college, with no academic departments or lecture spaces, except for a study area above the dining hall.

Named in honour of the mathematician and codebreaker Alan Turing, the college's residential accommodations are divided into "Turing Houses" and "Turing Flats". The dining area, "Hut 8", is named after Turing's section at Bletchley Park.

== Accommodation ==
Turing College offers self-catered accommodation, divided into two main types:

- Turing Houses: 282 single rooms with shared kitchen and bathroom facilities. Between nine and twelve bedrooms per house.
- Turing Flats: 519 en-suite rooms with shared kitchen facilities. Up to nine bedrooms per flat.

Accommodation costs include gas, heating, electricity, water, internet, personal contents insurance and a premium sports membership, for use at the university's sports centre.

== Facilities ==
Although Turing College does not house academic departments, it provides several facilities to support student life:

- Dining Area (Hut 8): Named in reference to the section of Bletchley Park where Alan Turing worked, the dining hall serves as the main communal area for students.
- Study Space: A dedicated study space is available above the dining area for students to engage in academic work.
