= Pieter Geelen =

Dutch entrepreneur

Pieter Geelen (born 1964) is a Dutch entrepreneur.

Geelen was born in January 1964 in Hilversum as the oldest child of the illustrator Harrie Geelen and the children's author Imme Dros. In 1991, he dropped off his Ph.D. research in Computer Science at the Universiteit van Amsterdam to found a company called Palmtop Software with his former university mate Peter-Frans Pauwels. This company was later renamed TomTom.

With the €100,000,000 he acquired from TomTom's IPO in 2005, he established the Turing Foundation, a charitable organization.

In 2013, he founded the Mapcode Foundation, another charitable organization which offers the Mapcode system he invented in 2001 with Harold Goddijn.
