= Turing machine (disambiguation) =

A Turing machine is an abstract mathematical computational device named after Alan Turing; see the box for variants of this meaning. Turing machine may also refer to:

- Automatic Computing Engine, an early computer designed by Turing using vacuum tubes and mercury delay lines
- Bombe, a machine built by Turing and others to decipher German codes during World War II
- Turing Machine (band), New York based instrumental rock band founded in 1998

== See also ==
- Lathe, sometimes referred to as a turning machine
- Turing machine examples, supplements main article
- Turing test, a test of whether a machine has human-level intelligence
