= Peter-Frans Pauwels =

Dutch entrepreneur (born 1965)

Peter-Frans Pauwels (born June 1965) is a Dutch entrepreneur.

In 1991, soon after he completed his studies in business and computer science at the Universiteit van Amsterdam, he founded, with his former university mate Pieter Geelen, a company called Palmtop Software, which was later renamed to TomTom.

In 2006, the Dutch magazine Quote stated that Pauwels was then the richest Dutch person less than 41 years old, with a fortune of about 766 million euros. In 2010, Quote ranked Pauwels the 100th richest Dutch person, with 280 million euros.
