= Turing test (disambiguation) =

The Turing test is a test proposed by Alan Turing of a machine's ability to exhibit intelligent behaviour.

The Turing Test may also refer to:

- The Turing Test (novel), a 2000 Doctor Who novel featuring Alan Turing as a character
- The Turing Test (video game), a 2016 video game
- The Turing Test, a chamber opera composed by Julian Wagstaff in 2007
