= Turing baronets =

Baronetcy in the Baronetage of Nova Scotia

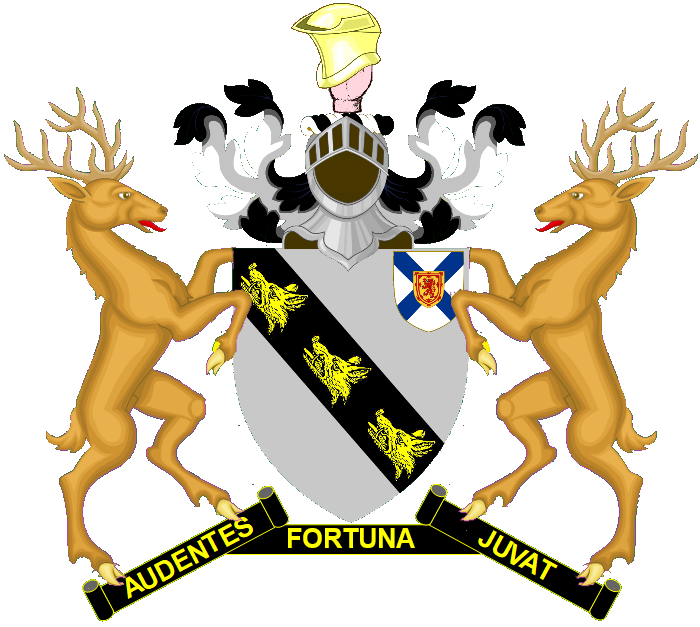
- Crest: A hand holding a helmet Proper.
- Shield: Argent on a bend Sable three boar’s heads Or.
- Supporters: Two stags Proper.
- Motto: Latin: Audentes Fortuna Juvat ("Fortune favours the bold")

The Turing Baronetcy, of Foveran in the County of Aberdeen, is a title in the Baronetage of Nova Scotia. It was created in 1638 for John Turing, who was granted the baronetcy of Foveran in Aberdeenshire by the King. He was a supporter of King Charles I and was taken prisoner by the Covenanters in 1639. In 1651, he fought at the Battle of Worcester. The Turing family descends from Sir William Turing, a supporter of David II (1329–1371).

The cryptographer and computing pioneer Alan Turing was the uncle of the twelfth Baronet.

== Turing baronets, of Foveran (1638) ==
The following have been Turing baronets:

- Sir John Turing, 1st Baronet (died 1662), created Baronet by the king
- Sir John Turing, 2nd Baronet (died 1682), grandson of his predecessor
- Sir John Turing, 3rd Baronet (1680–1733), grandnephew of the 1st Baronet
- Sir Alexander Turing, 4th Baronet (1702–1782), son of his predecessor
- Sir Inglis Turing, 5th Baronet (1743–1791), son of his predecessor
- Sir Robert Turing, 6th Baronet (1745–1831), brother of his predecessor
- Sir James Henry Turing, 7th Baronet (1791–1860), great-grandnephew of the 3rd Baronet
- Sir Robert Fraser Turing, 8th Baronet (1827–1913), son of his predecessor
- Sir James Walter Turing, 9th Baronet (1862–1928), son of his predecessor
- Sir Robert Andrew Henry Turing, 10th Baronet (1895–1970), son of his predecessor
- Sir John Leslie Turing, 11th Baronet (1895–1987), (younger twin) brother of his predecessor
- Sir John Dermot Turing, 12th Baronet (born 1961), great-great-grandnephew of the 7th Baronet
  - Heir Apparent: John Malcolm Ferrier Turing (born 1988), son
  - Second in line: James Robert Edward Turing (born 1991), son

=== Family tree ===
The Turing baronets are related as follows:

William Turing of Foveran d. 1613
John Turing, 1st Baronet d. 1662	Henry Turing d. 1657
George Turing d. 1657	John Turing; 1650–1681
John Turing, 2nd Baronet d. 1682	John Turing, 3rd Baronet; 1680–1733	Walter Turing; 1681–1743
Alexander Turing, 4th Baronet; 1702–1782	James Turing; 1714–1788
Inglis Turing, 5th Baronet; 1743–1791	Robert Turing, 6th Baronet; 1745–1831	John Turing; 1751–1798
James Turing, 7th Baronet; 1791–1860	John Turing; 1793–1828
Robert Turing, 8th Baronet; 1827–1913	John Turing; 1826–1883
James Turing, 9th Baronet; 1862–1928	Julius Turing; 1873–1947
Robert Turing, 10th Baronet; 1895 (Note: Older twin)–1970	John Turing, 11th Baronet; 1895 (Note: Younger twin)–1987	John Turing; 1908–1983	Alan Turing, OBE FRS; 1912–1954
John Turing, 12th Baronet b. 1961
John Turing, Heir Apparent b. 1988	James Turing b. 1991
