= List of accolades received by The Imitation Game =

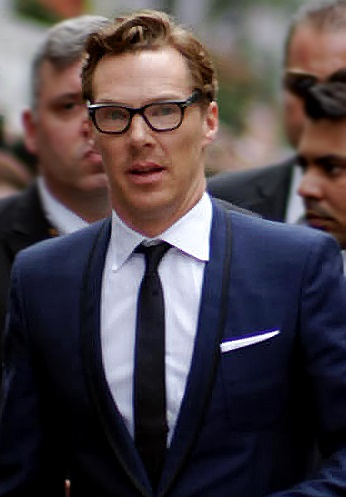
Benedict Cumberbatch at the premiere of the film at TIFF, September 2014

The Imitation Game is a 2014 British-American historical thriller film about British mathematician, logician, cryptanalyst and pioneering computer scientist Alan Turing, a key figure in cracking Nazi Germany's Enigma code that helped the Allies win the Second World War, only to later be criminally prosecuted for his homosexuality. It stars Benedict Cumberbatch as Turing and is directed by Morten Tyldum with a screenplay by Graham Moore, based on the biography Alan Turing: The Enigma by Andrew Hodges.

The film has been nominated for, and has received, numerous awards with Cumberbatch's portrayal of Turing particularly praised. The film and its cast and crew were also honoured by Human Rights Campaign, the largest LGBT civil rights advocacy group and political lobbying organisation in the United States. "We are proud to honor the stars and filmmakers of The Imitation Game for bringing the captivating yet tragic story of Alan Turing to the big screen", HRC president Chad Griffin said in a statement.

== Accolades ==
Award	Date of ceremony	Category	Recipients	Result	Ref.
4th AACTA International Awards	31 January 2015	Best Film		Nominated	
4th AACTA International Awards	31 January 2015	Best Direction	Morten Tyldum	Nominated	
4th AACTA International Awards	31 January 2015	Best Screenplay	Graham Moore	Nominated	
4th AACTA International Awards	31 January 2015	Best Actor	Benedict Cumberbatch	Nominated	
4th AACTA International Awards	31 January 2015	Best Supporting Actress	Keira Knightley	Nominated	
87th Academy Awards	22 February 2015	Best Picture	Nora Grossman, Ido Ostrowsky and Teddy Schwarzman	Nominated	
87th Academy Awards	22 February 2015	Best Director	Morten Tyldum	Nominated	
87th Academy Awards	22 February 2015	Best Actor	Benedict Cumberbatch	Nominated	
87th Academy Awards	22 February 2015	Best Supporting Actress	Keira Knightley	Nominated	
87th Academy Awards	22 February 2015	Best Adapted Screenplay	Graham Moore	Won	
87th Academy Awards	22 February 2015	Best Film Editing	William Goldenberg	Nominated	
87th Academy Awards	22 February 2015	Best Original Score	Alexandre Desplat	Nominated	
87th Academy Awards	22 February 2015	Best Production Design	Production Design: Maria Djurkovic; Set Decoration: Tatiana Macdonald	Nominated	
2014 ACE Eddie Awards	30 January 2015	Best Edited Feature Film – Dramatic	William Goldenberg	Nominated	
2014 Art Directors Guild Awards	31 January 2015	Excellence in Production Design for a Period Film	Maria Djurkovic	Nominated	
2014 ASC Award	15 February 2015	Theatrical Motion Picture	Óscar Faura	Nominated	
2014 Austin Film Critics Association	17 December 2014	Top Ten Films	The Imitation Game	8th Place	
2014 American Film Institute Awards	8 December 2014	Top Ten Films	The Imitation Game	Won	
68th British Academy Film Awards	8 February 2015	Best Film	The Imitation Game	Nominated	
68th British Academy Film Awards	8 February 2015	Best British Film	The Imitation Game	Nominated	
68th British Academy Film Awards	8 February 2015	Best Adapted Screenplay	Graham Moore	Nominated	
68th British Academy Film Awards	8 February 2015	Best Actor in a Leading Role	Benedict Cumberbatch	Nominated	
68th British Academy Film Awards	8 February 2015	Best Actress in a Supporting Role	Keira Knightley	Nominated	
68th British Academy Film Awards	8 February 2015	Best Editing	William Goldenberg	Nominated	
68th British Academy Film Awards	8 February 2015	Best Production Design	Maria Djurkovic, Tatiana MacDonald	Nominated	
68th British Academy Film Awards	8 February 2015	Best Costume Design	Sammy Sheldon Differ	Nominated	
68th British Academy Film Awards	8 February 2015	Best Sound	John Midgley, Lee Walpole, Stuart Hilliker, Martin Jensen	Nominated	
17th British Independent Film Awards	7 December 2014	Best Independent Film	The Imitation Game	Nominated	
17th British Independent Film Awards	7 December 2014	Best Screenplay	Graham Moore	Nominated	
17th British Independent Film Awards	7 December 2014	Best Actor	Benedict Cumberbatch	Nominated	
17th British Independent Film Awards	7 December 2014	Best Actress	Keira Knightley	Nominated	
2014 Costume Designers Guild Awards	February 17, 2015	Excellence in Period Film	Sammy Sheldon Differ	Nominated	
20th Critics' Choice Movie Awards	15 January 2015	Critics' Choice Movie Award for Best Picture	The Imitation Game	Nominated	
20th Critics' Choice Movie Awards	15 January 2015	Critics' Choice Movie Award for Best Actor	Benedict Cumberbatch	Nominated	
20th Critics' Choice Movie Awards	15 January 2015	Critics' Choice Movie Award for Best Supporting Actress	Keira Knightley	Nominated	
20th Critics' Choice Movie Awards	15 January 2015	Critics' Choice Movie Award for Best Acting Ensemble	Matthew Beard, Benedict Cumberbatch, Charles Dance, Matthew Goode, Rory Kinnear, Keira Knightley, Allen Leech and Mark Strong	Nominated	
20th Critics' Choice Movie Awards	15 January 2015	Critics' Choice Movie Award for Best Screenplay	Graham Moore	Nominated	
20th Critics' Choice Movie Awards	15 January 2015	Critics' Choice Movie Award for Best Score	Alexandre Desplat	Nominated	
2014 Detroit Film Critics Society Awards	15 December 2014	Best Actor	Benedict Cumberbatch	Nominated	
67th Directors Guild of America Awards	7 February 2015	Outstanding Directing – Feature Film	Morten Tyldum	Nominated	
2014 Dublin Film Critics' Circle Awards	17 December 2014	Best Actor	Benedict Cumberbatch	6th Place	
GLAAD Media Award	21 March 2015	Outstanding Film – Wide Release	The Imitation Game	Won	
72nd Golden Globe Awards	11 January 2015	Golden Globe Award for Best Motion Picture – Drama	The Imitation Game	Nominated	
72nd Golden Globe Awards	11 January 2015	Golden Globe Award for Best Screenplay	Graham Moore	Nominated	
72nd Golden Globe Awards	11 January 2015	Golden Globe Award for Best Actor – Motion Picture Drama	Benedict Cumberbatch	Nominated	
72nd Golden Globe Awards	11 January 2015	Golden Globe Award for Best Supporting Actress – Motion Picture	Keira Knightley	Nominated	
72nd Golden Globe Awards	11 January 2015	Golden Globe Award for Best Original Score	Alexandre Desplat	Nominated	
2014 Hamptons International Film Festival	14 October 2014	Alfred P. Sloan Feature Film Prize	The Imitation Game	Won	
2014 Hamptons International Film Festival	14 October 2014	Narrative Competition Audience Award	The Imitation Game	Won	
2014 Heartland Film Festival	30 October 2014	Truly Moving Picture Award	The Imitation Game	Won	
18th Hollywood Film Awards	14 November 2014	Hollywood Supporting Actress Award	Keira Knightley	Won	
18th Hollywood Film Awards	14 November 2014	Hollywood Actor Award	Benedict Cumberbatch	Won	
18th Hollywood Film Awards	14 November 2014	Hollywood Director Award	Morten Tyldum	Won	
18th Hollywood Film Awards	14 November 2014	Hollywood Film Composer Award	Alexandre Desplat	Won	
Houston Film Critics Society Awards	12 January 2015	Best Picture	The Imitation Game	Nominated	
Houston Film Critics Society Awards	12 January 2015	Best Actor	Benedict Cumberbatch	Nominated	
Houston Film Critics Society Awards	12 January 2015	Best Supporting Actress	Keira Knightley	Nominated	
Houston Film Critics Society Awards	12 January 2015	Best Original Score	Alexander Desplat	Nominated	
International Film Music Critics Association Awards	19 February 2015	Best Original Score for a Drama	Alexandre Desplat	Nominated	
2014 London Film Critics' Circle Awards	18 January 2015	British Film of the Year	The Imitation Game	Nominated	
2014 London Film Critics' Circle Awards	18 January 2015	Actor of the Year	Benedict Cumberbatch	Nominated	
2014 London Film Critics' Circle Awards	18 January 2015	British Actor of the Year	Benedict Cumberbatch	Nominated	
2014 London Film Critics' Circle Awards	18 January 2015	British Actress of the Year	Keira Knightley	Nominated	
2014 London Film Critics' Circle Awards	18 January 2015	Young British Performer of the Year	Alex Lawther	Won	
2014 Mill Valley Film Festival Awards	14 October 2014	Overall Audience Favorite	The Imitation Game	Won	
MPSE Golden Reel Awards	15 February 2015	Feature English Language - Dialogue/ADR	Lee Walpole	Nominated	
2014 National Board of Review Awards	3 December 2014	Top Ten Films	The Imitation Game	Won	
2015 Newport Beach Film Festival Awards	5 January 2015	Best Picture	The Imitation Game	Won	
2015 Newport Beach Film Festival Awards	5 January 2015	Outstanding Ensemble Cast	Benedict Cumberbatch, Keira Knightley, Matthew Goode, Rory Kinnear, Allen Leech, Matthew Beard, Charles Dance and Mark Strong	Won	
2014 Palm Springs International Film Festival Awards	3 January 2015	Best Ensemble Cast	Matthew Beard, Benedict Cumberbatch, Charles Dance, Matthew Goode, Rory Kinnear, Keira Knightley, Allen Leech and Mark Strong	Won	
2014 Producers Guild of America Awards	24 January 2015	Best Theatrical Motion Picture	Nora Grossman, Ido Ostrowsky, Teddy Schwarzman	Nominated	
2014 San Diego Film Critics Society Awards	15 December 2014	Best Supporting Actress	Keira Knightley	Nominated	
2014 San Diego Film Festival Awards	3 October 2014	Best Gala Film	The Imitation Game	Won	
2014 San Francisco Film Critics Circle Awards	14 December 2014	Best Picture	The Imitation Game	Nominated	
2014 San Francisco Film Critics Circle Awards	14 December 2014	Best Actor	Benedict Cumberbatch	Nominated	
2014 San Francisco Film Critics Circle Awards	14 December 2014	Best Adapted Screenplay	Graham Moore	Nominated	
19th Satellite Awards	15 February 2015	Best Motion Picture	The Imitation Game	Nominated	
19th Satellite Awards	15 February 2015	Best Actor	Benedict Cumberbatch	Nominated	
19th Satellite Awards	15 February 2015	Best Actress in a Supporting Role	Keira Knightley	Nominated	
19th Satellite Awards	15 February 2015	Best Art Direction and Production Design	Maria Djurkovic and Nick Dent	Nominated	
19th Satellite Awards	15 February 2015	Best Director	Morten Tyldum	Nominated	
19th Satellite Awards	15 February 2015	Best Film Editing	William Goldenberg	Nominated	
19th Satellite Awards	15 February 2015	Best Original Score	Alexandre Desplat	Nominated	
19th Satellite Awards	15 February 2015	Best Adapted Screenplay	Graham Moore	Won	
21st Screen Actors Guild Awards	25 January 2015	Outstanding Performance by a Male Actor in a Leading Role	Benedict Cumberbatch	Nominated	
21st Screen Actors Guild Awards	25 January 2015	Screen Actors Guild Award for Outstanding Performance by a Female Actor in a Supporting Role	Keira Knightley	Nominated	
21st Screen Actors Guild Awards	25 January 2015	Screen Actors Guild Award for Outstanding Performance by a Cast in a Motion Picture	Matthew Beard, Benedict Cumberbatch, Charles Dance, Matthew Goode, Rory Kinnear, Keira Knightley, Allen Leech and Mark Strong	Nominated	
2014 St. Louis Film Critics Association Awards	15 December 2015	Best Film	The Imitation Game	Nominated	
2014 St. Louis Film Critics Association Awards	15 December 2015	Best Adapted Screenplay	Graham Moore	Nominated	
2014 St. Louis Film Critics Association Awards	15 December 2015	Best Actor	Benedict Cumberbatch	Nominated	
2014 St. Louis Film Critics Association Awards	15 December 2015	Best Supporting Actress	Keira Knightley	Nominated	
2014 St. Louis Film Critics Association Awards	15 December 2015	Best Director	Morten Tyldum	Nominated	
39th Toronto International Film Festival Awards	14 September 2014	People's Choice Award for Best Film	The Imitation Game	Won	
2014 USC Scripter Awards	31 January 2015	Best Adapted Screenplay	Graham Moore, Andrew Hodges	Won	
2014 Vancouver Film Critics Circle Awards	5 January 2015	Best Actor	Benedict Cumberbatch	Nominated	
2014 Visual Effects Society Awards	4 February 2015	Outstanding Supporting Visual Effects in a Photoreal/Live Action Feature Motion Picture	Stuart Bullen, Lucy Ainsworth-Taylor, Simon Rowe	Nominated	
2014 Washington D.C. Area Film Critics Association Awards	8 December 2014	Best Actor	Benedict Cumberbatch	Nominated	
2014 Washington D.C. Area Film Critics Association Awards	8 December 2014	Best Adapted Screenplay	Graham Moore	Nominated	
2014 Writers Guild of America Awards	14 February 2015	Best Adapted Screenplay	Graham Moore	Won	
