= The Turing Guide =

2017 book

- Author: Jack Copeland, Jonathan Bowen, Mark Sprevak, Robin Wilson, et al.
- Cover artist: Peter Fitzpatrick, Vicki Hyde
- Language: English
- Subject: Alan Turing (1912–1954)
- Genre: Non-fiction, history of science
- Publisher: Oxford University Press
- Publication date: January 2017
- Publication place: United Kingdom
- Media type: Print (hardcover, paperback, e-book)
- Pages: xv+546
- ISBN: 978-0-19-874783-3
- OCLC: 958479379

The Turing Guide, written by Jack Copeland, Jonathan Bowen, Mark Sprevak, Robin Wilson, and others and published in 2017, is a book about the work and life of the British mathematician, philosopher, and early computer scientist, Alan Turing (1912–1954).

== Overview ==
The book includes 42 contributed chapters by a variety of authors, including some contemporaries of Alan Turing. The book was published in January 2017 by Oxford University Press, in hardcover, paperback, and e-book formats.

== Contents ==
The Turing Guide is divided into eight main parts, covering various aspects of Alan Turing's life and work:

1. Biography: Biographical aspects of Alan Turing.
2. The Universal Machine and Beyond: Turing's universal machine (now known as a Turing machine), developed while at King's College, Cambridge, which provides a theoretical framework for reasoning about computation, a starting point for the field of theoretical computer science.
3. Codebreaker: Turing's work on codebreaking during World War II at Bletchley Park, especially the Bombe for decrypting the German Enigma machine.
4. Computers after the War: Turing's post-War work on computing, at the National Physical Laboratory (NPL) and at the University of Manchester. He made contributions to both hardware design, through the ACE computer (later implemented as the Pilot ACE) at the NPL, and software, especially at Manchester using the Manchester Baby computer, later the Manchester Mark 1 and Ferranti Mark 1.
5. Artificial Intelligence and the Mind: Turing's pioneering and philosophical contribution to machine intelligence (now known as Artificial Intelligence or AI), including the Turing test.
6. Biological Growth: Morphogenesis, Turing's last major scientific contribution, on the generation of complex patterns through chemical processes in biology and on the mathematics behind them, foundational in mathematical biology.
7. Mathematics: Some of Turing's mathematical achievements, including one of his most significant influences, Max Newman.
8. Finale: Turing in a wider subsequent context, including his influence and legacy to science and in the public consciousness.

The book includes a foreword by Andrew Hodges, a preface, notes on the contributors, endnotes, and an index.

== Contributors ==
The following 33 authors contributed to chapters in the book:

- Ruth Baker
- Mavis Batey
- Margaret Boden
- Jonathan Bowen
- Martin Campbell-Kelly
- Brian Carpenter
- Catherine Caughey
- Jack Copeland
- Robert Doran
- Rod Downey
- Ivor Grattan-Guinness
- Joel Greenberg
- Simon Greenish
- Peter Hilton
- Eleanor Ireland
- David Leavitt
- Jason Long
- Philip Maini
- Dani Prinz
- Diane Proudfoot
- Brian Randell
- Bernard Richards
- Jerry Roberts
- Oron Shagrir
- Edward Simpson
- Mark Sprevak
- Doron Swade
- Sir John Dermot Turing
- Jean Valentine
- Robin Whitty
- Robin Wilson
- Stephen Wolfram
- Thomas Wooley

== Reviews ==
The book has been reviewed by a number of journals, magazines, and professional organizations, including:

- Engineering & Technology.
- European Mathematical Society.
- Formal Aspects of Computing.
- Mathematical Association of America.
- New Scientist.
- Notices of the American Mathematical Society.
- Nuncius.
- Physics World.
- Resurrection.
- SIAM News.

The book has also been featured online internationally, including in China.

== Cover ==
This artwork for the book's cover came about after a mock-up digital artwork in the style of the multiple images of Andy Warhol was produced. Jack Copeland then organized a more professional artwork, which became the basis for the eventual book cover. In 2023, the artwork was displayed as part of a digital art exhibition organized by the Computer Arts Society at the BCS in London.

== Other languages ==
A Chinese edition of the book was published in 2023 by Tsinghua University Press.

== See also ==
- Andrew Hodges, Alan Turing: The Enigma (1983).
- Charles Petzold, The Annotated Turing (2008).
- Dermot Turing, Prof: Alan Turing Decoded (2015).
