= Robert W. Doran =

New Zealand computer scientist (1944–2018)

Bob Doran HFNZCS
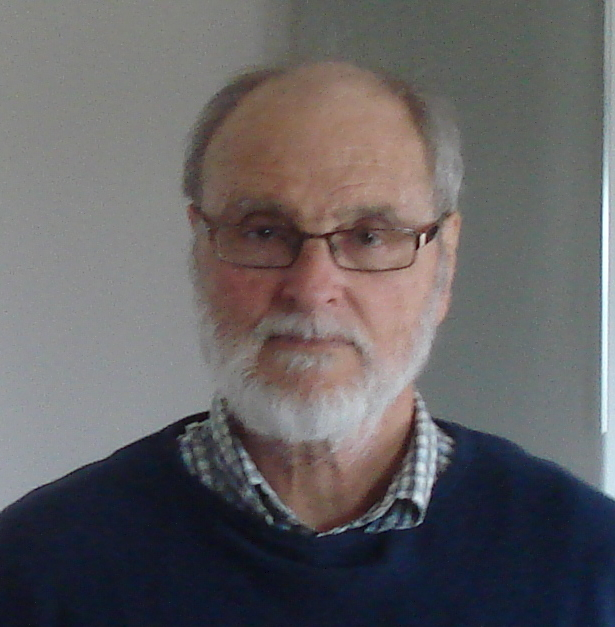
- Robert W, Doran in 2012 in Cambridge, England
- Born: 5 November 1944
- Died: 13 October 2018 (aged 73); Auckland, New Zealand
- Citizenship: New Zealand
- Education: University of Canterbury, Stanford University
- Known for: History of computing
- Scientific career
- Fields: Computer science
- Workplaces: City University, Massey University, Amdahl Corporation, University of Auckland

Robert William Doran HFNZCS (5 November 1944 – 13 October 2018) was a New Zealand-based computer scientist and historian of computing. He was Professor Emeritus of Computer Science at the University of Auckland, New Zealand.

Doran studied at the University of Canterbury (New Zealand) and for a master's degree in computer science from Stanford University (California, United States) in 1967. He taught at City University (London, England) and Massey University (Palmerston North, New Zealand). He first worked with computers in 1963. He was a Principal Computer Architect at Amdahl Corporation (Sunnyvale, California) during 1976–1982. He joined the Department of Computer Science at the University of Auckland in 1982 and was Head of department. He maintained computing history displays in the department, especially of totalisators. The history displays are now part of The Bob Doran Museum of Computing.

Doran's research interests included computer architecture, parallel algorithms, and computer programming. He was also interested in the history of computing. In 2017, he contributed to The Turing Guide.

Doran was made an Honorary Fellow of the New Zealand Computer Society, now the Institute of IT Professionals.

Doran died on 13 October 2018 at home in Auckland.

== Selected publications ==
- Carpenter, B. E. & Doran, R. W. (1977). The other Turing machine. The Computer Journal, 20(3):269–279.
- Doran, R. W. (1977). Computer Architecture: A Structured Approach. Academic Press, 1979.
- Doran, R. W. & Thomas, L. K. (1980). Variants of the software solution to mutual exclusion. Information Processing Letters, 10(4/5):206–208, July.
- Carpenter, B. E. & Doran, R. W. (1986). AM Turing's ACE Report of 1946 and Other Papers, Vol. 10, Charles Babbage Institute Reprint Series for the History of Computing, MIT Press.
- Doran, R. W. (1988). Variants of an improved carry look-ahead adder. IEEE Transactions on Computers, 37(9):1110–1113. doi:10.1109/12.2261
- Doran, R. W. (1988). Amdahl Multiple-Domain Architecture. Computer, 21(10):20–28. doi:10.1109/2.7054
- Thomborson, C. D. & Doran, R. W. (2005). Incredible Codes. In A. Brook (ed.), Incredible Science: Explore the Wonderful World of Science (pp. 16–17). New Zealand: Penguin Books.
- Doran, R. W. (1995). Special cases of division, Journal of Universal Computer Science, 1(3):176–194.
- Doran, R. W. (2005). Computer architecture and the ACE computers. In B. J. Copeland (ed.), Alan Turing's Automatic Computing Engine (pp. 193–206). Oxford: Oxford University Press.
- Doran, R. W. (2007). The Gray code. Journal of Universal Computer Science, 13(11):1573–1597.
- Doran, R. W. (2007). The First Automatic Totalisator. The Rutherford Journal, 2.
- Carpenter, B. E. & Doran, R. W. (2014). John Womersley: Applied Mathematician and Pioneer of Modern Computing. IEEE Annals of the History of Computing, 36(2):60–70. doi:10.1109/MAHC.2014.25

Doran is also a listed inventor on the following US patents assigned to Amdahl Corporation: 4503512 (1985), 4967342 (1990), 5109522 (1992).
