= Paul Mockapetris =

American computer scientist and Internet pioneer

Paul V. Mockapetris
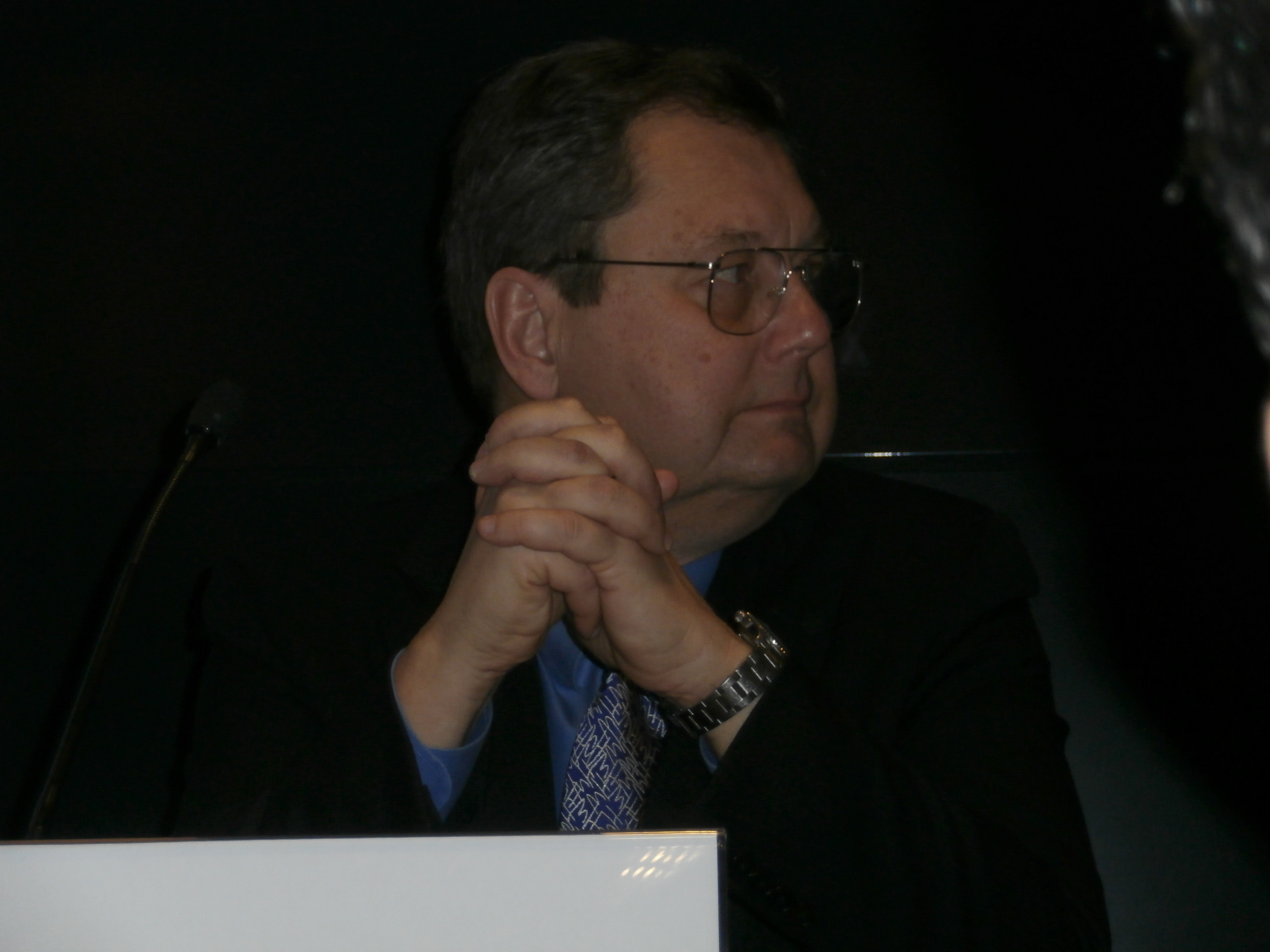
- Paul Mockapetris in Barcelona in 2013
- Born: November 18, 1948 (age 77); Boston, Massachusetts, United States
- Education: Massachusetts Institute of Technology; University of California, Irvine
- Known for: Inventing the Domain Name System
- Awards: IEEE Internet Award (2003); ACM Fellow (2004); SIGCOMM Award (2005); Software System Award (2019)
- Scientific career
- Fields: Computer Science

Paul V. Mockapetris (born November 18, 1948 in Boston, Massachusetts, US) is an American computer scientist and Internet pioneer, who invented the Internet Domain Name System (DNS).

== Education ==
Mockapetris graduated from the Boston Latin School in 1966, received his bachelor's degrees in physics and electrical engineering from the Massachusetts Institute of Technology in 1971 and his doctorate in information and computer science from the University of California, Irvine in 1982.

== Career ==
In 1983, he proposed a Domain Name System architecture in RFC 882 and RFC 883, while working at the USC Information Sciences Institute. He had recognized the problem in the early Internet (then ARPAnet) of holding name to address translations in a single table on the hosts file of an operating system. Instead he proposed a distributed and dynamic DNS database: essentially DNS as it exists today.

== Achievements ==
Mockapetris is a fellow of the IEEE and the Association for Computing Machinery. He:

- joined the USC Information Sciences Institute in 1978, where he:
  - developed the first SMTP email server,
  - proposed the DNS architecture in 1983,
  - wrote the first DNS implementation (called "Jeeves") for the TOPS-20 in 1983,
  - served as director of the high performance computing and communications division;
- was program manager for networking at the Advanced Research Projects Agency (ARPA) of the U.S. Department of Defense from 1990 to 1993;
- served as chair of the Research Working Group of the U.S. Federal Networking Council;
- served as chair of the Internet Engineering Task Force (IETF) from 1994 to 1996;
- was a member of the Internet Architecture Board (IAB) in 1994 and 1995;
- worked for several Internet-related companies: employee number two at @Home (1995–1997), Software.com (1997–1998) (now OpenWave), Fiberlane (now Cisco), Cerent/Siara (now Redback Networks) (1998–1999), Urban Media (1999–2001), and NU Domain (from 1999);
- was Chief Scientist and chairman of the Board of IP address infrastructure software provider Nominum (1999 to 2016).
- is currently Chief Scientist at ThreatSTOP.

== Awards ==
- 1997 John C. Dvorak Telecommunications Excellence Award "Personal Achievement - Network Engineering" for DNS design and implementation
- 2002 Distinguished Alumnus award from the University of California, Irvine
- 2003 IEEE Internet Award for his contributions to DNS
- 2004 ACM Fellow, for contributions to the Internet, including the development of domain and email protocols.
- 2005 ACM SIGCOMM Award for lifetime contribution to the field of communication networks in recognition of his foundational work in designing, developing and deploying the Domain Name System, and his sustained leadership in overall Internet architecture development
- 2006 ACM SIGCOMM Test of Time Paper Award for co-authoring paper "Development of the Domain Name System"
- 2006 National Academy of Engineering Member
- 2012 inducted by the Internet Society into the Internet Hall of Fame as an "innovator"
- 2013 Honoris Causa (honorary degree) by Miguel Hernández University (Alicante, Spain)
- 2019 ACM Software System Award

== Requests for Comments (RFCs) ==
- RFC 1035 - Domain Names - Implementation and Specification, November 1987
- RFC 1034 - Domain Names - Concepts and Facilities, November 1987
- RFC 973 - Domain System Changes and Observations, January 1986 (obsoleted by 1034 and 1035)
- RFC 883 - Domain Names - Implementation and Specification, November 1983 (updated by 973, obsoleted by 1034 and 1035)
- RFC 882 - Domain Names - Concepts and Facilities, November 1983 (updated by 973, obsoleted by 1034 and 1035)

Preceded by Phil Gross	IETF Chair; 1994–1996	Succeeded by Fred Baker
