= Allison Mankin =

American computer scientist

Allison Mankin is an American computer scientist and prominent figure in the area of Internet governance. She previously served as the Internet Research Task Force (IRTF) Chair and holds numerous leadership positions within the Internet Engineering Task Force (IETF), which is known for developing Internet standards.

In anticipation of the internet growing beyond the capabilities of then-current IP Addressing schemes, in the mid-1990s Mankin, alongside Scott Bradner, was tasked by the IETF to head the new Internet Protocol Next Generation (IPng) area. The IPng area was tasked with designing and defining the next generation of IP Addressing, eventually publishing their recommendation and coining the name IPv6.

In 1993, Mankin founded the Systers program at the IETF, an informal mentoring and networking initiative for women in tech.

== Selected publications ==
As of 2022, Mankin has over 3700 citations to her work with an h-index of 29.

- Mankin, A.; Massey, D.; Wu, Chien-Lung; Wu, S.F.; Zhang, Lixia (2001). "On design and evaluation of "intention-driven" ICMP traceback". Proceedings Tenth International Conference on Computer Communications and Networks (Cat. No.01EX495). pp. 159–165. doi:10.1109/ICCCN.2001.956234. ISBN 0-7803-7128-3. S2CID 6391235.
- Brander, S.; Mankin, A. "hjp: doc: RFC 1752: The Recommendation for the IP Next Generation Protocol". www.hjp.at.
