= A Man from the Future =

Studio album by Pet Shop Boys
- Released: 9 October 2026
- Recorded: 2012–2026
- Genres: Electronic; spoken word
- Length: 47:46
- Labels: x2; Parlophone
- Producers: Pet Shop Boys; Sven Helbig

Pet Shop Boys chronology
Futhermore (2024)	A Man from the Future (2026)

A Man from the Future (stylised in sentence case) is an electronic/orchestral album by Pet Shop Boys, released on 9 October 2026 through the band's own label x2 and Parlophone. It is a concept album that follows the life of Alan Turing and his legacy and is a collaboration with Turing biographer Andrew Hodges. The album is credited to Tennant/Lowe/Hodges.

== Background and original performance ==
The duo originally wrote the songs with Hodges around 2012–2013, later performing it with the BBC Concert Orchestra at a BBC Prom in July 2014. They later decided to revise the piece to "give it more of an electronic emphasis", and Sven Helbig, the original orchestrator, suggested reworking his orchestrations in a more intimate arrangement for eight string players. The band said about the album, "Our motive in creating this work was to make a musical memorial to Alan Turing who gave so much to his country and the world and was rewarded for it by being prosecuted for his sexuality".

== Composition and lyrics ==
The album features string arrangements composed by Helbig and performed by the Manchester Camerata Octet. Actress Juliet Stevenson provides spoken word narration adapted from Hodges' book Alan Turing: The Enigma. Four of the eight songs additionally feature children from Manchester Grammar School choir. The title track features an excerpt from a 2009 statement made by former Prime Minister Gordon Brown acknowledging Turing's work and apologizing for the inhumane treatment he received, which is followed by the posthumous royal pardon granted by Queen Elizabeth II in 2013.

== Story ==
The songs recount Turing's school days and early interest in mathematics, his time at Cambridge University, his work breaking the German Enigma machine's codes during the Second World War, his role in the invention of the digital computer and his early predictions about artificial intelligence, his trial and conviction for a homosexual relationship, his death in 1954, and his legacy.

== Promotion and release ==
Before the album's release, the BBC exclusively premiered the album on 4 October on BBC Radio 6 Music during Stuart Maconie's Freak Zone and BBC Radio 3 during Unclassified, followed by availability on BBC Sounds. After the premieres, the duo and Hodges sat down for two interviews with BBC Radio 6 Music presenter Stuart Maconie and BBC Radio 3 presenter Elizabeth Alker to reflect on the original performance and its 2026 evolution. The day before its release, the duo and Andrew Hodges hosted an album listening party at the Imperial War Museum North in Greater Manchester.

== Track listing ==
All tracks are written by Chris Lowe, Neil Tennant, and Andrew Hodges.

No.	Title	Length
1.	"Natural Wonders Every Child Should Know"	7:38
2.	"He Dreamed of Machines"	6:06
3.	"The Enigma"	4:59
4.	"Other Ranks"	4:36
5.	"The Memory and the Control"	4:27
6.	"The Trial"	7:09
7.	"Only in His Death"	5:43
8.	"A Man from the Future"	7:08
Total length:		47:46

Notes

- All track titles are stylised in sentence case.
- Physical releases of the album come with a second disc of instrumental versions of all eight tracks.

== Personnel ==
Personnel are adapted from "The Making of 'A Man from the Future'".

Pet Shop Boys

- Chris Lowe – original programming, keyboards
- Neil Tennant – original programming, keyboards, vocals

Additional performers

- Juliet Stevenson – narration
- Manchester Camerata Octet
  - 1st violins: Coco Inman, Tom Aldren
  - 2nd violins: Rebecca Thompson, Will Newell
  - Violas: Alex Mitchell, Rachel Jones
  - Celli: Colin Alexander, Graham Morris
- Manchester Grammar School Choir
- Robert Carey – choir conductor
- Abimbola Amoako-Gyampah – backing vocals
- Senab Adekunle – backing vocals
- Dawn Joseph – backing vocals
- Joell Fender – backing vocals

Technical personnel

- Sven Helbig – production, string arrangement, vocal arrangement
- Pet Shop Boys – production
- Maarten Vos – additional production, programming, synthesisers
- Brendan Williams – strings and choir recording
- Pete Gleadall – vocals recording
- Olsen Involtini – mixing
- Zino Mikorey – mastering
- Mark Farrow – album design

== Charts ==
Chart performance for A Man from the Future
Chart (2026)	Peak position
Australian Albums (ARIA)	22
Austrian Albums (Ö3 Austria)	21
Belgian Albums (Ultratop Flanders)	16
Belgian Albums (Ultratop Wallonia)	4
Croatian International Albums (HDU)	2
Danish Vinyl Albums (Hitlisten)	23
Dutch Albums (Album Top 100)	85
French Albums (SNEP)	169
German Albums (Offizielle Top 100)	8
German Pop Albums (Offizielle Top 100)	5
Greek Albums (IFPI)	46
Hungarian Albums (MAHASZ)	5
Italian Physical Albums (FIMI)	17
Japanese Western Albums (Oricon)	30
Scottish Albums (Official Charts)	8
Swiss Albums (Schweizer Hitparade)	12
UK Albums (Official Charts)	19
