= Brian Carpenter (engineer) =

British internet engineer

Brian Edward Carpenter
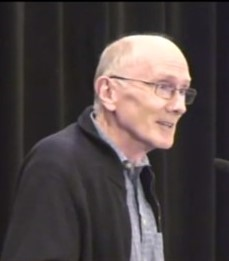
- Carpenter (2013)
- Born: 30 May 1946 (age 80); Leicester, England
- Education: Cambridge University; University of Manchester
- Occupation: Honorary academic
- Known for: Internet protocols, IPv6, differentiated services

Brian Edward Carpenter (born 30 May 1946) is a British Internet engineer and a former chair of the Internet Engineering Task Force (IETF), the Internet Architecture Board (IAB), and the Internet Society.

== Early life and education ==
Carpenter was born in Leicester, England, and was educated at the Wyggeston Grammar School for Boys in Leicester. He earned a master's degree in physics from Downing College at Cambridge University, and MSc and PhD degrees in computer science from The University of Manchester.

== Professional career ==
Carpenter (2013)

Carpenter spent 25 years, from 1971 to 1996, working at the European Laboratory for Particle Physics (CERN). He initially wrote software for process control systems and later served as the head of the networking group from 1985 to 1996, working alongside Robert Cailliau and Tim Berners-Lee, who invented the World Wide Web. He took three years off of his CERN career to teach undergraduate computer science at Massey University in New Zealand.

When Carpenter left CERN, he joined IBM, where he was an IBM Distinguished Engineer working on Internet Standards and Technology between 1997 and 2007. From 1999 to 2001 he was at iCAIR, international Center for Advanced Internet Research, sponsored by IBM at Northwestern University in Evanston, Illinois. Upon leaving iCAIR, he was based in Switzerland, first in Zurich, then Geneva.

In September 2007, Carpenter left IBM for academia, teaching data communication at the University of Auckland, from 2007 until his retirement in 2012. After his retirement, he spent a year as a visiting professor at the Computer Laboratory of Cambridge University. Since then he has been an honorary academic at The University of Auckland and a consultant for Huawei Technologies Co. Ltd.

In 2013, Carpenter published a professional memoir called Network Geeks: How They Built the Internet.

== Contributions to Internet technology ==
Carpenter's research interests include Internet protocols, especially the networking and routing layers. He is also interested in the history of computing.

Carpenter served from March 1994 to March 2002 on the Internet Architecture Board, which he chaired for five years. In 1996, he edited an important memo on the Architectural Principles of the Internet. He has worked on IPv6 and on differentiated services and served as the DiffServ working group chair. He also served as a Trustee of the Internet Society, and was Chairman of its Board of Trustees for two years until June 2002. In March 2005, he became IETF Chair, a position he held until March 2007.

== Selected publications ==
- Brian Carpenter; Robert W. Doran (1977). "The Other Turing Machine". The Computer Journal. 20 (3). British Computer Society: 269–279. doi:10.1093/comjnl/20.3.269.
- AM Turing's ACE Report of 1946 and Other Papers, Vol. 10 of Charles Babbage Institute Reprint Series for the History of Computing, B.E. Carpenter, R.W. Doran (eds), MIT Press, 1986.
- Network Geeks: How They Built the Internet. Springer Science & Business Media. 2013. ISBN 9781447150251.
- "Turing’s Zeitgeist", B.E. Carpenter, R.W. Doran, Chapter 22 in The Turing Guide, Jack Copeland et al. (eds.), ISBN 978-0-19-874783-3, Oxford University Press, 2017, pp 223–231.

Preceded by Harald Tveit Alvestrand	IETF Chair; 2005–2007	Succeeded by Russ Housley
