= Fred Baker (engineer) =

American engineer (1952–2025)

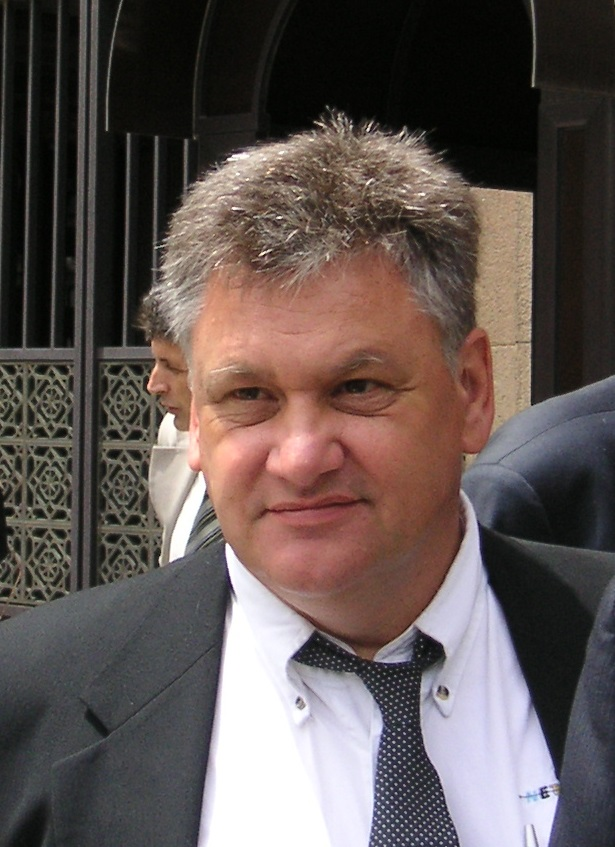
- Born: Frederick Juergens Baker; February 28, 1952; Cleveland, Ohio, U.S.
- Died: June 18, 2025 (aged 73); San Diego, California, U.S.
- Occupations: Engineer, IETF chair
- Spouse: Sally Baker

Frederick J. Baker (February 28, 1952 – June 18, 2025) was an American engineer, specializing in developing computer network protocols for the Internet.

== Life and career ==
Baker attended the New Mexico Institute of Mining and Technology from 1970 to 1973. He worked in the field of computer network technology, starting in 1978 at Control Data Corporation (CDC), Vitalink Communications Corporation, and Advanced Computer Communications.

He joined Cisco Systems in 1994. He became a Cisco Fellow in 1998, working in university relations and as a research ambassador, and in the IETF. He left Cisco Systems in 2016.

From 1989 until his death, Baker was involved with the Internet Engineering Task Force (IETF), the body that develops standards for the Internet. He chaired a number of IETF working groups, including several that specified the management information bases (MIB) used to manage network bridges and popular telecommunications links. He served as IETF chair from 1996 to 2001, when he was succeeded by Harald Tveit Alvestrand.

Baker served on the Internet Architecture Board from 1996 through 2002. He co-authored or edited over fifty Request for Comments (RFC) documents on Internet protocols and contributed to others. The subjects covered included network management, Open Shortest Path First (OSPF) and Routing Information Protocol (RIPv2) routing, quality of service (using both the Integrated services and Differentiated Services models), Lawful Interception, precedence-based services on the Internet, and others.

In 1994, Baker became one of the founding members of the Board of Directors for the Internet Systems Consortium. In addition, he served as a member of the Board of Trustees of the Internet Society 2002 through 2008, and as its chair from 2002 through 2006. He was a member of the Technical Advisory Council of the US Federal Communications Commission from 2005 through 2009.

He worked as liaison to other standards organizations such as the ITU-T. In 2009, he became chair of the RFC Series Oversight Committee.

He co-chaired the IPv6 Operations Working Group in the IETF, represented the IETF on the National Institute of Standards and Technology Smart Grid Smart Grid Interoperability Panel and Architecture Committee (until 2013), and was Cisco's representative to a Broadband Internet Technical Advisory Group. Baker also had several patents.

Baker was chair and co-chair of the ICANN Root Server System Advisory Committee (RSSAC) from October 2018 to December 2022.

Baker died on June 18, 2025, at the age of 73.

| Preceded by Paul Mockapetris | IETF Chair; 1996–2001 | Succeeded by Harald Tveit Alvestrand |
