= Smolt =

Smolt may refer to:

- one of the stages in the life cycle of a juvenile salmon, when it is preparing to live in salt water
- Smolt (Linux), a project aimed at hardware information collection
