= Xiaoming Sun =

Chinese chemist and materials scientist

- 孙晓明
- Born: 1976 (age 49–50)
- Education: Tsinghua University (BS, PhD)
- Known for: Gas-superwetting nanoarray electrodes for electrocatalysis
- Scientific career
- Fields: Electrocatalysis, nanomaterials, hydrogen energy
- Workplaces: Beijing University of Chemical Technology
- Doctoral advisor: Yadong Li
- Other academic advisors: Hongjie Dai (postdoctoral)

Xiaoming Sun (Chinese: 孙晓明; born 1976) is a Chinese chemist and materials scientist and a professor at Beijing University of Chemical Technology (BUCT). He is known for proposing gas-superwetting (superaerophobic and superaerophilic) nanoarray electrodes for gas-involving electrocatalysis. He received the National Science Fund for Distinguished Young Scholars in 2011 and has been named a Highly Cited Researcher by Clarivate for 2018–2023 and 2025.

== Early life and education ==
Sun was born in Shandong Province in February 1976. He earned his Bachelor of Science in 2000 and his Ph.D. in 2005, both in chemistry from Tsinghua University, where his doctoral advisor was Yadong Li. From 2005 to 2008, he was a postdoctoral researcher in the Department of Chemistry at Stanford University, working with Hongjie Dai.

== Career ==
In 2008, Sun joined BUCT as a professor at the State Key Laboratory of Chemical Resource Engineering. He served as Executive Vice Dean of the School of Energy at BUCT around 2018. Sun is deputy editor-in-chief of Science Bulletin and serves on the editorial board of Nano Research, and is executive chairman of the Youth Committee and deputy chairman of the Hydrogen Energy Committee of the China Renewable Energy Society.

== Research ==
Sun's research focuses on water electrolysis, interface engineering of gas-superwetting electrodes, and aqueous batteries.

=== Gas-superwetting electrodes ===
Sun proposed the concept of gas-superwetting electrodes—surfaces engineered to be either superaerophobic (gas-repellent) or superaerophilic (gas-attracting) at the nanoscale—to improve bubble management in electrochemical reactions. His group's early work showed that underwater superaerophobic molybdenum disulfide (MoS₂) nanostructured electrodes could enhance the hydrogen evolution reaction by facilitating bubble release. A 2018 review in Accounts of Chemical Research discussed the design principles of superwetting electrodes and their applications in water electrolysis and fuel cells.

=== Seawater electrolysis ===
Sun's group works on direct seawater electrolysis for hydrogen production. In 2019, collaborating with Hongjie Dai, they reported a solar-driven system for sustained splitting of seawater into hydrogen and oxygen. In 2021, the group reported a chlorine-free hybrid seawater splitting system coupled with hydrazine degradation for energy-saving hydrogen production. In 2025, Sun's team, collaborating with Bin Liu's group at City University of Hong Kong, reported 10,000-hour stable intermittent alkaline seawater electrolysis, addressing cathode degradation under fluctuating renewable power supply with a NiCoP–Cr₂O₃ cathode.

=== Aqueous batteries ===
Sun's group has also developed electrode materials for aqueous batteries, reporting a layered double hydroxide cathode for aqueous zinc-ion batteries (2022) and polymerized melamine catalysts for high-capacity Zn–I_{2} batteries (2025).

== Awards and honors ==
- Elsevier Highly Cited Scholar in China (Materials Science), 2014–2017
- Technical Invention Award (First Prize), China Renewable Energy Society ("Key materials and technologies for seawater electrolysis hydrogen production"), 2022
- Highly Cited Researcher, Clarivate, 2018–2023 and 2025
