= Simon Greenish =

Simon Greenish is a British civil engineer and museum director.

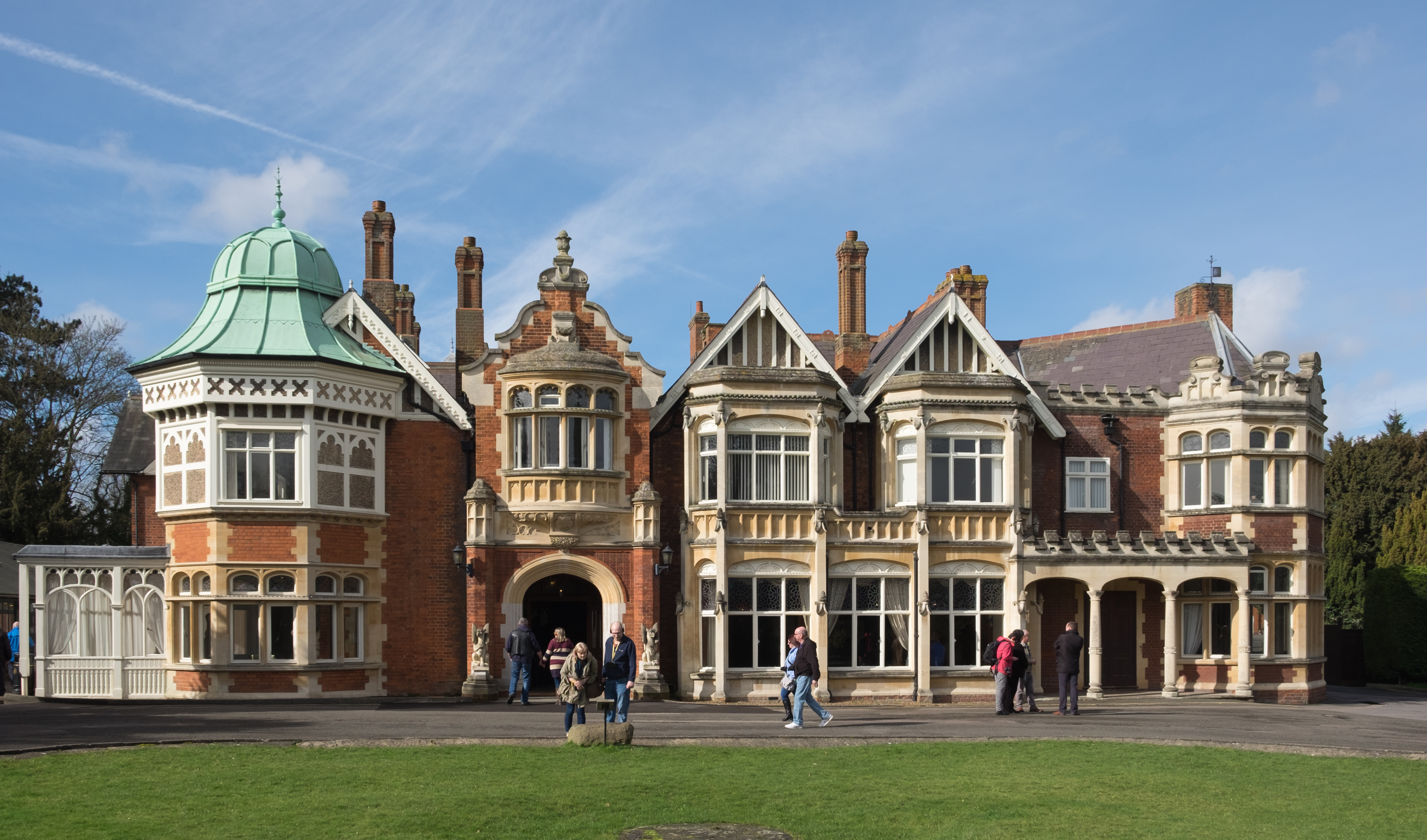
The mansion at Bletchley Park, where Simon Greenish was Director from 2006 to 2012

Greenish studied engineering at Durham University, graduating with a third in 1971.

In 1995, Greenish joined the Royal Air Force Museum as project manager under its Director General, who was embarking on a £30 million development. In 2005, he became Director of Collections at the museum. In 2006, he was appointed Director of Bletchley Park when it was in financial difficulties. He led the initiative to make the Bletchley Park Trust financially secure and raise the awareness of the importance of the site as part of Britain's heritage. He helped to raise £10 million to restore the Bletchley Park site and retired from his post in 2012, to be succeeded by Iain Standen. In 2017, he contributed a chapter to The Turing Guide on recent developments at Bletchley Park.

Greenish was appointed to an MBE in 2013 for services to English Heritage. He also has an honorary degree from the University of Bedfordshire. He currently resides in Felmersham, Bedfordshire.
