= Code: The Hidden Language of Computer Hardware and Software =

1999 book by Charles Petzold

- Author: Charles Petzold
- Subject: Computer architecture, computer science
- Publisher: Microsoft Press
- Publication date: 29 September 1999
- Pages: 393
- ISBN: 978-0735605053
- Website: www.charlespetzold.com/code

Code: The Hidden Language of Computer Hardware and Software (1999) is a book by Charles Petzold that seeks to teach how personal computers work at a hardware and software level. In the preface to the 2000 softcover edition, Petzold wrote that his goal was for readers to understand how computers work at a concrete level that "just might even rival that of electrical engineers and programmers" and that he "went as far back" as he could go in regard to the history of technological development. Petzold describes Code as being structured as moving "up each level in the hierarchy" in which computers are constructed. On June 10, 2022, Petzold announced that an expanded second edition would be published later that year. The second edition was released on July 28, 2022, along with an interactive companion website (www.codehiddenlanguage.com) developed by Petzold.

The idea of writing the book came to him in 1987 while writing a column called "PC Tutor" for PC Magazine.

== Chapter outline ==
1. Best Friends
2. Codes and Combinations
3. Braille and Binary Codes
4. Anatomy of a Flashlight
5. Communicating Around Corners
6. Logic with Switches
7. Telegraphs and Relays
8. Relays and Gates
9. Our Ten Digits
10. Alternatives 10s
11. Bit by Bit by Bit
12. Bytes and Hexadecimal
13. From ASCII to Unicode
14. Adding with Logic Gates
15. Is This for Real?
16. But What About Subtraction?
17. Feedback and Flip-Flops
18. Let's Build a Clock!
19. An Assemblage of Memory
20. Automating Arithmetic
21. The Arithmetic Logic Unit
22. Registers and Buses
23. CPU Control Signals
24. Loops, Jumps, and Calls
25. Peripherals
26. The Operating System
27. Coding
28. The World Brain

== Content ==
Petzold begins Code by discussing older technologies like Morse code, Braille, and Boolean logic, which he uses to explain vacuum tubes, transistors, and integrated circuits. Code is notable for its explanations of historical technologies in order to build the pieces for further understanding. Electricity is explained through the example of a basic flashlight, which is then expanded upon through the explanation of the electrical telegraph. He noted that "very smart people" had to go down the "dead ends" of mechanical computers and decimal computing before reaching a scalable solution—namely, the electronic, binary computer with a von Neumann architecture. The book also covers more recent developments, including topics like floating point math, operating systems, and ASCII.

The book focuses on "pre-networked computers" and does not cover concepts like distributed computing because Petzold thought that it would not be as useful for "most people using the Internet", his intended audience. Specifically, he said in an interview that his "main hope" in writing Code was to impart upon his readers a "really good feeling for what a bit is, and how bits are combined to convey information".

== Reception ==
Software engineer and blogger Jeff Atwood described Code as a "love letter to the computer".

Publishers Weekly, shortly after Code's publication, said "Initial response, at least among traditional tech book readers, has been positive" and quotes the book's editor, Ben Ryan, as saying "We're trying to cross the boundary of the computer section, and break out Code as general nonfiction science". It also praises both the quality of the physical book and the style of the writing as easy to read and understand.

Ryan Holihan, writing for Input, calls Code "excellent" and that "it is, by far, the most straightforward way of explaining the earth shattering power humans can wield when working with 1s and 0s", in a brief but positive review.

Code has been included in the syllabi of post-secondary education technical courses, such as "Fundamentals of Modern Software" where it was called "a little dated, but it is a really clear and incredibly accessible presentation of how computers get from electrical currents flowing down wires to programs you can actually use" and other introductory and mid-level computer science and engineering courses.

== See also ==
- Algorithms + Data Structures = Programs – 1976 computer science book by Niklaus Wirth
- Bit
- Computer memory
- History of computing hardware
