= Internet Research Task Force =

Internet governance organization

- Abbreviation: IRTF
- Purpose: Promoting research into the evolution of the Internet.
- Region served: Worldwide
- IRTF Chair: Dirk Kutscher
- Parent organization: Internet Architecture Board
- Website: irtf.org

The Internet Research Task Force (IRTF) is an organization, overseen by the Internet Architecture Board, that focuses on longer-term research issues related to the Internet. A parallel organization, the Internet Engineering Task Force (IETF), focuses on the shorter term issues of engineering and standards making.

The IRTF promotes research of importance to the evolution of the Internet by creating focused, long-term research groups working on topics related to Internet protocols, applications, architecture and technology. Unlike the IETF, the task force does not set standards and there is no explicit outcome expected of IRTF research groups.

== Organization ==
The IRTF is composed of a number of focused and long-term research groups. These groups work on topics related to Internet protocols, applications, architecture and technology. Research groups have the stable long-term membership needed to promote the development of research collaboration and teamwork in exploring research issues. Participation is by individual contributors, rather than by representatives of organizations. The list of current groups can be found on the IRTF's homepage.

== Operations ==
The IRTF is managed by the IRTF chair in consultation with the Internet Research Steering Group (IRSG). The IRSG membership includes the IRTF chair, the chairs of the various Research Groups and other individuals (members at large) from the research community selected by the IRTF chair. The chair of the IRTF is appointed by the Internet Architecture Board (IAB) for a two-year term.

These individuals have chaired the IRTF:

- David D. Clark, 1989–1992
- Jon Postel, 1992–1995
- Abel Weinrib, 1995–1999
- Erik Huizer, 1999–2001
- Vern Paxson, 2001–2005
- Aaron Falk, 2005–2011
- Lars Eggert, 2011–2017
- Allison Mankin, 2017–2019
- Colin Perkins, 2019–2025
- Dirk Kutscher, 2025–present

The IRTF chair is responsible for ensuring that research groups produce coherent, coordinated, architecturally consistent and timely output as a contribution to the overall evolution of the Internet architecture. In addition to the detailed tasks related to research groups outlined below, the IRTF chair may also from time to time arrange for topical workshops attended by the IRSG and perhaps other experts in the field.

The RFC Editor publishes documents from the IRTF and its research groups on the IRTF stream.

=== IRSG ===
The IRTF is managed by the IRTF chair in consultation with the Internet Research Steering Group (IRSG). The IRSG membership includes the IRTF chair, the chairs of the various IRTF research groups and other individuals (members at large) from the research or IETF communities. IRSG members at large are chosen by the IRTF chair in consultation with the rest of the IRSG and on approval by the Internet Architecture Board.

In addition to managing the research groups, the IRSG may from time to time hold topical workshops focusing on research areas of importance to the evolution of the Internet, or more general workshops to, for example, discuss research priorities from an Internet perspective.

The IRSG also reviews and approves documents published as part of the IRTF document stream.

== See also ==
- Internet studies
- IRTF (disambiguation)
