= IRTF =

IRTF may refer to:

- Internet Research Task Force, a research organization working on topics related to the evolution of the Internet
- NASA Infrared Telescope Facility, an infrared telescope in Hawaii
- Intensive Residential Treatment Facility, a facility for youth who require an intensive, out-of-home treatment intervention
