= The Annotated Turing =

Book by Charles Petzold

The Annotated Turing: A Guided Tour Through Alan Turing’s Historic Paper on Computability and the Turing Machine
- Author: Charles Petzold
- Language: English
- Subject: Mathematics and computing
- Genre: Non-fiction
- Publisher: John Wiley & Sons
- Publication date: 2008
- Media type: Print (paperback)
- Pages: 372
- ISBN: 978-0-470-22905-7
- OCLC: 2008022829
- Dewey Decimal: 511.3/52 22
- LC Class: QA267 .P48

The Annotated Turing: A Guided Tour Through Alan Turing's Historic Paper on Computability and the Turing Machine is a book by Charles Petzold, published in 2008 by John Wiley & Sons, Inc.

Petzold annotates Alan Turing's paper "On Computable Numbers, with an Application to the Entscheidungsproblem". The book takes readers sentence by sentence through Turing's paper, providing explanations, further examples, corrections, and biographical information.

== Table of contents ==
- Part I. Foundations
  - Chapter 1: This Tomb Holds Diophantus
  - Chapter 2: The Irrational and the Transcendental
  - Chapter 3: Centuries of Progress
- Part II. Computable Numbers
  - Chapter 4: The Education of Alan Turing
  - Chapter 5: Machines at Work
  - Chapter 6: Addition and Multiplication
  - Chapter 7: Also Known as Subroutines
  - Chapter 8: Everything is a Number
  - Chapter 9: The Universal Machine
  - Chapter 10: Computers and Computability
  - Chapter 11: Of Machines and Men
- Part III. Das Entscheidungsproblem
  - Chapter 12: Logic and Computability
  - Chapter 13: Computable Functions
  - Chapter 14: The Major Proof
  - Chapter 15: The Lambda Calculus
  - Chapter 16: Conceiving the Continuum
- Part IV. And Beyond
  - Chapter 17: Is Everything a Turing Machine?
  - Chapter 18: The Long Sleep of Diophantus

== See also ==
- Alan Turing: The Enigma (1983)
- Prof: Alan Turing Decoded (2015)
- The Turing Guide (2017)
