= Nano Research =

- Discipline: Nanotechnology
- Language: English
- Edited by: Yadong Li, Shoushan Fan

Publication details
- History: 2008–present
- Publisher: Tsinghua Press/Springer Science+Business Media
- Frequency: Monthly
- License: Hybrid
- Impact factor: 9.5 (2023)

Standard abbreviations
- ISO 4: Nano Res.

Indexing
- CODEN: NRAEB5
- ISSN: 1998-0124 (print); 1998-0000 (web)
- LCCN: 2012211077

Links
- Journal homepage

Nano Research is a peer-reviewed scientific journal co-published by Tsinghua Press and Springer Science+Business Media. It covers research in all areas of nanotechnology. It was established in 2008 and is published monthly. The current editors-in-chief are Yadong Li and Shoushan Fan.

== Abstracting and indexing ==
The journal is indexed and abstracted in the following bibliographic databases:

- Biological Science Database
- Compendex
- Health Research Premium Collection
- INSPEC
- Materials Science & Engineering Collection
- Natural Science Collection
- Pharma Collection
- Science Citation Index Expanded
- Scopus
- Technology Collection

According to the Journal Citation Reports, the journal has a 2023 impact factor of 9.5. According to Scopus, it has a CiteScore of 14.3, ranking 17/434 in the category "Condensed Matter Physics".
