= Carl Posy =

Israeli philosopher

Carl Jeffrey Posy (Hebrew: קרל פוזי) is an Israeli philosopher. He is a full professor emeritus in the Department of Philosophy at the Hebrew University of Jerusalem in Jerusalem, Israel.

Carl Posy received his PhD degree from Yale University in the United States in 1971.

== Publications ==
Posy's areas of research interest include the philosophy of mathematics, philosophical logic, the history of philosophy (particularly Kant and his predecessors). His publications include:

- Kant’s Philosophy of Mathematics: Modern Essays, Springer, 1992. ISBN 978-0-7923-1495-0
- Computability: Turing, Gödel, Church, and Beyond (with Jack Copeland and Oron Shagrir), MIT Press, 2013. ISBN 978-0262527484.

Posy is a former Academic Director of the National Library of Israel.
