= Oron Shagrir =

Israeli philosopher

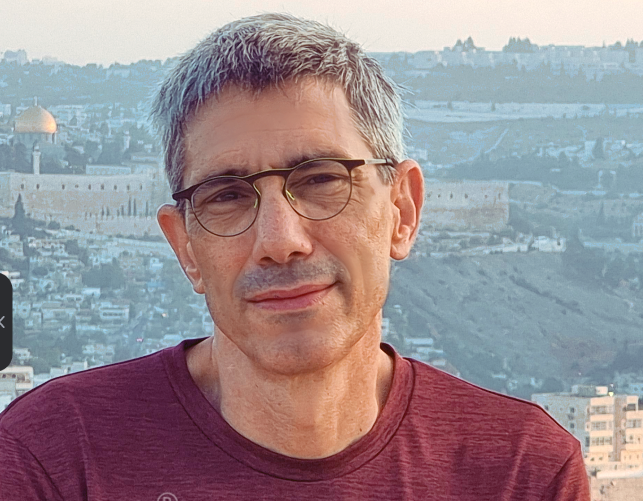
Shagrir in 2021

Oron Shagrir (Hebrew: אורון שגריר; born 1961) is an Israeli philosopher and cognitive scientist.

== Biography and work ==
Oron Shagrir is the Schulman Chair of Philosophy and a professor of philosophy and of cognitive and brain sciences at the Hebrew University of Jerusalem.

Shagrir received a BSc degree in mathematics and computer science and then an MA degree in Philosophy of Science (supervised by Itamar Pitowsky) from the Hebrew University of Jerusalem. He then received a PhD degree in philosophy and cognitive science from the University of California, San Diego, in the United States in 1995, having been supervised by Patricia Churchland.

Oron Shagrir has been the Vice Rector (2013–2017) and then Vice President (2017 onwards) for international affairs at the Hebrew University of Jerusalem. Shagrir was also the head of the Cognitive Science department in the university.

Shagrir's areas of research interest include the conceptual foundations of (mainly computational) cognitive and brain sciences, the history and philosophy of computing and computability, and "supervenience". His publications include:

- Computability: Turing, Gödel, Church, and Beyond (with Jack Copeland and Carl Posy), MIT Press, 2013. ISBN 978-0262527484.
- A special journal issue on the history of modern computing (with Jack Copeland, Carl Posy, and Parker Bright, The Rutherford Journal), 2010.

Shagrir is on the editorial boards of The Rutherford Journal and the Springer book series Studies in Brain and Mind. In 2017, Shagrir contributed to The Turing Guide.

== Family ==
He was born to Micha Shagrir and Aliza Shagrir. His mother was murdered during the 1980 Paris synagogue bombing while on Sukkot vacation and passing by the assaulted rue Copernic synagogue. He has a brother, Hagai.

He is married to Iris Shagrir.

== Awards and honours ==
2024: Barwise Prize
