= Harald Tveit Alvestrand =

Norwegian computer scientist

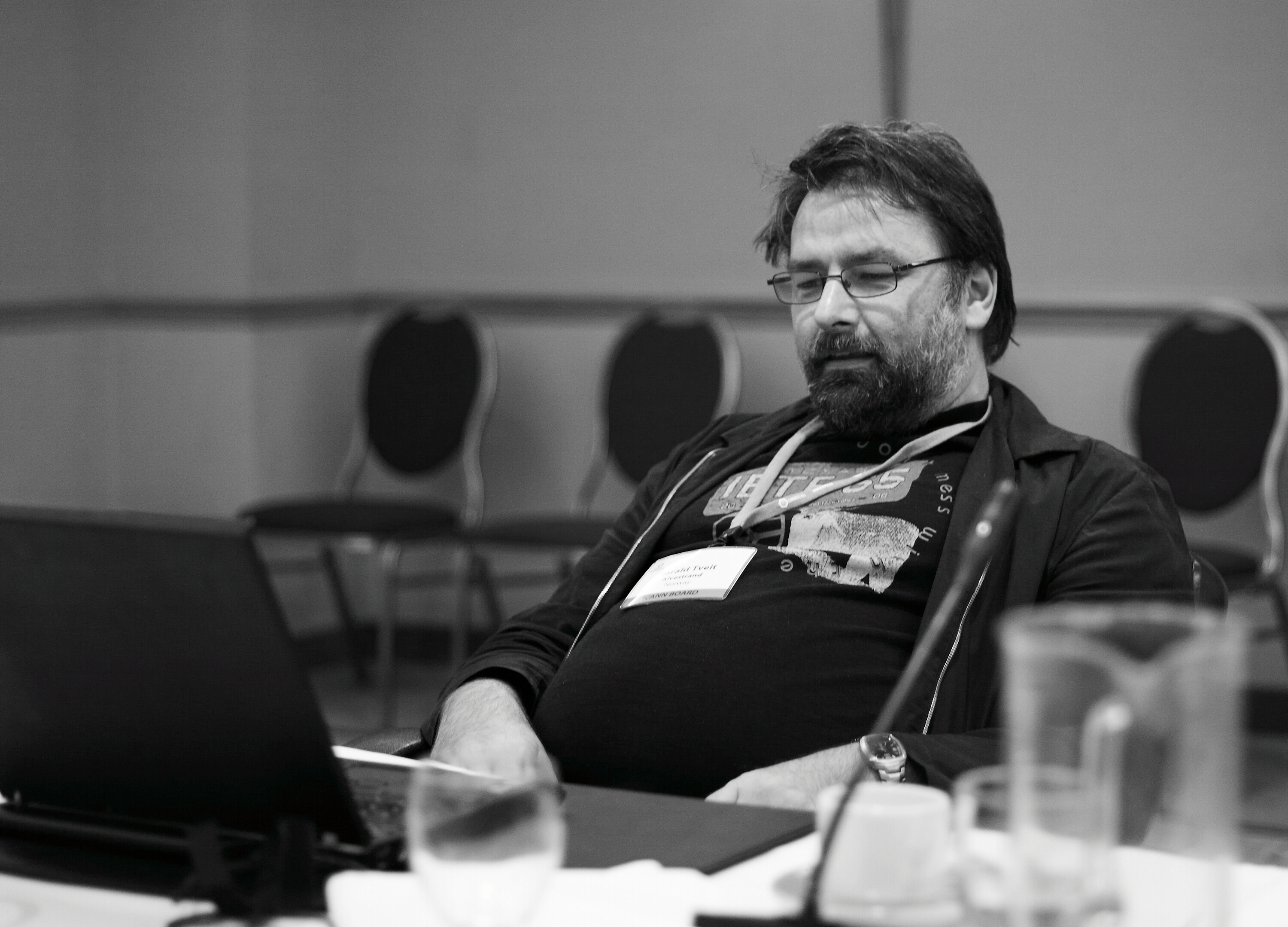
- Born: 29 June 1959 (age 67); Namsos, Norway
- Occupation: computer scientist
- Known for: i18n, IETF, and Linux work
- Notable work: RFC 2277 (BCP 18)
- Children: 3
- Website: www.alvestrand.no

Harald Tveit Alvestrand (born 29 June 1959) is a Norwegian computer scientist. He was chair of the Internet Engineering Task Force (IETF) from 2001 until 2005, succeeding Fred Baker. Within the IETF, Alvestrand was earlier the chair of the Areas for Applications from 1995 until 1997, and of Operations and Management in 1998.

== Biography ==
Alvestrand was born in Namsos, Norway, received his education from Bergen Cathedral School and the Norwegian Institute of Technology, and has worked for Norsk Data, UNINETT, EDB Maxware, Cisco Systems, and Google.

He is an author of several important Request for Comments (RFCs), many in the general area of Internationalization and localization, most notable the documents required for interoperability between SMTP and X.400. Since the start of the use of OIDs he has run a front end to the hierarchy of assignments according to X.208.

At the end of 2007 Alvestrand was selected for the ICANN Board, where he remained until December 2010. In 2001 he became a member of the Unicode Board of Directors. He was a co-chair of the IETF EAI and USEFOR WGs.

Harald Alvestrand was the executive director of the Linux Counter organization. He was a member of the Norid Board, and the RFC Independent Submissions Editorial Board. As of 2008 he lived in Trondheim, Norway, and has been working for Google since 2006.

== Publications ==
=== Best Current Practices ===
- RFC 2148 – "Deployment of the Internet White Pages Service," Best Current Practice 15.
- RFC 2277 – "IETF Policy on Character Sets and Languages," Best Current Practice 18.
- RFC 5226 – "Guidelines for Writing an IANA Considerations Section in RFCs," Obsolete, was BCP 26. Obsoleted by RFC 8126. Obsoletes RFC 2434.
- RFC 2438 – "Advancement of MIB specifications on the IETF Standards Track," Best Current Practice 27.
- RFC 1766 – "Tags for the Identification of Languages," Obsolete. Obsoleted by RFC 3066 and 3282.
- RFC 3066 – "Tags for the Identification of Languages," Obsolete, was BCP 47. Obsoleted by RFC 4646 and 4647.
- RFC 3932 – "The IESG and RFC Editor Documents: Procedures," Obsolete, was BCP 92. Obsoleted by RFC 5742. Updates RFC 3710 and 2026.
- RFC 3935 – "A Mission Statement for the IETF," Best Current Practice 95.

=== Other important RFCs ===
- RFC 1502 – "X.400 Use of Extended Character Sets," Historic.
- RFC 2130 – "The Report of the IAB Character Set Workshop held 29 February - 1 March, 1996," Informational. This memo prepared the UTF-8 50-years plan in RFC 2277.
- RFC 2157 – "Mapping between X.400 and RFC-822/MIME Message Bodies," Proposed Standard.
- RFC 3282 – "Content Language Headers," Proposed Standard.
- RFC 4450 – "Getting Rid of the Cruft: Report from an Experiment in Identifying and Reclassifying Obsolete Standards Documents," Informational.
- RFC 5242 – "A Generalized Unified Character Code: Western European and CJK Sections," Informational. This is an April Fools' Day Request for Comments. (With co-author John Klensin.)

Preceded by Fred Baker	IETF Chair; 2001–2005	Succeeded by Brian Carpenter
