= Linux Counter =

Web service of statistics about usage and spread of Linux

- Company type: Non-profit
- Dissolved: December 10, 2018; 7 years ago
- Owner: Linux Counter Project
- Founder: Harald Tveit Alvestrand
- Commercial: no
- Launched: 1993; 33 years ago

The Linux Counter was a website that attempted to estimate the number of people and machines using the Linux operating system. It ran from 1993 until December 2018. The last available estimate of Linux users was 91.9 million, as of August 2017. Since at least October 2021, the domain name points to a link aggregation website.

== History ==
The Linux Counter was started "for fun" with the goal to estimate the number of Linux users there are worldwide. The project invited users to register themselves as being a Linux user and then used various statistical heuristics to estimate the number of Linux users who did not register and the total number of Linux users worldwide. The project initially tracked the number of Linux users, but later extended to statistics on Linux users, the machines they use, software they use and in what part of the world Linux users actually lived. A second purpose of the Linux Counter was to help Linux users to find each other. The Linux Counter was reporting Linux users in almost any place in the world. If Linux users set their information to be public, one could easily find those users; Linux users could, for example, find other Linux users who lived somewhere near them.

The counter was run by a nonprofit organization called the Linux Counter Project. The organization was created on 1 May 1999, taking over the running of the counter from Harald Tveit Alvestrand, who had been running the project since 1993. In 1999, the project received wide technical media coverage, which led to it being slashdotted. Linux Today reported how Microsoft Austria used the site for spamming Linux users; the counter kept a list of press references, occasionally updated.

In 2011, it was taken over by Christin Löhner (then Alexander Mieland), who did a complete rewrite of the code. The code was published on GitHub in March 2015.

On 10 December 2018, Christin made a post on her personal blog announcing that she would no longer maintain the project, due to lack of time, lack of help and lack of interest as indicated by few to no new registrations or machines.

At the end of 2020, Benjamin Marwell contacted Christin Löhner and asked to revive the project. They agreed to create a completely new application in VueJS. Since January 1, 2021, they have worked together on a new linuxcounter/unixcounter project, with progress visible on GitHub.

The domain name was subsequently acquired by a third party. By October 2021, the domain hosted a link aggregation and advertising website operated by FB Commercials B.V., a Dutch Dutch private limited liability company (besloten vennootschap) headquartered in Baarn. According to the Netherlands Chamber of Commerce (Kamer van Koophandel) (KVK), the company is an Internet advertising agency and Internet entrepreneurship company. The company operates a backlink brokerage, Linksmarkt, in Dutch and English. The company is also listed as a carpentry business with the registered trade name Van den Bor Timmerwerken.

== See also ==
- Smolt
