= Micha Shagrir =

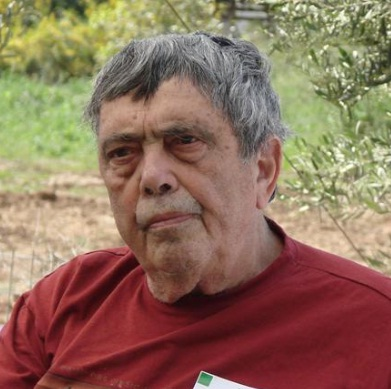
Micha Shagrir, 2014

Micha Shagrir (Hebrew: מיכה שגריר; November 1, 1937 – February 4, 2015) was an Israeli film director, producer, radio presenter, and journalist. He produced feature and documentary films and TV shows.

He was the head of Kastel Productions, a co-founder of the Sam Spiegel Film and Television School, Jerusalem, and a chairman of the Israel Film Foundation.

== Biography ==
Micha Shagrir was born in Linz, Austria as Josef Michael Schwager. (Among other films, Shagrir made a documentary Linz. Bischofstrasse 7 about the street in Linz where his family lived.) His father Karl Schwager emigrated to Mandatory Palestine in 1921, where he lived in kibbutz Heftziba and where he met Micha Shagrir's mother, Vally (Yehudit). She already had a son Chaim, from her recently deceased husband Georg Grünwald. They returned to Austria in 1932 or 1933, but immediately after the Nazi's Anschluss, in April 1938 they emigrated to Palestine. At first they lived in Heftziba, later in Tel Aviv and Holon. Later Micha lived in other places. In 1949 the family changed their surname to Shagrir (which means "ambassador" in Hebrew). The father took the name Hanan, and the mother Yehudit

Micha Shagrir graduated from the Hebrew University of Jerusalem.

== Family ==
Micha Shagrir was married to Aliza Shagrir (née Levi) in Jerusalem in 1961. She was murdered during the 1980 Paris synagogue bombing while on Sukkot vacation and passing by the assaulted rue Copernic synagogue. They had two sons, Oron and Hagai. Micha Shagrir established the Aliza Shagrir Foundation in her memory, for awarding young documentary filmmakers.

== Awards ==
- 1999: Honorary Fellow of the Sam Spiegel Film and Television School
- 2005: Jerusalem Film Festival Life Achievement Award
- Israeli Film Academy's Life Achievement Award
- 2008: Gold Medal of Honour of the City of Linz
- 2009: Culture Medal of Upper Austria

== Filmography ==
Shagrir directed and produced over 250 documentaries, television and feature films.

- 1967: Sayarim (Scouting Patrol) (feature film, director), about a squad that infiltrated across the border to capture a wanted terrorist (based on a real story)
- 1969: The War After the War (full-length documentary, director)
