= Internet Engineering Task Force =

Open internet standards organization

- Abbreviation: IETF
- Formation: January 1986
- Type: Non-profit; Standards organization
- Purpose: Creating voluntary standards to maintain and improve the usability and interoperability of the Internet
- Parent organization: Internet Society
- Website: ietf.org

The Internet Engineering Task Force (IETF) is a standards organization for the Internet responsible for the technical standards of the Internet protocol suite (TCP/IP). It has no formal membership roster or requirements and all its participants are volunteers. Their work is usually funded by employers or other sponsors.

The IETF was initially supported by the federal government of the United States but since 1993 has operated under the auspices of the Internet Society, an American non-profit organization with local chapters around the world.

== Organization ==
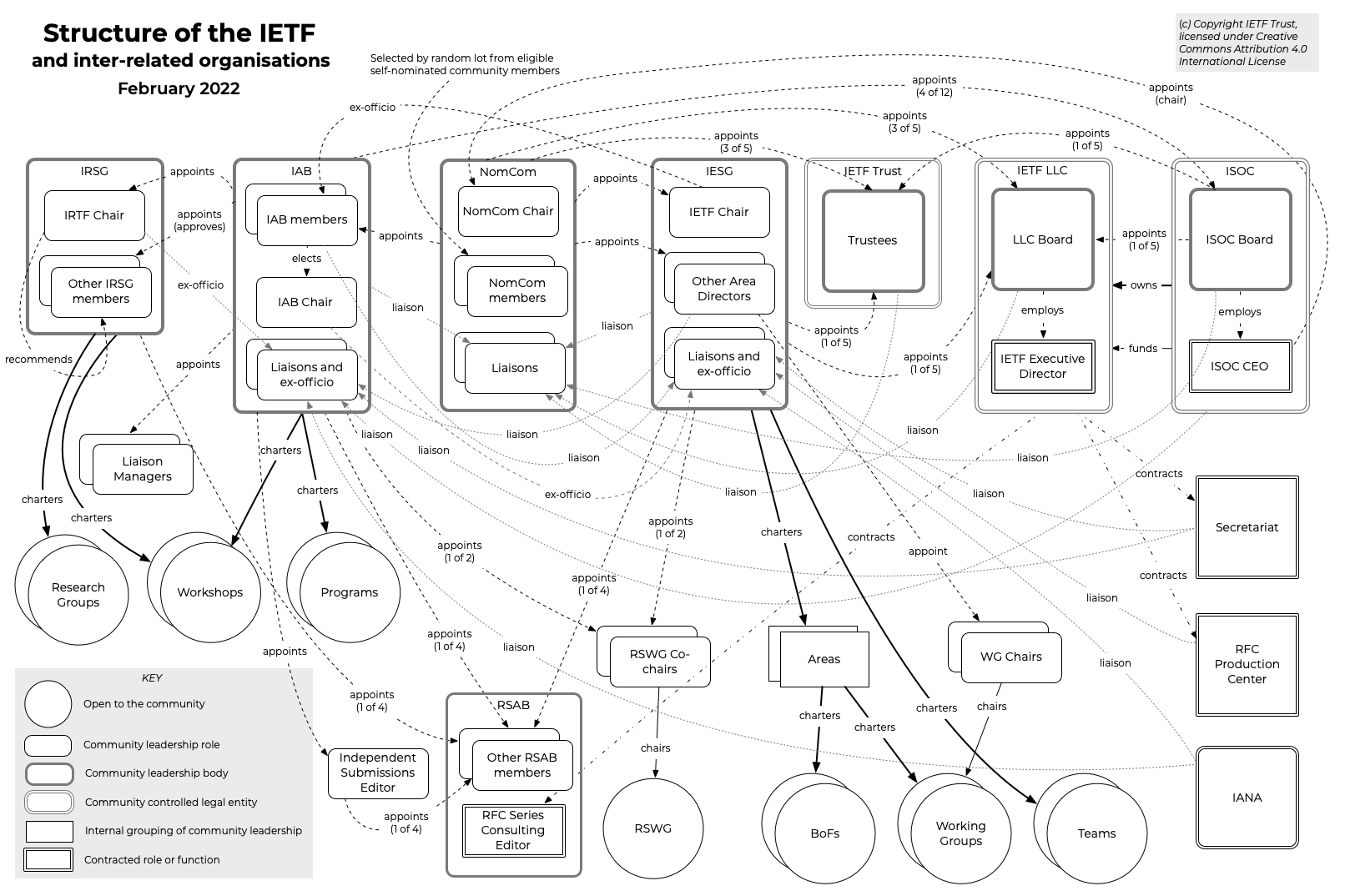
Governance structure of the IETF.

There is no membership in the IETF. Anyone can participate by signing up for a working group mailing list or registering for an IETF meeting.

The process for developing IETF standards is open and all-inclusive. Anyone can participate by joining a working group and attending meetings. Each working group normally has appointed two co-chairs (occasionally three); a charter that describes its focus, what it is expected to produce, and when. It is open to all who want to participate and holds discussions on an open mailing list. Working groups hold open sessions at IETF meetings, where the onsite registration fee in 2026 (14 Nov 2026 - 20 Nov 2026) was between US$950 (early registration) and $1,300 per person for the week. Significant discounts are available for students and remote participants. As working groups do not make decisions at IETF meetings, with all decisions taken later on the working group mailing list, meeting attendance is not required for contributors.

Rough consensus is the primary basis for decision making. There are no formal voting procedures. Each working group is intended to complete work on its topic and then disband. In some cases, the working group will instead have its charter updated to take on new tasks as appropriate.

The working groups are grouped into areas by subject matter. Each area is overseen by an area director (AD), with most areas having two ADs. The ADs are responsible for appointing working group chairs. The area directors, together with the IETF Chair, form the Internet Engineering Steering Group (IESG), which is responsible for the overall operation of the IETF.

The Internet Architecture Board (IAB) oversees the IETF's external relationships. The IAB provides long-range technical direction for Internet development. The IAB also manages the Internet Research Task Force (IRTF), with which the IETF has a number of cross-group relations.

A nominating committee (NomCom) of ten randomly chosen volunteers who participate regularly at meetings, a non-voting chair and 4 or 5 liaisons, is vested with the power to appoint, reappoint, and remove members of the IESG, IAB, IETF Trust and the IETF LLC. To date, no one has been removed by a NomCom, although several people have resigned their positions and require replacements.

In 1993, the IETF changed from an activity supported by the US federal government to an independent, international activity associated with the Internet Society, a US-based 501(c)(3) organization. In 2018, the Internet Society created a subsidiary, the IETF Administration LLC, to be the corporate, legal and financial home for the IETF. IETF activities are funded by meeting fees, meeting sponsors and by the Internet Society via its organizational membership and the proceeds of the Public Interest Registry.

In December 2005, the IETF Trust was established to manage the copyrighted materials produced by the IETF. In 2026 the IETF Trust transferred its materials, trademarks, domain names, and IANA intellectual property to the Intellectual Property Management Corporation (IPMC), and archived the IETF Trust website.

=== Steering group ===
The Internet Engineering Steering Group (IESG) is a body composed of the Internet Engineering Task Force (IETF) chair and area directors. It provides the final technical review of Internet standards and is responsible for day-to-day management of the IETF. It receives appeals of the decisions of the working groups, and the IESG makes the decision to progress documents in the standards track.

The chair of the IESG is the area director of the general area, who also serves as the overall IETF chair. Members of the IESG include the two directors, sometimes three, of each of the following areas:

- Applications and real-time (art)
- General (gen)
- Internet (int)
- Operations and management (ops)
- Routing (rtg)
- Security (sec)
- Web and Internet transport (wit)

Liaison and ex officio members include:

- IETF executive director ASPF
- IAB chair
- Appointed liaison from the IAB
- Liaison from the Internet Assigned Numbers Authority (IANA)
- Liaison from the Request for Comments (RFC) editor

== Early leadership and administrative history ==
The Gateway Algorithms and Data Structures (GADS) Task Force was the precursor to the IETF. Its chairman was David L. Mills of the University of Delaware.

In January 1986, the Internet Activities Board (IAB; now called the Internet Architecture Board) decided to divide GADS into two entities: an Internet Architecture (INARC) Task Force chaired by Mills to pursue research goals, and the IETF to handle nearer-term engineering and technology transfer issues. The first IETF chair was Mike Corrigan, who was then the technical program manager for the Defense Data Network (DDN). Also in 1986, after leaving DARPA, Robert E. Kahn founded the Corporation for National Research Initiatives (CNRI), which began providing administrative support to the IETF.

In 1987, Corrigan was succeeded as IETF chair by Phill Gross.

Effective March 1, 1989, but providing support dating back to late 1988, CNRI and NSF entered into a cooperative agreement, No. NCR-8820945, wherein CNRI agreed to create and provide a "secretariat" for the "overall coordination, management and support of the work of the IAB, its various task forces and, particularly, the IETF".

In 1992, CNRI supported the formation and early funding of the Internet Society, which took on the IETF as a fiscally sponsored project, along with the IAB, the IRTF, and the organization of annual INET meetings. Gross continued to serve as IETF chair throughout this transition. Cerf, Kahn, and Lyman Chapin announced the formation of ISOC as "a professional society to facilitate, support, and promote the evolution and growth of the Internet as a global research communications infrastructure". At the first board meeting of the Internet Society, Cerf, representing CNRI, offered, "In the event a deficit occurs, CNRI has agreed to contribute up to USD$102,000 to offset it." In 1993, Cerf continued to support the formation of ISOC while working for CNRI, and the role of ISOC in "the official procedures for creating and documenting Internet Standards" was codified in the IETF's RFC 1602.

In 1995, IETF's RFC 2031 describes ISOC's role in the IETF as being purely administrative, and ISOC as having "no influence whatsoever on the Internet Standards process, the Internet Standards or their technical content".

In 1998, CNRI established Foretec Seminars, Inc. (Foretec), a for-profit subsidiary to take over providing secretariat services to the IETF. Foretec provided these services until at least 2004. By 2013, Foretec was dissolved.

In 2003, IETF's RFC 3677 described IETFs role in appointing three board members to the ISOC's board of directors.

In 2018, ISOC established The IETF Administration LLC, a separate LLC to handle the administration of the IETF. In 2019, the LLC issued a call for proposals to provide secretariat services to the IETF.

== Meetings ==
The first IETF meeting was attended by 21 US federal government-funded researchers on 16 January 1986. It was a continuation of the work of the earlier GADS Task Force. Representatives from non-governmental entities (such as gateway vendors) were invited to attend starting with the fourth IETF meeting in October 1986. Since that time, all IETF meetings have been open to the public.

Initially, the IETF met quarterly, but from 1991, it has been meeting three times a year. The initial meetings were very small, with fewer than 35 people in attendance at each of the first five meetings. The maximum attendance during the first 13 meetings was only 120 attendees. This occurred at the twelfth meeting, held during January 1989. These meetings have grown in both participation and scope a great deal since the early 1990s; it had a maximum attendance of 2810 at the December 2000 IETF held in San Diego, California. Attendance declined with industry restructuring during the early 2000s, and is currently around 1200.

The locations for IETF meetings vary greatly. A list of past and future meeting locations is on the IETF meetings page. The IETF strives to hold its meetings near where most of the IETF volunteers are located. IETF meetings are held three times a year, with one meeting each in Asia, Europe and North America. An occasional exploratory meeting is held outside of those regions in place of one of the other regions.

The IETF also organizes hackathons during the IETF meetings. The focus is on implementing code that will improve standards in terms of quality and interoperability.

=== Birds of a feather ===
In an IETF context, BoF (birds of a feather) can refer to:

- An informal discussion group. Unlike special interest groups or working groups, BoFs are informal and often formed in an ad hoc manner. The acronym is used by the IETF to denote initial meetings of members interested in a particular issue.
- A BoF session is an informal meeting at conferences, where the attendees group together based on a shared interest and carry out discussions without any pre-planned agenda.

The first use of this term among computer specialists is uncertain, but it was employed during DECUS conferences and may have been used at SHARE user group meetings in the 1960s.

BoFs can facilitate networking and partnership formation among subgroups, including functionally oriented groups such as CEOs or geographically oriented groups. BoFs generally allow for more audience interaction than the panel discussions typically seen at conventions; the discussions are not completely unguided, though, as there is still a discussion leader.

The term is derived from the proverb "birds of a feather flock together". The (idiomatic) phrase birds of a feather means "people having similar characters, backgrounds, interests, or beliefs". In old poetic English, birds of a feather means birds that have the same kind of feathers, so the proverb refers to the fact that birds congregate with birds of their own species.

== Operations ==
The details of IETF operations have changed considerably as the organization has grown, but the basic mechanism remains publication of proposed specifications, development based on the proposals, review and independent testing by participants, and republication as a revised proposal, a draft proposal, or eventually as an Internet Standard. IETF standards are developed in an open, all-inclusive process in which any interested individual can participate. All IETF documents are freely available over the Internet and can be reproduced at will. Multiple, working, useful, interoperable implementations are the chief requirement before an IETF proposed specification can become a standard. Most specifications are focused on single protocols rather than tightly interlocked systems. This has allowed the protocols to be used in many different systems, and its standards are routinely reused by bodies which create full-fledged architectures (e.g. 3GPP IMS).

Because it relies on volunteers and uses "rough consensus and running code" as its touchstone, results can be slow whenever the number of volunteers is either too small to make progress or so large as to make consensus difficult, or when volunteers lack the necessary expertise. For protocols like SMTP, which is used to transport e-mail for a user community in the many hundreds of millions, there is also considerable resistance to any change that is not fully backward compatible, except for IPv6. Work within the IETF on ways to improve the speed of the standards-making process is ongoing but, because the number of volunteers with opinions on it is very great, consensus on improvements has been slow to develop.

The IETF cooperates with the W3C, ISO/IEC, ITU, and other standards bodies.

Statistics are available that show who the top contributors by RFC publication are. While the IETF only allows for participation by individuals, and not by corporations or governments, sponsorship information is available from these statistics.

=== Criticism ===
In 2025, criticism intensified within the IETF that intelligence agencies were exerting undue influence, sparking concerns on a lack of transparency in the decision-making process.

== Chairs ==
The IETF chairman is selected by the NomCom process for a two-year renewable term. Before 1993, the IETF Chair was selected by the IAB.

A list of the past and current chairs of the IETF:

- Mike Corrigan (1986)
- Phill Gross (1986–1994)
- Paul Mockapetris (1994–1996)
- Fred Baker (1996–2001)
- Harald Tveit Alvestrand (2001–2005)
- Brian Carpenter (2005–2007)
- Russ Housley (2007–2013)
- Jari Arkko (2013–2017)
- Alissa Cooper (2017–2021)
- Lars Eggert (2021–2024)
- Roman Danyliw (2024–)

== Topics of interest ==
The IETF works on a broad range of networking technologies that provide the foundation for the Internet's growth and evolution.

=== Automated network management ===
It aims to improve the efficiency in management of networks as they grow in size and complexity. The IETF is also standardizing protocols for autonomic networking that enable networks to be self managing.

=== Internet of things ===
It is a network of physical objects or things that are embedded with electronics, sensors, software and also enables objects to exchange data with operator, manufacturer and other connected devices. Several IETF working groups are developing protocols that are directly relevant to IoT.

=== New transport technology ===
Its development gives internet applications the ability to send data over the Internet. There are some transport protocols such as TCP (Transmission Control Protocol) and UDP (User Datagram Protocol), which are continuously getting extended and refined to meet the demands of the global Internet.

=== Generic Security Service API ===
The IETF defines a "Generic Security Services Application Programming Interface" (GSSAPI) which provides security services to callers in a generic fashion.

Among these are various implementations. Java provides these features in its standard library package org.ietf.jgss.*.

== See also ==
- Internet governance
- Open space technology
- Unconference
