= Tsinghua University Press =

University Press of Tsinghua University

- Parent company: Tsinghua University
- Status: Active
- Founded: 1980; 46 years ago
- Country of origin: China
- Headquarters location: Beijing
- Distribution: Worldwide
- Publication types: Books, E-books, and Journals
- Fiction genres: Mostly non-fiction
- No. of employees: Over 400
- Official website: tup.tsinghua.edu.cn

Tsinghua University Press
- Simplified Chinese: 清华大学出版社
- Traditional Chinese: 清華大學出版社
Transcriptions
Standard Mandarin
- Hanyu Pinyin: Qīnghuá Dàxué Chūbǎnshè

Tsinghua University Press (TUP; Chinese: 清华大学出版社) is the publishing house of Tsinghua University in Beijing, China. It was established in June 1980.

According to Publishers Weekly in 2015, TUP releases "3,000 new titles and 20 journals" annually.

Since 2022, the SciOpen publishing platform, provides free access to TUP journals.

== Books ==
The following books have been published by Tsinghua University Press:

- Mao Zedong and 20th Century China (2020)
- The Turing Guide (2023)
