= Charles Petzold =

American computer programmer

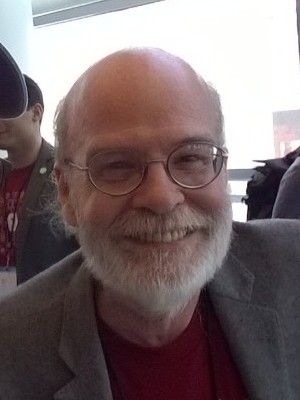
- Born: February 2, 1953 (age 73); New Brunswick, New Jersey
- Education: Stevens Institute of Technology
- Employer: Xamarin (2014-2018)
- Spouse: Deirdre Sinnott
- Website: www.charlespetzold.com

Charles Petzold (born February 2, 1953) is an American programmer and technical author on Windows applications. He is also a Microsoft Most Valuable Professional and was named one of Microsoft's seven Windows Pioneers.

== Biography ==
Petzold graduated with a Master of Science in Mathematics from Stevens Institute of Technology in 1975. Aside from writing books about Windows programming, he has contributed to various magazines about computers.

He had an interest in electronic music and in 1977 started building electronic music instruments out of CMOS chips. In 1979, Petzold started building a computer-controlled digital electronic music synthesizer based on the Zilog Z80 microprocessor. This experience of digital circuitry and assembly language programming formed the basis of his book Code: The Hidden Language of Computer Hardware and Software.

Petzold purchased an IBM PC with two floppy disk drives in 1984 for $5,000. The debt encouraged him to use the computer to earn some revenue, so he wrote an article about ANSI.SYS and the PROMPT command. He submitted it to PC Magazine for which they paid $800. This was the beginning of Petzold's career as a paid writer.

In 1984, PC Magazine decided to do a review of printers. They asked all current New York contributors to help with the review. Petzold showed the staff some small assembly-language programs he had written. Soon he was busy writing 300-500 byte .COM file utilities for PC Magazine.

Petzold was soon getting so much freelance work from PC Magazine that he was able to quit his job.

Microsoft then decided that Microsoft Systems Journal would cover both MS-DOS and Windows programming. Jonathan Lazarus, who contracted with Microsoft, recruited Petzold to write some articles. Petzold wrote the article A Step-by-Step Guide to Building Your First Windows Application" for MSJ, Vol.1, No. 2 (December 1986) which he believes was the first article about Windows programming to appear in a magazine.

Petzold told some people at a Microsoft-related function that he really enjoyed writing this type of article. This news was relayed to Microsoft Press editor-in-chief Susan Lammers. This resulted in Petzold being contracted to write the first edition of Programming Windows from January until August 1987.

== Bibliography ==
- Creating Mobile Apps with Xamarin.Forms Cross-platform C# programming for iOS, Android, and Windows Phone (Microsoft Press, 2016, 1166 pages)
- Programming Windows Sixth Edition Writing Windows 8 Apps with C# and XAML (Microsoft Press, 2012, 1136 pages)
- Programming Windows Phone 7 Series (Microsoft Press, 2010) (free download)
- The Annotated Turing: A Guided Tour through Alan Turing's Historic Paper on Computability and the Turing Machine (Wiley, 2008)
- 3D Programming for Windows - Three-Dimensional Graphics Programming for the Windows Presentation Foundation (Microsoft Press, 2007)
- .NET Book Zero What the C or C++ Programmer Needs to Know about C# and the .NET Framework (free download)
- Applications = Code + Markup - A Guide to the Microsoft Windows Presentation Foundation (Microsoft Press, 2006)
- Programming Microsoft Windows Forms (Microsoft Press, 2005; 384 pages)
- Programming in the Key of C#: A Primer for Aspiring Programmers (Microsoft Press, 2003; 418 pages)
- Programming Microsoft Windows with C# (Microsoft Press, 2001; 1290 pages)
- Code: The Hidden Language of Computer Hardware and Software (Microsoft Press, 1999; 393 pages. Second edition: 2022, 480 pages)
- Programming Windows, Fifth Edition (Microsoft Press, 1998; 1479 pages)

=== Out-of-print books ===
- Programming Microsoft Windows with Microsoft Visual Basic .NET (Microsoft Press, 2002; 1303 pages)
- Programming Windows 95, 4th edition (Microsoft Press, 1996; 1100 pages)
- Programming the OS/2 Presentation Manager (Microsoft Press, 1989)
- Programming Windows 3.1, 3rd edition (Microsoft Press, 1992; 983 pages)
- Programming Windows, 2nd edition. (Microsoft Press, 1990)
- Programming the OS/2 Presentation Manager (Ziff-Davis Press, 1994; 934 pages)
- Programming Windows, 1st edition (Microsoft Press, 1988; 852 pages)

=== Books that were never published ===
- Graphics Programming in Windows
- The OS/2 Graphics Programming Interface

=== Contributor ===
- Contributor to Beautiful Code: Leading Programmers Explain How They Think, edited by Andy Oram & Greg Wilson (O'Reilly, 2007)
- Contributor to Extending DOS, edited by Ray Duncan (2nd edition, Addison Wesley, 1992)
- Contributor to Microsoft Press Computer Dictionary (Microsoft Press, 1991)
- Contributor to Extending DOS, edited by Ray Duncan (Addison Wesley, 1990)
- Contributor to The MS-DOS Encyclopedia, edited by Ray Duncan (Microsoft Press, 1988)

=== Magazines ===
- PC Magazine
  - Contributing Editor (1985 to 2005)
  - PC Tutor column (1985 to 1987)
  - Environments column (1987 to 1995)
- Microsoft Systems Journal
  - Contributing Editor (1987 to 2000)
- Windows Sources
  - Contributing Editor and Columnist (1993)
- MSDN Magazine
  - Contributing Editor (2000 to 2014)

== Online articles ==
- Maxwell, Molecules, and Evolution
- How Far from True North are the Avenues of Manhattan?
- Articles for MSDN magazine
