= Smolt (Linux) =

Computer program

Smolt was a computer program used to gather hardware information from computers running Linux, and submit them to a central server for statistical purposes, quality assurance and support. It was initiated by Fedora, with the release of Fedora 7, and soon after it was a combined effort of various Linux projects. Information collection was voluntary (opt-in) and anonymous. Smolt did not run automatically. It requested permission before uploading new data to the Smolt server. On October 10, 2012, it was announced that smolt would be discontinued on November 1, 2013. That is now in effect. The Smolt webpage is no longer available.

The project is superseded by Hardware probe.

== General ==
Before Smolt there was no widely accepted system for assembling Linux statistics in one place. Smolt was not the first nor the only attempt, but it is the first accepted by major Linux distributions.

Collecting this kind of data across distributions can:

- aid developers in detecting hardware that is poorly supported
- focus efforts on popular hardware
- provide workaround and fix tips
- help users to choose the best distribution for their hardware
- convince hardware vendors to support Linux

== Use ==
Smolt was included in:

- Fedora
- openSUSE, releases from 11.1 to 12.2;
- RHEL and CentOS see https://web.archive.org/web/20090109010205/http://download.fedora.redhat.com/pub/epel/ (retired link)
- Gentoo see https://web.archive.org/web/20090207100254/http://packages.gentoo.org/package/app-admin/smolt
- MythTV see http://smolt.mythtv.org/

== Smolt server ==
The Smolt server stored all collected data.

== See also ==
- Linux Counter
