= Andrew Hodges =

British mathematician and author (born 1949)

- Born: Andrew Philip Hodges; 1949 (age 76–77); London, England
- Education: Birkbeck, University of London (PhD)
- Known for: Alan Turing: The Enigma
- Scientific career
- Fields: Mathematics; Twistor theory
- Workplaces: University of Oxford
- Thesis: The Description of Mass within the Theory of Twistors (1975)
- Doctoral advisor: Roger Penrose
- Website: www.synth.co.uk

Andrew Philip Hodges (/ˈhɒdʒɪz/ HOJ-iz; born 1949) is a British mathematician, author and emeritus senior research fellow at Wadham College, Oxford.

== Education ==
Hodges was born in London in 1949 and educated at Birkbeck, University of London, where he was awarded his Doctor of Philosophy degree in 1975 for research on twistor theory supervised by Roger Penrose.

== Career and research ==
Since the early 1970s, Hodges has worked on twistor theory, which is the approach to the problems of fundamental physics pioneered by Roger Penrose. He was also involved in the gay liberation movement during the 1970s.

Hodges is best known as the author of Alan Turing: The Enigma, his biography of the British computer pioneer and codebreaker Alan Turing. The book was critically acclaimed when it was first published in 1983, with Donald Michie in New Scientist calling it "marvellous and faithful". In June 2002, it was chosen by Michael Holroyd for inclusion in a list of 50 "essential" books (available in print at the time) in The Guardian.

Alan Turing: The Enigma formed the basis of Hugh Whitemore's 1986 stage play Breaking the Code, which was adapted for television in 1996, with Derek Jacobi as Turing. The book was later made into the 2014 film The Imitation Game directed by Morten Tyldum, starring Benedict Cumberbatch as Alan Turing. The script for The Imitation Game won Graham Moore an Oscar for Best Adapted Screenplay at the 87th Academy Awards in 2015.

Hodges is also the author of works that popularise science and mathematics.

He is an emeritus tutorial fellow in mathematics at Wadham College, Oxford. Having taught at Wadham since 1986, Hodges was elected a Fellow in 2007, and was appointed Dean of Wadham College from the start of the 2011/2012 academic year.

In 2014, he joined the Pet Shop Boys on stage at the Royal Albert Hall for a standing ovation following the world premiere of A Man from the Future at The Proms.

=== Publications ===
- With Downcast Gays: Aspects of Homosexual Self-Oppression,
- Alan Turing: The Enigma
- One to Nine: The Inner Life of Numbers
