= Internet Architecture Board =

American Internet Society advisory body

The Internet Architecture Board (IAB) is a committee of the Internet Engineering Task Force (IETF) and an advisory body of the Internet Society (ISOC). Its responsibilities include architectural oversight of IETF activities, Internet Standards Process oversight and appeal, and the appointment of the Request for Comments (RFC) Editor. The IAB is also responsible for the management of the IETF protocol parameter registries.

== History ==
The body which eventually became the IAB was originally the Internet Configuration Control Board (ICCB). It was created by Vint Cerf in 1979 while he was working at the Defense Advanced Research Projects Agency (DARPA) of the United States Department of Defense.

In 1983, the ICCB was reorganized by Barry Leiner, Cerf's successor at DARPA, around a series of task forces considering different technical aspects of internetting. The re-organized group was named the Internet Activities Board (IAB).

The IAB set for itself seven principal foci for the period of 1989 to 1990. These were namely:

- Operational Stability
- User Services
- OSI Coexistence
- Testbed Facilities
- Security
- Getting Big
- Getting Fast

It finally became the Internet Architecture Board, under ISOC, in January 1992, as part of the Internet's transition from a U.S.-government entity to an international, public entity.

== Responsibilities ==
The IAB is responsible for:

- Providing architectural oversight of Internet protocols and procedures
- Liaising with other organizations on behalf of the Internet Engineering Task Force (IETF)
- Reviewing appeals of the Internet standards process
- Managing Internet standards documents (the RFC series) and protocol parameter value assignment
- Confirming the Chair of the IETF and the IETF Area Directors
- Selecting the Internet Research Task Force (IRTF) Chair
- Acting as a source of advice and guidance to the Internet Society.

In its work, the IAB strives to:

- Ensure that the Internet is a trusted medium of communication that provides a solid technical foundation for privacy and security, especially in light of pervasive surveillance,
- Establish the technical direction for an Internet that will enable billions more people to connect, support the vision for an Internet of things, and allow mobile networks to flourish, while keeping the core capabilities that have been a foundation of the Internet's success, and
- Promote the technical evolution of an open Internet without special controls, especially those that hinder trust in the network.

== Activities ==
Activities of the IAB include:

Workshops

- COVID-19 Network Impacts Workshop, 2020
- Exploring Synergy between Content Aggregation and the Publisher Ecosystem Workshop 2019
- Design Expectations vs. Deployment Reality in Protocol Development Workshop 2019
  - Position Papers: DEDR Workshop
- Explicit Internet Naming Systems (EName) Workshop 2017
- Internet of Things Software Update Workshop (IoTSU) 2016
  - IoT Semantic Interoperability Workshop 2016
- Managing Radio Networks in an Encrypted World (MaRNEW) Workshop 2015
- Coordinating Attack Response at Internet Scale (CARIS) Workshop 2015
  - Call For Papers
  - Agenda: Coordinating Attack Response at Internet Scale (CARIS) Workshop
- IAB Workshop on Stack Evolution in a Middlebox Internet (SEMI) 2015
- W3C/IAB workshop on Strengthening the Internet Against Pervasive Monitoring (STRINT) 2014
- IAB Workshop on Internet Technology Adoption and Transition (ITAT) 2013
- IAB / IRTF Workshop on Congestion Control for Interactive Real-Time Communication 2012
  - Workshop on Congestion Control: Position Papers
  - Congestion Control Workshop Agenda and Materials
- Interconnecting Smart Objects with the Internet Workshop 2011
  - Tutorial on Interconnecting Smart Objects with the Internet
  - Position Papers
  - Agenda
- Internet Privacy Workshop 2010
  - Slides Presentations
  - Minutes of the IAB/W3C/ISOC/MIT Internet Privacy Workshop
  - Meeting Minutes
  - Accepted Position Papers
- Routing and Addressing Workshop 2006
- Unwanted Traffic Workshop 2006
- IAB Wireless Internetworking Workshop 2000

Technical programs and administrative support groups

- RFC Editor Program: The RFC Series Oversight Committee (RSOC)
- RFC Editor Future Development Program
- Plenary Planning Program
- Internet Threat Model (model-t) Program
- IETF-IANA Group
  - Evolvability, Deployability, & Maintainability (EDM) Program
- Concluded Programs
  - Security Program
  - Privacy Program
  - Privacy Reviews
  - IPv6 Privacy Survey
  - Privacy and Security Program
  - Names and Identifiers Program
  - Liaison Oversight Program
  - ITU-T Coordination Program
  - IP Stack Evolution Program
  - IP Evolution
  - Internationalization Program
  - IETF Protocol Registries Oversight Committee (IPROC)
  - IAB Tools and Processes Program
  - Emergency Services

IAB appointments and confirmations

- Community Coordination Group (CCG): Russ Housley (2017–2021), Barry Leiba (2017–2021), Tim Wicinski (2018–2022)
- IANA Stewardship Transition Coordination Group (ICG): Russ Housley, Lynn St Amour
- ICANN Board of Directors Liaison: Harald Alvestrand: (2018–present)
- ICANN Root Zone Evolution Review Committee (RZERC): Tim (April, 2020–2021)
- ICANN NomCom: Peter Koch, 2020
- ICANN Technical Liaison Group (TLG) : Warren Kumari (2019–2021), Petr Špaček (2020–2022)

== Responsibilities ==
The IAB's current responsibilities include:

- Architectural Oversight: The IAB provides oversight of, and occasional commentary on, aspects of the architecture for the network protocols and procedures used by the Internet.
- Standards Process Oversight and Appeal: The IAB provides oversight of the process used to create Internet Standards. The IAB serves as an appeal board for complaints of improper execution of the standards process, through acting as an appeal body in respect of an Internet Engineering Steering Group (IESG) standards decision.
- Request for Comments series: The IAB is responsible for editorial management and publication of the Request for Comments (RFC) document series.
- Internet Assigned Numbers Authority: In conjunction with the Internet Corporation for Assigned Names and Numbers (ICANN), the IAB is responsible for the administration of the assignment of IETF protocol parameter values by the Internet Assigned Numbers Authority (IANA).
- External Liaison: The IAB acts as representative of the interests of the IETF in liaison relationships with other organizations concerned with standards and other technical and organizational issues relevant to the worldwide Internet.
- Advice to the Internet Society: The IAB acts as a source of advice and guidance to the board of trustees and Officers of ISOC concerning technical, architectural, procedural, and (where appropriate) policy matters pertaining to the Internet and its enabling technologies.
- Internet Engineering Steering Group Confirmation: The IAB confirms the IETF Chair and IESG Area Directors, from nominations provided by the IETF Nominating Committee.
- Internet Research Task Force Chair: The IAB selects a chair of the IRTF for a renewable two-year term.

== RFC1087 – Ethics and the Internet and a rise to modernity ==
The IAB takes a formal stance on what constitutes proper use of the Internet in their 1989 memo, RFC 1087: “Ethics and the Internet.” They introduce their contemporary version of the Internet, which at the time was in its nascent stages, serving primarily as a tool for communication of research in the scientific community, and identify the use of this internet as a “privilege.”

The IAB then proclaims as unethical any activity which:

- seeks to gain unauthorized access to the resources of the Internet,
- disrupts the intended use of the Internet,
- wastes resources (people, capacity, computer) through such actions,
- destroys the integrity of computer-based information
- compromises the privacy of users.

This memo was written at a time during which the Internet existed in the general research milieu, but since that time the Internet has evolved greatly and expanded its user base. The IAB has accordingly taken new stances on ethical and secure Internet use, such as in RFC 8890, where the IAB identifies protecting end users as the first priority in their maintenance of the Internet.

As such, though their core principles are the same, the IAB's priority for protection has shifted from the technical and scientific community to the community of day-to-day users. In another memo RFC7624, the IAB takes a firm stance against pervasive mass surveillance through the use of the Internet on the part of national intelligence agencies, saying that it is necessary that the Internet technical community, including itself, “address the vulnerabilities exploited [by mass surveillance campaigns]...to ensure that the Internet can be trusted by [its] users.”

== RFC 2850 - Charter of the Internet Architecture Board ==
RFC 2850 establishes the structure and purpose of the IAB. The RFC specifies the following:

- IAB membership: the IAB has 13 members, 1 being the chair of the Internet Engineering Task Force (IETF). These members are appointed to 2-year terms.
- The Role of the IAB: The IAB serves to provide Architectural Oversight for Internet procedures, and to provide oversight in the process of creating Internet standards, including appeals. Furthermore, the IAB acts as a liaison to the Internet Society (ISOC) to advise regarding architectural and technical issues.
- IAB Organization: The 13 members of the IAB choose 1 member to serve as the chair of the IAB for a 1-year term. There is no limit to the number of terms that the chair can serve. The executive director of the IAB is chosen by the chair. The IAB also has the power to designate the chair of the Internet Research Task Force (IRTF) for a 2-year term.
- Decision-making: in most situations, the IAB aims to come to unanimous decisions on matters. When this is not possible, the IAB must come to a consensus of at least 7 members before taking action.
- Openness and confidentiality: The IAB makes all meetings open to the public by making it available online, and also publishes RFCs regularly to make its conclusions generally available. In some situations, however, confidential information is excluded for privacy reasons.

== RFC 2026 - The Internet Standards Process ==
The Internet Standards process is an activity of the Internet Society that is organized and managed on behalf of the Internet community by the Internet Architecture Board (IAB) and the Internet Engineering Steering Group (IESG). The Internet Standards Process is concerned with all protocols, procedures, and conventions that are used in or by the Internet. The process of creating an Internet Standard is straightforward: a specification undergoes a period of development and several iterations of review by the Internet community and revision based upon experience, is adopted as a Standard by the appropriate body (either the IAB or the IESG), and is published. Each distinct version of an Internet standards-related specification is published as part of the "Request for Comments" (RFC) document series. This archival series is the official publication channel for Internet standards documents and other publications of the IESG, IAB, and Internet community. The complete Internet Standards Process is itself specified by an RFC, namely RFC 2026.

== RFC 8980 - Workshop on Design Expectations vs. Deployment Reality in Protocol Development ==
The RFC 8980 workshop was held in February 2021, where the IAB discussed several topics around security protocols, including:

- Email standards, which presumed many providers running in a largely uncoordinated fashion but have seen both significant market consolidation and a need for coordination to defend against spam and other attacks. The coordination and centralized defense mechanisms scale better for large entities; these have fueled additional consolidation.
- The Domain Name System (DNS), which presumed deep hierarchies but has often been deployed in large, flat zones, leading to the nameservers for those zones becoming critical infrastructure. Future developments in DNS may see concentration through the use of globally available common resolver services, which evolve rapidly and can offer better security. Paradoxically, the concentration of these queries into a few services creates new security and privacy concerns.
- The Web, which is built on a fundamentally decentralized design but is now often delivered with the aid of Content Delivery Networks (CDNs). Their services provide scaling, distribution, and prevention of denial of service in ways that new entrants and smaller systems operators would find difficult to replicate. While truly small services and truly large services may each operate using only their own infrastructure, many others are left with the only practical choice being the use of a globally available commercial service.

The workshop resulted in the following recommendations by the IAB:

- Develop and document a modern threat model.
- Continue discussion of consolidation/centralization issues.
- Document architectural principles, e.g., (re)application of the end-to-end principle.

== Chairs ==
The following people have served as chair of the IAB:

- David D. Clark – 1981 to July 1989
- Vint Cerf – July 1989 to July 1991
- Lyman Chapin – July 1991 to March 1993
- Christian Huitema – March 1993 to July 1995
- Brian Carpenter – July 1995 to March 2000
- John Klensin – March 2000 to March 2002
- Leslie Daigle – March 2002 to March 2007
- Olaf Kolkman – March 2007 to March 2011
- Bernard Aboba – March 2011 to March 2013
- Russ Housley- March 2013 to March 2015
- Andrew Sullivan – March 2015 to March 2017
- Ted Hardie – March 2017 to March 2020
- Mirja Kühlewind - March 2020 to March 2024
- Tommy Pauly - March 2024 to March 2026
- Dhruv Dhody - March 2026 to present

== Current members ==
Members	Background
Deborah Brungard	Deborah Brungard is a Lead Member of Technical Staff in Wireless and Access Technology at AT&T, where she has worked since 1984. She's been very active in the IETF's routing sector and has made many meaningful contributions there. She received a master's degree in electrical engineering from Stevens Institute of Technology.
Ben Campbell	Ben Campbell is an independent consultant and an IAB liaison to the Internet Engineering Steering Group. He's spent time at many different companies and organizations, most notably Oracle Communication, Tekelec, and Estacado Systems. He received his bachelor's degree and His MBA from Texas A&M University and now resides in Irving, Texas.
Jari Arkko	Jari Arkko is originally from Kauniainen, Finland, but now resides in Jorvas, Finland, where he is employed at Ericsson Research, a Swedish mobile equipment manufacturer. He has also served at the IETF as one of the Internet Area Directors in the Internet Engineering Steering Group.
Jiankang Yao	Jiankang Yao is a senior research engineer leading the team in charge of technology standardization at the China Internet Network Information Center. He received his master's degree in computer science from the University of Singapore and went on to receive a Ph.D. in Computer Software and Theory from the Chinese Academy of Sciences.
Lars Eggert	Lars Eggert is currently based in Helsinki, Finland, where he works as the Technical Director for Networking at NetApp. He has served on the Internet Engineering Task Force (IETF) for over two decades, including a stint as the chair of its research arm, the IRTF. He currently serves as the chair of the IETF. He received a Ph.D. in computer science from the University of Southern California and has previously served as the CTO at Nokia.
Wes Hardaker	Wes Hardaker is a computer scientist at USC's Information Sciences Institute (USC/ISI). He primarily researches Internet security and is currently leading two NSF-funded projects on DNS and DDoS attacks. He is also active within the IETF and ICANN.
Cullen Jennings	Cullen Jennings is a software development manager at Cisco Systems, where he builds collaboration systems used on the Internet. Cullen is also involved with discussions surrounding open source and internet standards.
Mirja Kühlewind	Mirja Kühlewind received her PhD in 2015 on Transmission Control Protocol (TCP) from the University of Stuttgart and now researches transport protocol evolution. Mirja also was selected as IETF Transport Area Director in 2016.
Zhenbin Li	Zhenbin Li received his bachelor's degree in Information and Communication Engineering from Xi’an Jiaotong University and his Master of Electronic Engineering from Tsinghua University. Now Zhenbin works as a network engineer and system architect for Huawei.
Jared Mauch	Jared was appointed to the IAB as a 2020-2021 candidate. He currently works for Akamai Technologies as a Network Architect. Past work includes founding White Box Optical Inc. and Washtenaw Fiber Properties LLC.
Tommy Pauly	Tommy was appointed to the IAB as a 2020-2021 candidate. He currently works for Apple on their networking stack for client operating systems, focusing on areas including secure transport protocols and APIs, VPNs, IPv6, and DNS. He currently co-chairs the HTTP and IPPM Working Groups. He received a BS in Computer Science and a BA in music, both from Stanford University.
David Schinazi	David Schinazi is an engineer at Google. He currently works primarily as the Chrome Tech Lead for QUIC and helps out with various standardization efforts at the IETF and W3C. Previously, David worked at Apple on many networking technologies at the heart of iOS, macOS, tvOS, and watchOS, including networking APIs, TCP, IPv6, IKEv2/IPsec, and routing protocols.
Russ White	Russ White began working with computers in the mid-1980s, and computer networks in 1990. He has experience in designing, deploying, breaking, and troubleshooting large-scale networks, and is a strong communicator from the whiteboard to the board room. He has co-authored more than forty software patents, participated in the development of several Internet standards, helped develop the CCDE and the CCAr, and worked in Internet governance with the Internet Society. Russ has a background covering a broad spectrum of topics, including radio frequency engineering and graphic design, and is an active student of philosophy and culture.

== Related organizations ==
- IETF Administration LLC - This organization provides legal advice for the IAB
- Request for Comments (RFC) Editor - The RFC series contains documents released by 4 organizations: The Internet Architecture Board (IAB), the Internet Engineering Task Force (IETF), the Internet Research Task Force (IRTF), and Independent Submissions
- Internet Assigned Numbers Authority (IANA)
- Internet Research Task Force (IRTF) - The IRTF works on long-term projects related to the Internet
- The IETF Trust - The IETF Trust holds intellectual property licensing and other licensing related to the Internet
- The Internet Society (ISOC)
