= Jack Copeland =

New Zealand (British born) philosopher, logician and historian of science

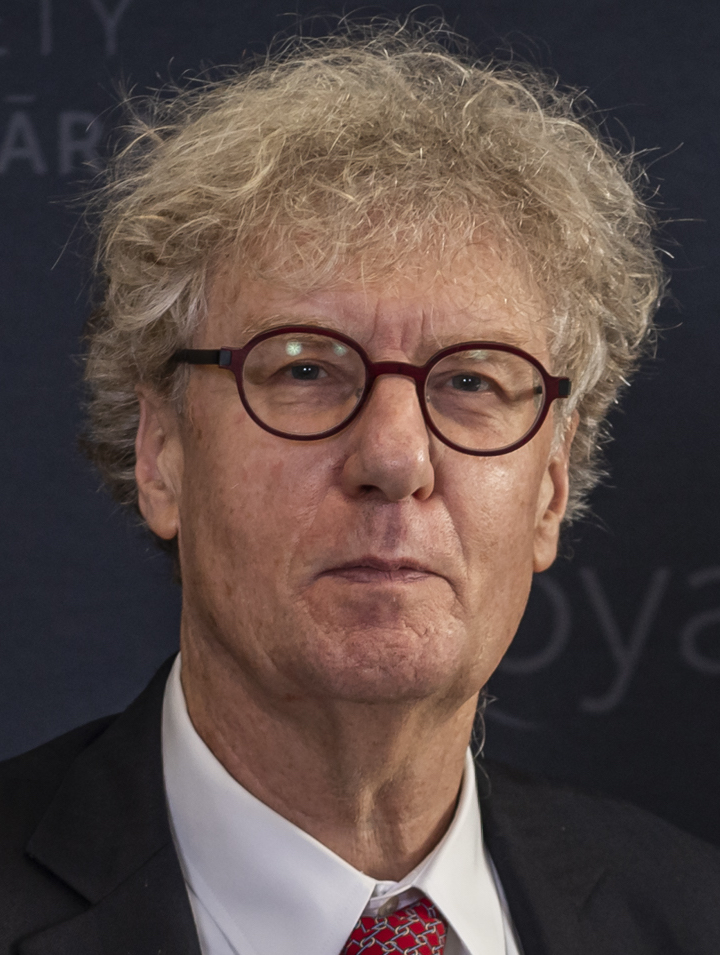
- Born: Brian Jack Copeland; 1950 (age 75–76); London, England
- Education: University of Oxford (BPhil, DPhil)
- Scientific career
- Fields: Philosophy; Logic; Alan Turing
- Workplaces: University of Plymouth; University of Canterbury
- Thesis: Entailment : the formalisation of inference (1978)
- Doctoral advisor: Dana Scott
- Website: www.canterbury.ac.nz/arts/contact-us/people/jack-copeland.html

Brian Jack Copeland (born 1950) is Professor of Philosophy at the University of Canterbury, Christchurch, New Zealand, and author of books on the computing pioneer Alan Turing.

== Education ==
Copeland was educated at the University of Oxford, obtaining a Bachelor of Philosophy degree and a Doctor of Philosophy degree in 1978, where he undertook research on modal logic and non-classical logic supervised by Dana Scott.

== Career and research ==
Jack Copeland is the Director of the Turing Archive for the History of Computing, an extensive online archive on the computing pioneer Alan Turing. He has also written and edited books on Turing. He is one of the people responsible for identifying the concept of hypercomputation and machines more capable than Turing machines. With Jason Long he restored some of the first computer music recorded on the Ferranti Mark I.

Copeland has held visiting professorships at the University of Sydney, Australia (1997, 2002), the University of Aarhus, Denmark (1999), the University of Melbourne, Australia (2002, 2003), and the University of Portsmouth, United Kingdom (1997–2005). In 2000, he was a Senior Fellow in the Dibner Institute for the History of Science and Technology at the Massachusetts Institute of Technology, United States.

Copeland is also President of the US Society for Machines and Mentality and a member of the UK Bletchley Park Trust Heritage Advisory Panel. He is the founding editor of The Rutherford Journal, established in 2005.

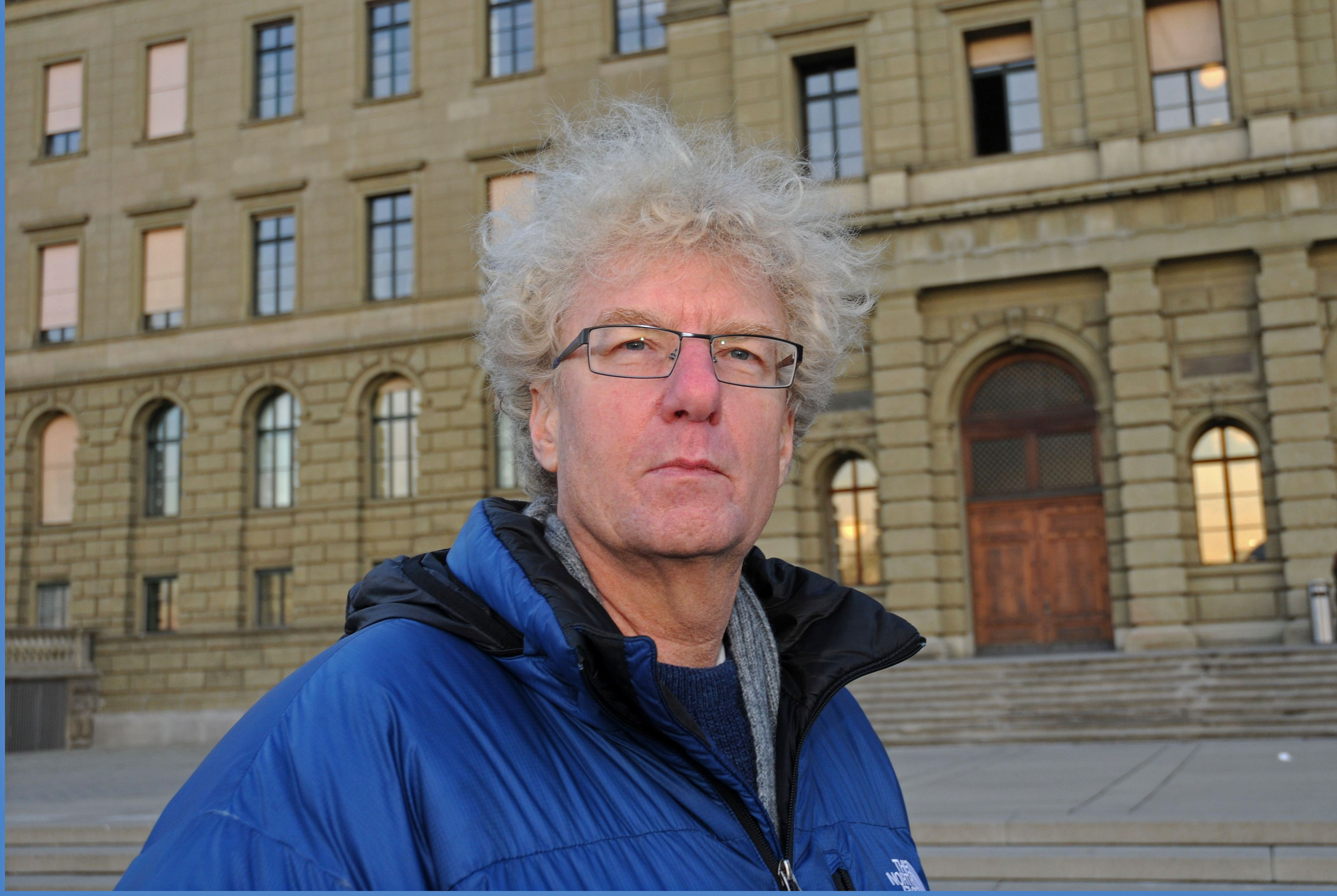
Jack Copeland at the ETH Zurich (Switzerland), October 2013

Jack Copeland and Diane Proudfoot suggested the establishment of a Turing Center in Zurich during a guest stay at ETH Zurich in 2012. The idea was implemented and ETH Zurich was able to open the Turing Center Zurich in 2015. It is operational organizes regular conferences on questions related to computers and artificial intelligence.

=== The Rutherford Journal ===
The Rutherford Journal
- Discipline: History and philosophy of science
- Language: English
- Edited by: Jack Copeland

Publication details
- History: 2005 onwards
- Publisher: University of Canterbury (New Zealand)

Standard abbreviations
- ISO 4: Rutherford J.

Indexing
- ISSN: 1177-1380
- OCLC no.: 145735058

Links
- Journal homepage

Copeland serves as editor-in-chief of The Rutherford Journal, an open-access peer-reviewed online academic journal published in New Zealand that covers the history and philosophy of science and technology. The journal is published as needed and was established in December 2005 by Copeland. The full text of articles is freely available online in HTML format. The journal is named after the New Zealand physicist Ernest Rutherford (1871–1937), who studied at the Canterbury College (Christchurch).

The journal is indexed in various index lists. It was listed in an article on electronic journals in the Journal for the Association of History and Computing and included in the Isis Current Bibliography of the History of Science and Its Cultural Influences. The journal features technology as diverse as totalisators and the CSIRAC computer.

=== Publications ===
- Artificial Intelligence: A Philosophical Introduction (Blackwell, 1993, 2nd edition due) ISBN 0-631-18385-X
- Logic and Reality Essays on the Legacy of Arthur Prior (Oxford University Press, 1996) ISBN 0-19-824060-0
- The Essential Turing (Oxford University Press, 2004) ISBN 0-19-825080-0 (pbk); ISBN 0-19-825079-7 (hbk)
- Alan Turing’s Automatic Computing Engine: The Master Codebreaker's Struggle to Build the Modern Computer (Oxford University Press, 2005) ISBN 0-19-856593-3
- Colossus: The Secrets of Bletchley Park's Codebreaking Computers (Oxford University Press, 2006) ISBN 0-19-284055-X
- Alan Turing’s Electronic Brain: The Struggle to Build the ACE, the World’s Fastest Computer (Oxford University Press, 2012) ISBN 978-0-19-960915-4
- Computability: Turing, Gödel, Church, and Beyond (MIT Press, 2013). ISBN 978-0-262-52748-4 (with Carl Posy and Oron Shagrir)
- Turing: Pioneer of the Information Age (Oxford University Press, 2014: Paperback edition) ISBN 978-0-19-871918-2
- The Turing Guide (Oxford University Press, 2017) ISBN 978-0-19-874782-6 (hardcover), ISBN 978-0-19-874783-3 (paperback) (with Jonathan Bowen, Robin Wilson, Mark Sprevak, et al.)

=== Awards and honours ===
Copeland was awarded Lecturer of the Year 2010 by the University of Canterbury's student union.
