= Alan Turing: The Enigma =

Biography by Andrew Hodges

- Cover for the movie tie-in edition
- Author: Andrew Hodges
- Language: English
- Subject: Alan Turing (1912–1954)
- Genre: Biography
- Published: 1983 (Burnett Books/Hutchinson, UK & Simon & Schuster, USA)
- Publication place: United Kingdom
- Media type: Print (hardcover, paperback, audio)
- Pages: 587
- ISBN: 0-671-49207-1
- OCLC: 11516745
- Dewey Decimal: 510.92
- LC Class: QA29.T8H63

Alan Turing: The Enigma (1983) is a biography of the British mathematician, codebreaker, and early computer scientist, Alan Turing (1912–1954) by Andrew Hodges. The book covers Alan Turing's life and work, as well as supplementary individuals in his life including Christopher Morcom and Conel Hugh O'Donel Alexander.

The 2014 film The Imitation Game is loosely based on the book, with dramatization as well as reduction of certain details and a focus on wartime events. The earlier play and film Breaking the Code was inspired by the same biography, and portrayed more of Turing's life.

== Editions ==
The following editions of the book exist:

Hardback

- UK: Burnett Books/Hutchinson (1983)
- US: Simon & Schuster (1983)

Paperback

- UK: Counterpoint (Alan Turing: The Enigma of Intelligence, without photographs)
- US: Touchstone Books
- UK: Vintage Books (1992–2012, including the 2012 centenary edition)
- US: Walker Books (2000–2005)
- US: Princeton University Press (2014)

New editions appeared in 2012, for the centenary of Turing's birth, and 2014, the year the film The Imitation Game was released.

Audio

- Audible.co.uk (30-hour recording)

== Reviews ==
The book has been widely reviewed by newspapers and magazines including The Guardian, The Independent, Los Angeles Times, Nature, New Statesman, New Yorker, The New York Times, Notices of the American Mathematical Society, Physics Today, Sunday Times, Time Out, Times Literary Supplement, The Wall Street Journal.

== Influence ==
The book inspired the 2014 film The Imitation Game, directed by Morten Tyldum and starring Benedict Cumberbatch and Keira Knightley.

== See also ==
- The Annotated Turing (2008)
- Prof: Alan Turing Decoded (2015)
- The Turing Guide (2017)
