= Harry Fensom =

World War 2 codebreaker

Harry William Fensom
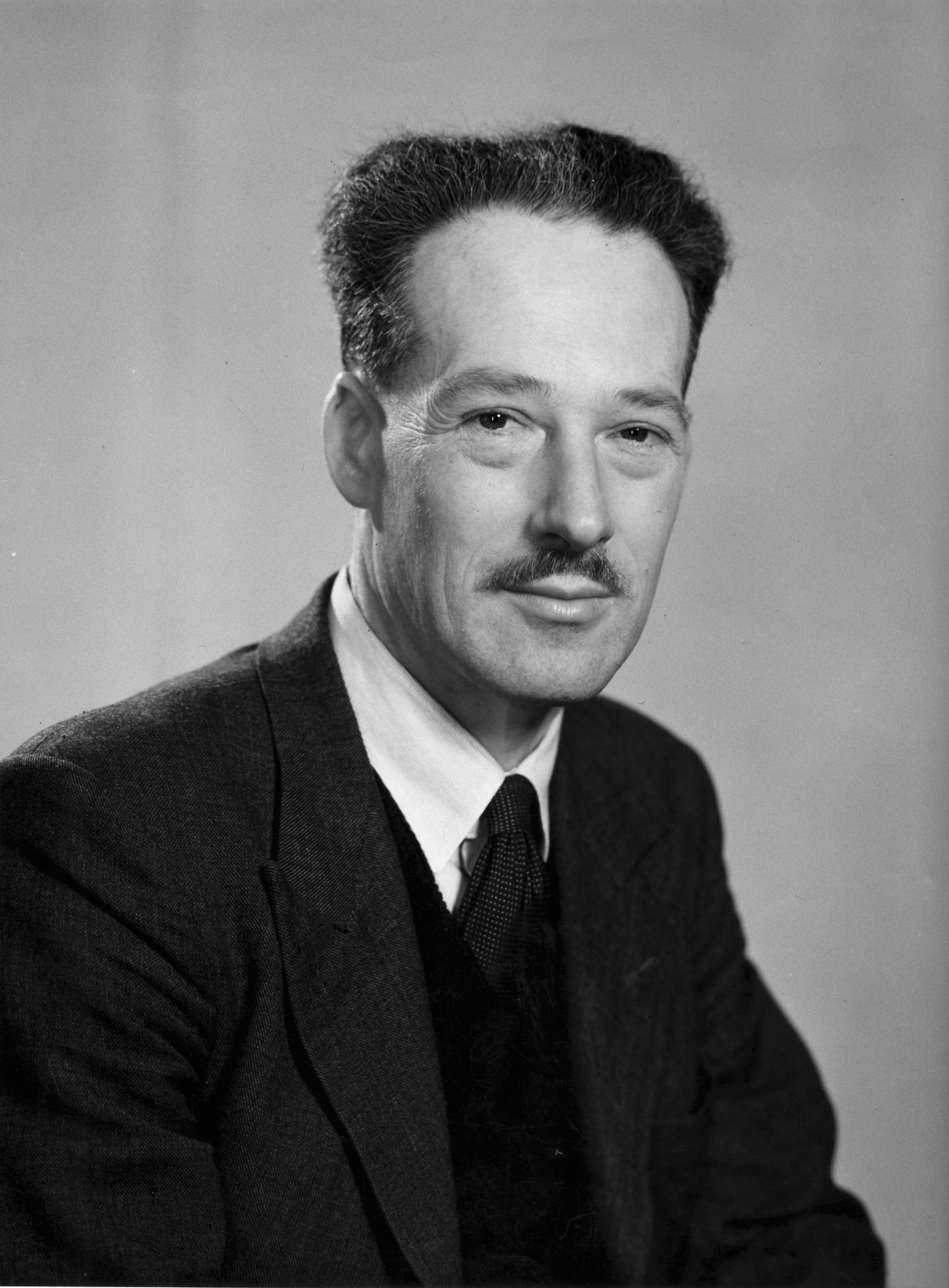
- Fensom around the time he worked at Bletchley Park
- Born: 4 February 1921; Catford, London, United Kingdom
- Died: 1 November 2010 (aged 89); Felixstowe, United Kingdom
- Occupation: Electronic Engineer
- Known for: Worked on Colossus at Bletchley Park

Harry William Fensom (4 February 1921 – 1 November 2010) was an English electronic engineer with the GPO. During World War II he worked with Tommy Flowers at Bletchley Park on Colossus, the world's first electronic computer, that helped to decode encrypted German messages using the Lorenz cipher. After the war, he designed ERNIE, a machine based on Colossus engineering that was used to generate bond numbers for the Premium Bond draw.

== Early life and education ==
Fensom was born in Catford, in South London. Shortly after his birth the family moved to Fife, where they stayed until 1928. His secondary education was at the Royal Liberty School in Gidea Park where he excelled in mathematics and the sciences. He left school at 16, shunning a university education in favour of finding work. Whilst working for the GPO as an engineer, Fensom continued his education at night school, studying for City and Guilds at East Ham, Borough and Northampton polytechnics.

== World War II ==
In 1942, Fensom was sent to work at Dollis Hill Research Station with Tommy Flowers, Sidney Broadhurst and William Chandler. He began working on projects connected to the Enigma machine. These included the Shark and the Cobra, which was the first electronic codebreaking device. Other projects included the Nightingale, used to decode messages from the Hagelin C-36 which was being used by the Italians, the Tunny and the Heath Robinson. Fensom's work took him increasingly to Bletchley Park and in December 1943 the first Colossus machine was installed at Bletchley Park to decode the messages from the Lorenz machine. The Mark II Colossus was installed on 1 June 1944 in time for the D-day landings on 6 June. By the end of the war there were ten functioning Colossi working around the clock helping to decipher the messages of German High Command. The deciphered messages provided the Allies with crucial intelligence on what enemy armed forces were plotting. The allies knew for example that Hitler had swallowed the bait that the D-Day landings in June 1944 would be at Calais rather than Normandy. This gave the Allies a decisive advantage.

Sir Harry Hinsley, as the official historian, in his book 'British Intelligence in the Second World War' gave his opinion that the breaking of the Enigma and Lorenz codes shortened the war by at least two years and saved hundreds of thousands of lives.

== Post war activity ==
After the war, Fensom continued to work for the GPO at Dollis Hill. In 1957 he was given charge by Sydney Broadhurst of the system design of a machine called ERNIE, which was to be used to deliver the winning numbers of the prizes for the Premium Bonds.

After his retirement, Fensom assisted Tony Sale in the Colossus rebuild project at the National Museum of Computing. Fensom and Sale visited Allen Coombs in Plymouth in 1996. Coombs had (illegally) kept his wartime notes which proved very useful in Sale's attempt to recreate Colossus.
