= MOSAIC (computer) =

One of the earliest computers built in the United Kingdom

- Also known as: Ministry of Supply Automatic Integrator and Computer
- Developer: Allen Coombs and William Chandler, Post Office Research Station, Dollis Hill, for the Radar Research and Development Establishment (RRDE)
- Manufacturer: Telecommunications Research Establishment, All-Power Transformer Co.
- Released: 1955; 71 years ago
- Units sold: 1
- CPU: 6,480 vacuum tubes; c.2,000 diodes @ c.570 kilocycles per second
- Memory: 1,024 40-bit words (mercury delay lines)
- Power: 60 kilowatts
- Dimensions: Four rooms
- Predecessor: Automatic Computing Engine (ACE)
- Related: Pilot ACE; EDSAC

The MOSAIC (Ministry of Supply Automatic Integrator and Computer) was an early British computer based on the Automatic Computing Engine (ACE), another early British electronic serial stored-program computer that was designed by Alan Turing at the UK's National Physical Laboratory (NPL).

The first implementation of Turing's design was a cut-down version of the full ACE design, known as the Pilot ACE. MOSAIC was a second implementation of the ACE design. This was built by Allen Coombs and William Chandler of the Post Office Research Station in Dollis Hill, who had worked with Tommy Flowers on building the ten Colossus computers for decryption use at Bletchley Park during World War II.

MOSAIC was installed at the Radar Research and Development Establishment (RRDE) at Malvern, which later merged with the Telecommunications Research Establishment (TRE) to become the Royal Radar Establishment (RRE). It ran its first trial program in late 1952 (or early 1953) and became operational in early 1955. The MOSAIC computer contained 6,480 electronic valves and around 2,000 germanium semiconductor diodes. It had an availability of about 75%. It occupied four rooms and was the largest of the early British computers. It was used to calculate aircraft trajectories from radar data. It continued operating until the early 1960s. The computer ran at around 570 kilocycles per second.

The MOSAIC project was implemented between 1947 and 1954 by a team from the Post Office Research Station led by Dr Allen Coombes. NPL helped with the mathematical specification, and the All-Power Transformer Co. aided the computer's manufacture and assembly. Some of the MOSAIC project remains secret since it was used for processing radar tracking data in experiments on aircraft. The computer had a storage capacity of 1,024 40-bit words, implemented in mercury delay lines, with about a ton of triple-distilled mercury. The physical layout of the delay-line tanks in MOSAIC was adapted from that used by the EDSAC computer, developed at the University of Cambridge. The computer used 60 kilowatts to power it. MOSAIC was not the first of the early British computers, but it was probably the largest at the time.

== See also ==
- List of vacuum-tube computers
- Automatic Computing Engine
- Pilot ACE
- Ministry of Supply
