= Arnold Lynch =

Arnold Lynch (3 June 1914 – 13 November 2004) was an English engineer, known for his work on an optical tape reader which was used in the construction of the Colossus, the first electronic computer. By 1944 ten Colossus computers were installed at Bletchley Park and used to read high-level (Fish or Tunny) German ciphers.

Lynch joined the Post Office Research Station in 1936, specialising in the measurement of the electrical and magnetic properties of materials. He retired in 1974, but continued to come to work at NPL in the dielectric area of RF and microwave electromagnetism up to the year of his death.

The Maths, Art and Design Technology Department at Dame Alice Owen's School was named after Lynch, in thanks for his work during his time at the school and his success as a scientist.

He married Edith Taylor in 1953. Their children are Cedric Lynch and two daughters.
