= Heath Robinson (codebreaking machine) =

British codebreaking device of WW2

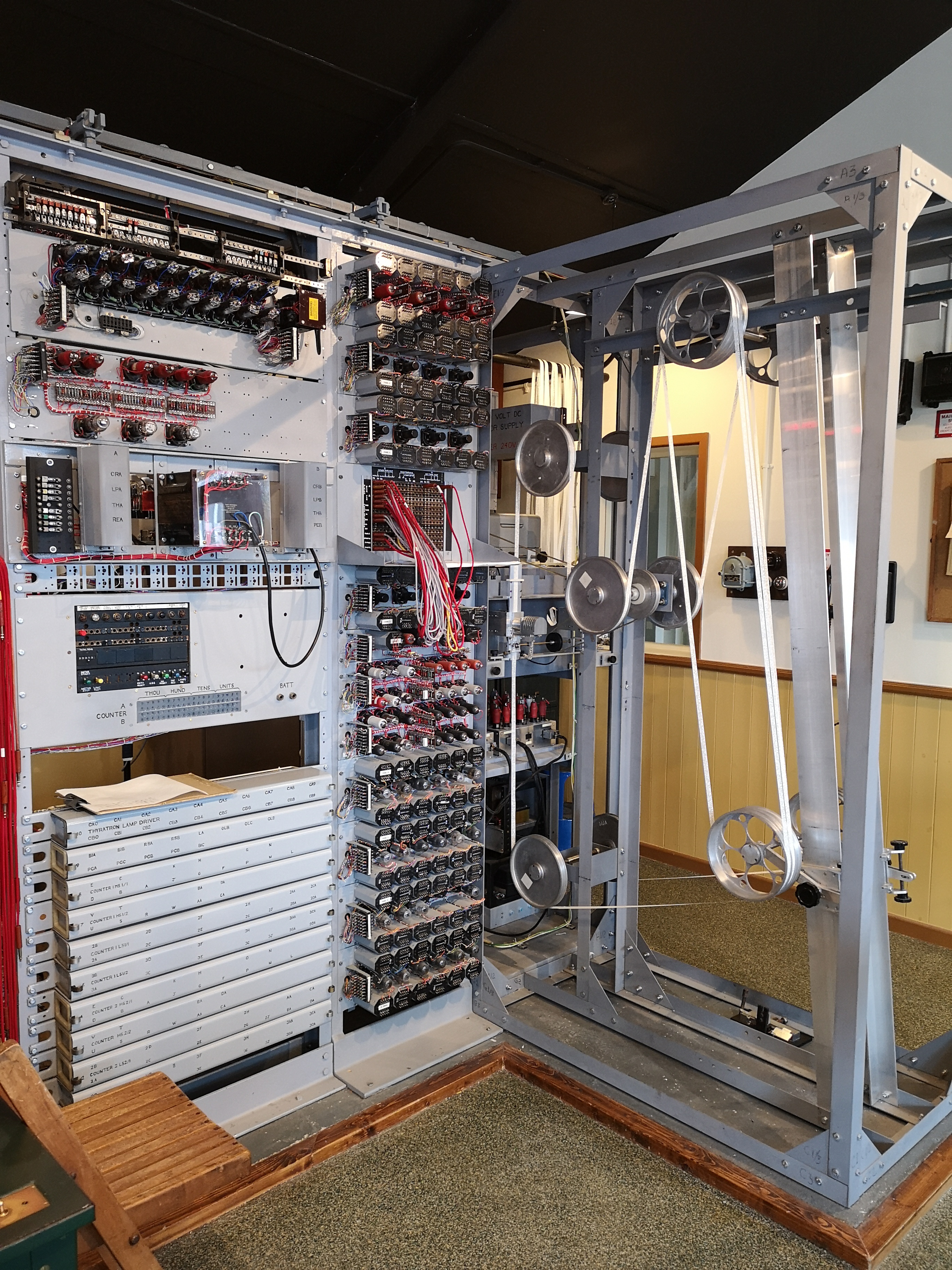
Working replica Heath Robinson machine at The National Museum of Computing on Bletchley Park. On the right is the paper tape transport mechanism that was dubbed the "bedstead" because of a resemblance to an upended metal bed-frame.

Heath Robinson was a machine used by British codebreakers at the Government Code and Cypher School at Bletchley Park during World War II in cryptanalysis of the Lorenz cipher. This achieved the decryption of messages in the German teleprinter cipher produced by the Lorenz SZ40/42 in-line cipher machine. Both the cipher and the machines were called "Tunny" by the codebreakers, who named different German teleprinter ciphers after fish. It was mainly an electro-mechanical machine, containing no more than a couple of dozen valves (vacuum tubes), and was the predecessor to the electronic Colossus computer. It was dubbed "Heath Robinson" by the Wrens who operated it, after cartoonist William Heath Robinson, who drew immensely complicated mechanical devices for simple tasks, similar to (and somewhat predating) Rube Goldberg in the U.S.

The functional specification of the machine was produced by Max Newman. The main engineering design was the work of Frank Morrell at the Post Office Research Station at Dollis Hill in North London, with his colleague Tommy Flowers designing the "Combining Unit". Dr C. E. Wynn-Williams from the Telecommunications Research Establishment at Malvern produced the high-speed electronic valve and relay counters. Construction started in January 1943, the prototype machine was delivered to Bletchley Park in June and was first used to help read current encrypted traffic soon afterwards.

As the Robinson was a bit slow and unreliable, it was later replaced by the Colossus computer for many purposes, including the methods used against the twelve-rotor Lorenz SZ42 on-line teleprinter cipher machine (code named Tunny, for tunafish).

== Tutte's statistical method ==
The basis of the method that the Heath Robinson machine implemented was Bill Tutte's "1+2 technique". This involved examining the first two of the five impulses of the characters of the message on the ciphertext tape and combining them with the first two impulses of part of the key as generated by the $\chi$ wheels of the Lorenz machine. This involved reading two long loops of paper tape, one containing the ciphertext and the other the $\chi$ component of the key. By making the key tape one character longer than the message tape, each of the 1271 starting position of the $\chi$_{1} $\chi$_{2} sequence was tried against the message. A count was amassed for each start position and, if it exceeded a pre-defined "set total", was printed out. The highest count was the most likely one to be the one with the correct values of $\chi$_{1} and $\chi$_{2}. With these values, settings of the other $\chi$ wheels could be tried to break all five $\chi$ wheel starting positions for this message. This then allowed the effect of the $\chi$ component of the key to be removed and the resulting modified message attacked by manual methods in the Testery.

== Tape transport ==
The "bedstead" was a system of pulleys around which two continuous loops of tape were driven in synchrony. Initially this was by means of a pair of sprocket wheels on a common axle. This was changed to drive by friction pulleys with the sprocket wheels maintaining the synchrony when it was found that this caused less damage to the tapes. Speeds of up to 2000 characters per second were achieved for shorter tapes, but only 1000 for longer tapes. The tapes were guided past an array of photo-electric cells where the characters and other signals were read. Possible tape lengths on the bedstead were from 2000 to 11,000 characters.

== Tape reading ==
The perforated tapes were read photo-electrically at a "gate" which was placed as near as possible to the sprocket to reduce the effect of stretched tapes. Successive characters on the tape were read by a battery of ten photocells, an eleventh for the sprocket holes and two additional ones for the "stop" and "start" signals that were hand-punched between the third and fourth and fourth and fifth channels.

== Combining unit ==
This was designed by Tommy Flowers of the Post Office Research Station at Dollis Hill in North London. It used thermionic valves (vacuum tubes) to implement the logic. This involved the Boolean "exclusive or" (XOR) function in combining the various bit-streams. In the following "truth table", 1 represents "true" and 0 represents "false". (At Bletchley Park these were known as x and • respectively.)

INPUT		OUTPUT
A	B	A ⊕ B
0	0	0
0	1	1
1	0	1
1	1	0

Other names for this function are: "not equal" (NEQ), "modulo 2 addition" (without carry) and "modulo 2 subtraction" (without 'borrow'). Note that modulo 2 addition and subtraction are identical. Some descriptions of Tunny decryption refer to addition and some to differencing, i.e. subtraction, but they mean the same thing.

The combining unit implemented the logic of Tutte's statistical method. This required that the paper tape containing the ciphertext was tried against a tape that contained the component of the Lorenz cipher machine generated by the relevant two chi wheels at all possible starting positions. A count was then made of the total number of 0s generated, with a high count indicating a greater probability of the starting position of the chi key sequence being correct.

== Counting ==
Wynn-Williams had obtained his PhD at Cambridge University for his work at the Cavendish Laboratory with Sir Ernest Rutherford. In 1926 he had constructed an amplifier using thermionic valves (vacuum tubes) for the very small electrical currents arising from detectors in their nuclear disintegration experiments. Rutherford had got him to devote his attention to the construction of a reliable valve amplifier and methods of registering and counting these particles. The counter used gas-filled Thyratron tubes which are bi-stable devices.

The counters that Wynn-Williams designed for Heath Robinson, and subsequently for the Colossus computers used thyratrons to count units of 1, 2, 4, 8; high speed relays to count units of 16, 32, 48, 64; and slower relays to count 80, 160, 240, 320, 400, 800, 1200, 1600, 2000, 4000, 6000, and 8000. The count obtained for each run-through of the message tape was compared with a pre-set value, and if it exceeded it, was displayed along with a count that indicated the position of the key tape in relation to the message tape. The Wren operators initially had to write down these numbers before the next count that exceeded the threshold was displayed – which was "a fruitful source of error", so a printer was soon introduced.

== Robinson developments ==
The original Heath Robinson was a prototype and was effective despite a number of serious shortcomings. All but one of these, the lack of "spanning" ability, were progressively overcome in the development of what became known as "Old Robinson". However, Tommy Flowers realised that he could produce a machine that generated the key stream electronically so that the main problem of keeping two tapes synchronised with each other would be eliminated. This was the genesis of the Colossus computer.

Despite the success of Colossus, the Robinson approach was still valuable for certain problems. Improved versions were developed, nicknamed Peter Robinson and Robinson and Cleaver after department stores in London. A further development of the ideas was a machine called Super Robinson or Super Rob. Designed by Tommy Flowers, this one had four bedsteads to allow for running four tapes and was used for running depths and "cribs" or known-plaintext attack runs.

== Bibliography ==
- Budiansky, Stephen (2006), Colossus, Codebreaking, and the Digital Age in Copeland 2006, pp. 52–63
- Carter, Frank, Colossus and the Breaking of the Lorenz Cipher (PDF), Technical Papers, Bletchley Park National Codes Centre, archived from the original (PDF) on 8 May 2012
- Copeland, Jack (2000), A Brief History of Computing
- Copeland, B. Jack, ed. (2006), Colossus: The Secrets of Bletchley Park's Codebreaking Computers, Oxford: Oxford University Press, ISBN 978-0-19-284055-4
- Flowers, Thomas H. (July 1983), "The Design of Colossus", Annals of the History of Computing, 5 (3): 239–252, doi:10.1109/MAHC.1983.10079, S2CID 39816473, archived from the original on 26 March 2006
- Gannon, Paul (2006). Colossus: Bletchley Park's Greatest Secret. London: Atlantic Books. ISBN 1-84354-330-3.
- Good, Jack; Michie, Donald; Timms, Geoffrey (1945), General Report on Tunny: With Emphasis on Statistical Methods, UK Public Record Office HW 25/4 and HW 25/5, archived from the original on 17 September 2010 That version is a facsimile copy, but there is a transcript of much of this document in '.pdf' format at: Sale, Tony (2001), Part of the "General Report on Tunny", the Newmanry History, formatted by Tony Sale (PDF), and a web transcript of Part 1 at: Ellsbury, Graham, General Report on Tunny With Emphasis on Statistical Methods
- Newman, Max, Appendix 7: ∆$\chi$-Method in Copeland 2006, pp. 387–390
- Randell, Brian, Of Men and Machines in Copeland 2006, pp. 141–149
- Sale, Tony, The Colossus: its purpose and operation: The machine age comes to Fish code breaking
- Sale, Tony, The rebuilding of Heath Robinson (PDF)
- Small, Albert W. (December 1944), The Special Fish Report (PDF), p. 108
- Tutte, William T. (2006), Appendix 4: My Work at Bletchley Park in Copeland 2006, pp. 352–369
- Tutte, W. T. (19 June 1998), Fish and I (PDF) Transcript of a lecture given by Prof. Tutte at the University of Waterloo
