= Confravision =

Early British videoconferencing service

A Confravision studio circa 1975

Confravision was an early British studio-based city-to-city videoconferencing service in the United Kingdom, launched in 1971 by Post Office Telecommunications. In 1972, Confravision was available between studios in Bristol, Birmingham, Glasgow, London, and Manchester.

The studio locations were:

- Euston Tower
- 2-12 Gresham Street, London
- Telephone House, Birmingham
- Clifton Heights, Bristol
- India House, Glasgow
- Bridgewater House, Manchester

The interior design of the studios was by the industrial designer Kenneth Grange. Each studio had seating and microphones for five participants. Up to three sites could be connected at one time. Calls could be booked either by telephone or telex.

The Confravision system was still in use in 1982. A Confravision department was still listed in BT's internal directory in 1986.

== Development ==
The Confravision service developed from early experiments using microwave radio links between Post Office Telecommunication's headquarters in Gresham Street and the Post Office Research Station in Dollis Hill.

Sound-in-sync digital audio transmission was used on some links where there could not be separate audio and video paths.

Experimental services were launched in 1975 connecting Confravision to Sweden and the Netherlands.

Following the early developments in Confravision, digital video compression techniques would substantially reduce the bandwidth needed for videoconferencing. Experimental tests were made of transatlantic videoconferencing between the British Confravision system and AT&T's Picturephone service over a 1.544 Mbit/s T-carrier digital circuit running over the TAT-6 transatlantic analog submarine cable.
