= George (robot) =

1949 robot

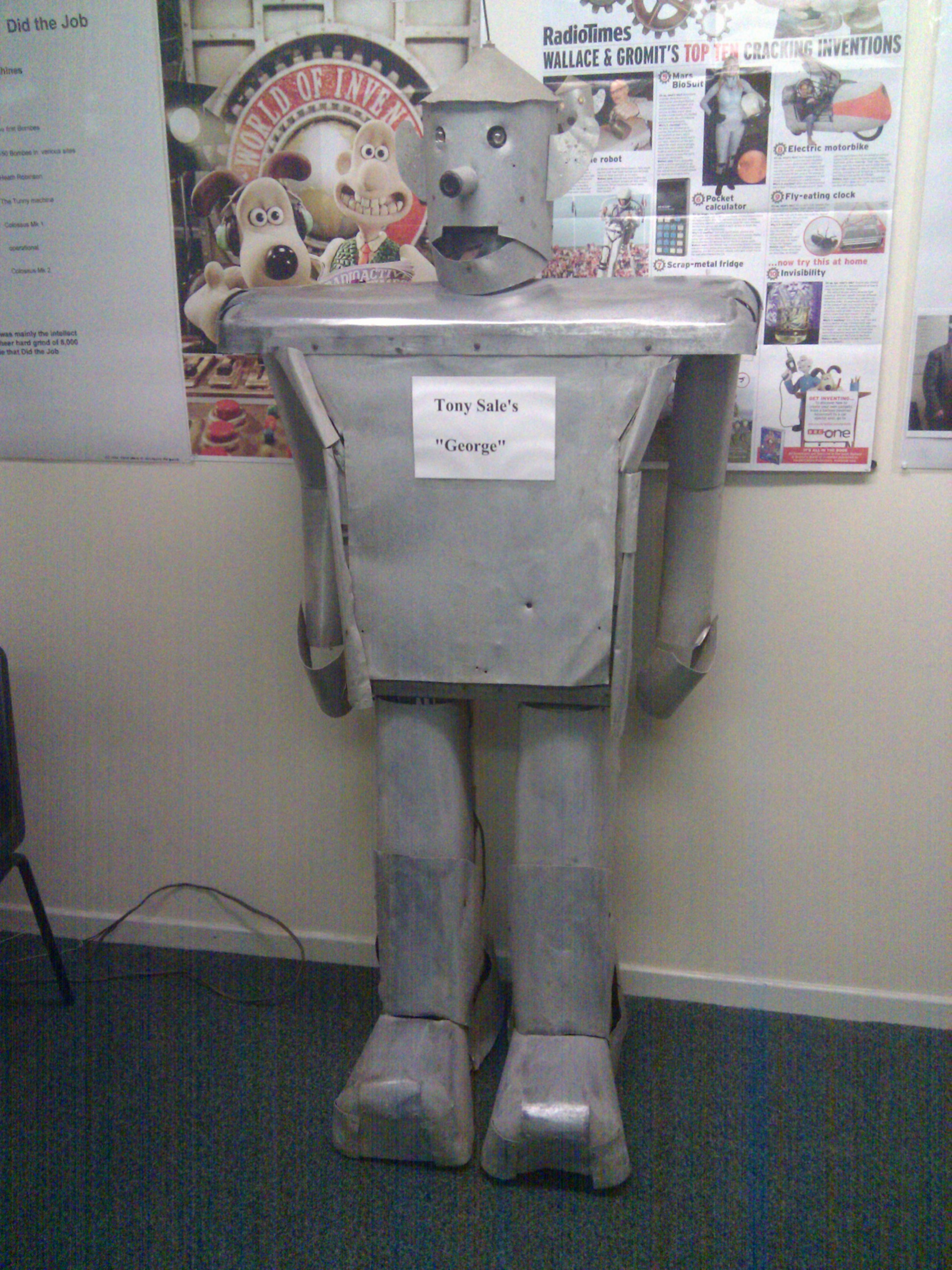
George at Bletchley Park in 2010

George is a British humanoid robot created by Tony Sale in 1949. The robot was built using scrap metals from a crashed RAF Wellington bomber. George was reactivated in 2010 by Sale and is on display at The National Museum of Computing at Bletchley Park.

== History ==
In 1949 Tony Sale used the scrap metal from a grounded Wellington bomber to build a simple 6-foot (1.8 m) humanoid robot he named George. The construction cost for the robot was about £15. Actually, this robot could be considered George Mark IV, as Sale had already built a very basic robot in his parents' garage when he was 12 and named it George, plus two later versions.

The last George robot, the only one extant, was built when Sale joined the Royal Air Force in 1949 as a radar instructor at the RAF Debden base in Essex. It could walk, turn the head, move its arms and sit down. It was powered by a pair of motorcycle batteries put inside his chest. The robot could also move his jaw to speak and be controlled by radio remote. The external cover of the body was made in aluminium and duralumin. George was put on display at the open days at the RAF Debden base and also appeared on television.

== 2010 reactivation ==
In November 2010 Tony Sale reactivated George after 45 years of total inactivity. The robot had been stored in Sale's garage. The original batteries were replaced with new lithium batteries and some minor fixing occurred. Sale described the process with the words: "I dug him out of the garage where he had been standing for 45 years, I had a fair bit of confidence he would work again and luckily I was right. I put some oil on the bearings and added a couple of new lithium batteries in his legs, switched him on and away he went. It was a lovely moment."

The event gathered worldwide news-media attention, and George's reactivation was shown in the third episode of Wallace and Gromit's World of Invention. After the reactivation, Tony Sale donated George to the National Museum of Computing, where it remains on display to the public.

== 2020 exhibition ==
On 15 March 2020, the robot was put up for display as part of the Robots Exhibition on Tekniska museet in Stockholm, Sweden.
