= Allen Coombs =

British electronics engineer and early computer designer

- Born: Allen William Mark Coombs; 23 October 1911; Bristol, Gloucester, England
- Died: 30 January 1995 (aged 83); Yealmpton, Devon, England
- Other names: "Doc"
- Education: University of Glasgow; University of Strathclyde
- Occupation: Electronics engineer
- Employer: Post Office Research Station (1936–1973)
- Known for: Colossus computer MOSAIC computer

Allen William Mark ("Doc") Coombs (23 October 1911 – 30 January 1995) was a British electronics engineer and early computer designer at the Post Office Research Station, Dollis Hill, known for his work on the Colossus and MOSAIC (computer) computers.

Allen Combes was born in Bristol, England. He was educated at the University of Glasgow, receiving a BSc degree in 1932 and achieving a PhD degree in 1936. He also received an ARTC award (later designated ARCST – Associate of the Royal College of Science and Technology) through the University of Strathclyde in 1932.

Coombs was one of the principal designers of the Mark II or production version of the Colossus computer, used at Bletchley Park for codebreaking in World War II, and took over leadership of the project when Tommy Flowers moved on to other projects. Professor Brian Randell was researching the history of computer science in Britain for a conference on the history of computing held at the Los Alamos National Laboratory, New Mexico on 10–15 June 1976, and ontained permission to present a paper on wartime development of the COLOSSI at the Post Office Research Station, Dollis Hill (in October 1975 the British Government released a series of captioned photographs from the Public Record Office). The interest in the "revelations" in his paper resulted in a special evening meeting when Randell and Cooombs answered further questions. Coombs later wrote that no member of our team could ever forget the fellowship, the sense of purpose and, above all, the breathless excitement of those days. In 1977, Randell published an article The First Electronic Computer in several journals.

Later at Dollis Hill, Coombs worked on the MOSAIC computing machine. Coombs headed the scientific side of R14, the division working on optical character recognition for postal mechanisation, which moved to the new BT Research Centre at Martlesham in Suffolk. His work on pattern recognition led to the development of an early postcode-reading machine.

Coombs frequently lectured on pattern recognition using the concept of multi-dimensional space, and the 'caltrop', and would demonstrate the presence of feature-detection in the human visual system by means of a flash gun, the persistence of vision in the audience leading them to observe the disintegration of a character fragment by fragment. "Doc" Coombs was notable for a facial 'tic', which gave him something of the appearance of the 'mad professor', and these days would probably be classed under Tourette's syndrome.

In 1995, Combes died at Yealmpton, Devon, England.

== See also ==
- List of pioneers in computer science
