= Tony Sale =

British electronic engineer

Tony Sale with the rebuilt Colossus computer

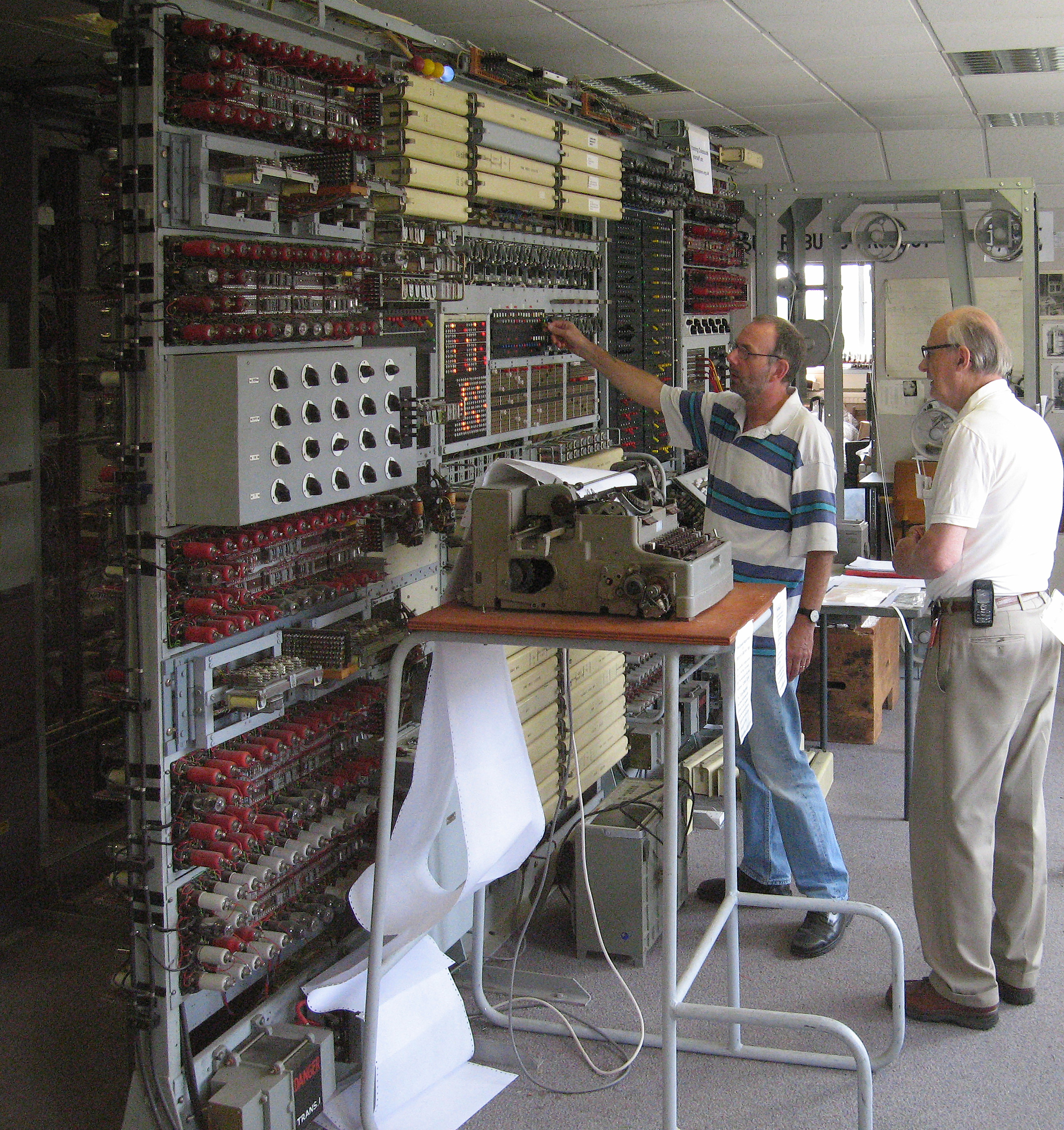
A team led by Tony Sale began a reconstruction of a Colossus computer at The National Museum of Computing.

Anthony Edgar Sale (30 January 1931 – 28 August 2011) was a British electronic engineer, computer programmer, computer hardware engineer, and historian of computing. He led the construction of a fully functional Mark 2 Colossus computer between 1993 and 2008. The rebuild is exhibited at The National Museum of Computing at Bletchley Park in England.

== Life ==
He was educated at Dulwich College in south London, During his adolescence he built George the robot out of Meccano, and continued working on it until it reached a fourth version in 1949, when it was given much media coverage. Sale joined the Royal Air Force in 1949, serving until 1952. During his three years in the RAF, Sale gained a commission and reached the rank of Flying Officer. He was an instructor at RAF Officers Radar School at RAF Debden. Sale worked as an engineer for MI5 under Peter Wright in the 1950s.

Between 1992 and 2007, Sale and volunteers rebuilt a functioning replica of the Colossus (computer) Mark II which is on display at The National Museum of Computing at Bletchley Park.

Sale and his wife Margaret had three children and seven grandchildren. Margaret continued as a volunteer guide at the museum for many years after Tony's death.

== Work ==
Sale worked with Marconi Research Laboratories, was technical director of the British Computer Society and managed the Computer Restoration Project at the Science Museum.

After becoming interested in computers, he joined the British Computer Society (BCS) in 1965 as Associate Member, being elected to Member in 1967, Fellow in 1988 and Honorary Fellow in 1996. He was elected to the Council of the BCS for the period 1967–70. In 1965, was a founder member of the Bedfordshire branch of the BCS and was named chairman in 1979.

In 1989, Sale was appointed a senior curator at the Science Museum in London and worked with Doron Swade to restore some of the museum's computer holdings. He was part of the group that started the Computer Conservation Society in 1989 and was associated with the Bletchley Park Trust from 1992 onwards. In 1991, he joined the campaign to save Bletchley Park from housing development.

In 1992, he was secretary to the newly formed Bletchley Park Trust, later unpaid museums director in 1994. In 1993 he started the Colossus Rebuild Project, inaugurated in 1994, to build a functioning replica of the Colossus computer developed and built by Tommy Flowers at the Post Office Research Station at Dollis Hill in 1943.

Sale lectured on wartime code breaking in the UK, Europe and the US. He was technical adviser for the 2001 film Enigma.

Sale's web site, Codes and Ciphers in the Second World War is a source of information on aspects of World War II code breaking. His booklet Colossus 1943–1996 outlines the breaking of the German Lorenz cipher and his remarkable rebuilding of the Colossus computer.

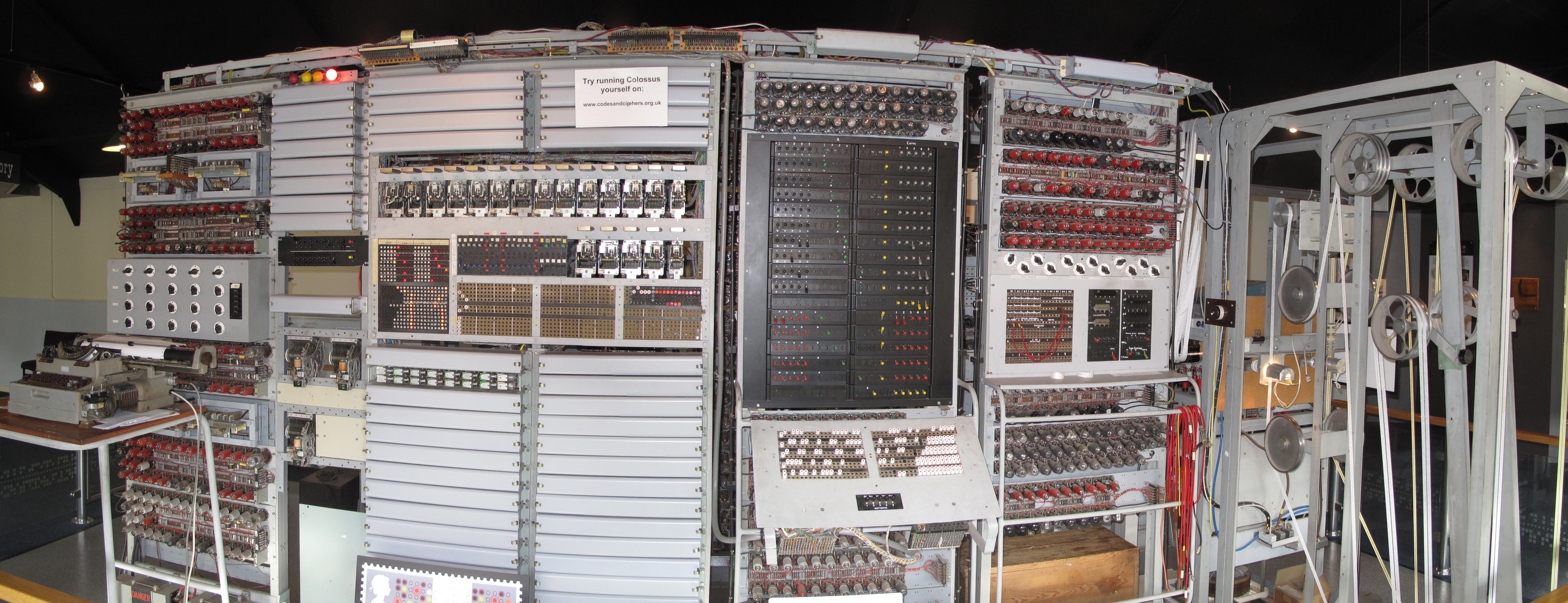
Front view of the Colossus rebuild showing, from right to left (1) The "bedstead" containing the message tape in its continuous loop and with a second one loaded. (2) The J-rack containing the Selection Panel and Plug Panel. (3) The K-rack with the large "Q" switch panel and sloping patch panel. (4) The double S-rack containing the control panel and, above the image of a postage stamp, five two-line counter displays. (5) The electric typewriter in front of the five sets of four "set total" decade switches in the C-rack.

== Honours ==
As a result of his Colossus rebuild work, Sale was awarded the Comdex IT Personality of the Year for 1997. He also received the 2000 Royal Scottish Society of Arts Silver Medal.

After his death, the British Computer Conservation Society established in 2012 the Tony Sale Award for Computer Conservation and Restoration. It comprises a trophy and a travel bursary.

In September 2019, Sale was posthumously awarded an Honorary Fellowship of the National Museum of Computing.
