= Post Office Research Station =

British research institution

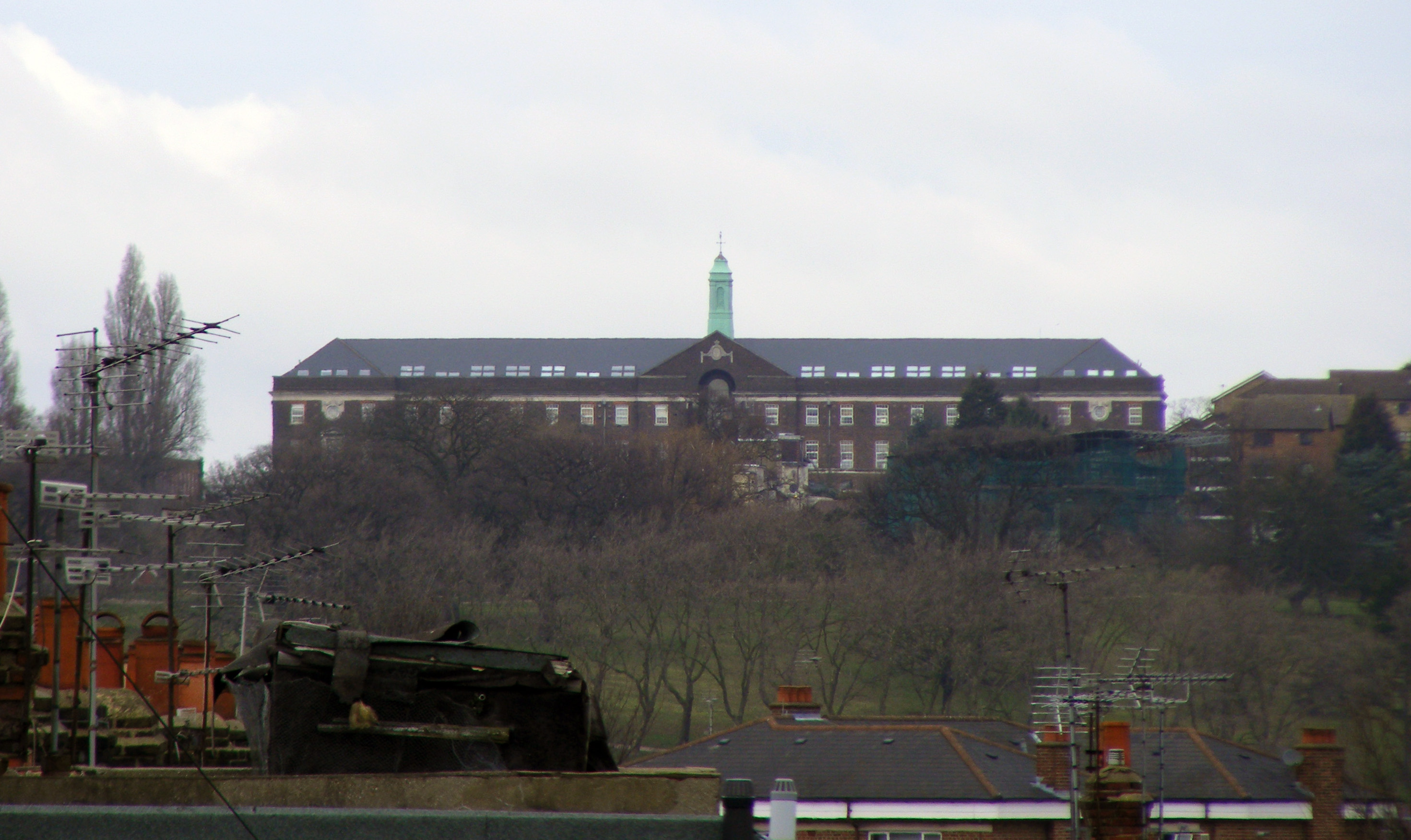
- The former Post Office Research Station at Dollis Hill, London
- Nickname: Dollis Hill
- Named after: General Post Office
- Successor: BT Research
- Formation: 1909
- Founder: General Post Office
- Dissolved: 1975
- Purpose: Research
- Headquarters: Dollis Hill
- Locations: London, United Kingdom; Martlesham Heath, United Kingdom
- Coordinates: 51°33′42″N 0°14′18″W
- Region served: United Kingdom
- Services: Engineering
- Director: Gordon Radley
- Parent organization: General Post Office

The Post Office Research Station was the research and division of the General Post Office. Prior to its absorption into BT Research, it was based in Martlesham Heath in Suffolk.

Founded in 1909, throughout much of its existence the Research Station was based in Dollis Hill, north west London. During the Second World War, the organisation made several significant breakthroughs, such as the development of Colossus (the world's first programmable electronic computer) and the first transatlantic radio telephone service, through which the Research Station substantially contributed to the Allied war effort. Accordingly, much of its more sensitive activities remained secret until decades after the conflict.

In 1975, the Research Station officially moved to Martlesham and Dollis Hill was vacated for housing development. During the 1980s, the Research Station became part of the BT Group. BT Research has continued to maintain a presence at Martlesham Heath.

== Early years ==
The Post Office Research Station was first established as a separate section of the General Post Office in 1909.

In 1921, the Research Station moved to Dollis Hill, in north west London, initially operating out of huts formerly used by the British Army. A series of permanent buildings were built throughout the 1920s and 1930s at Dollis Hill, the principal of which was officially opened in October 1933 by Prime Minister Ramsay MacDonald. The organisation operated from Dollis Hill throughout the Second World War and the majority of the Cold War.

== Second World War ==
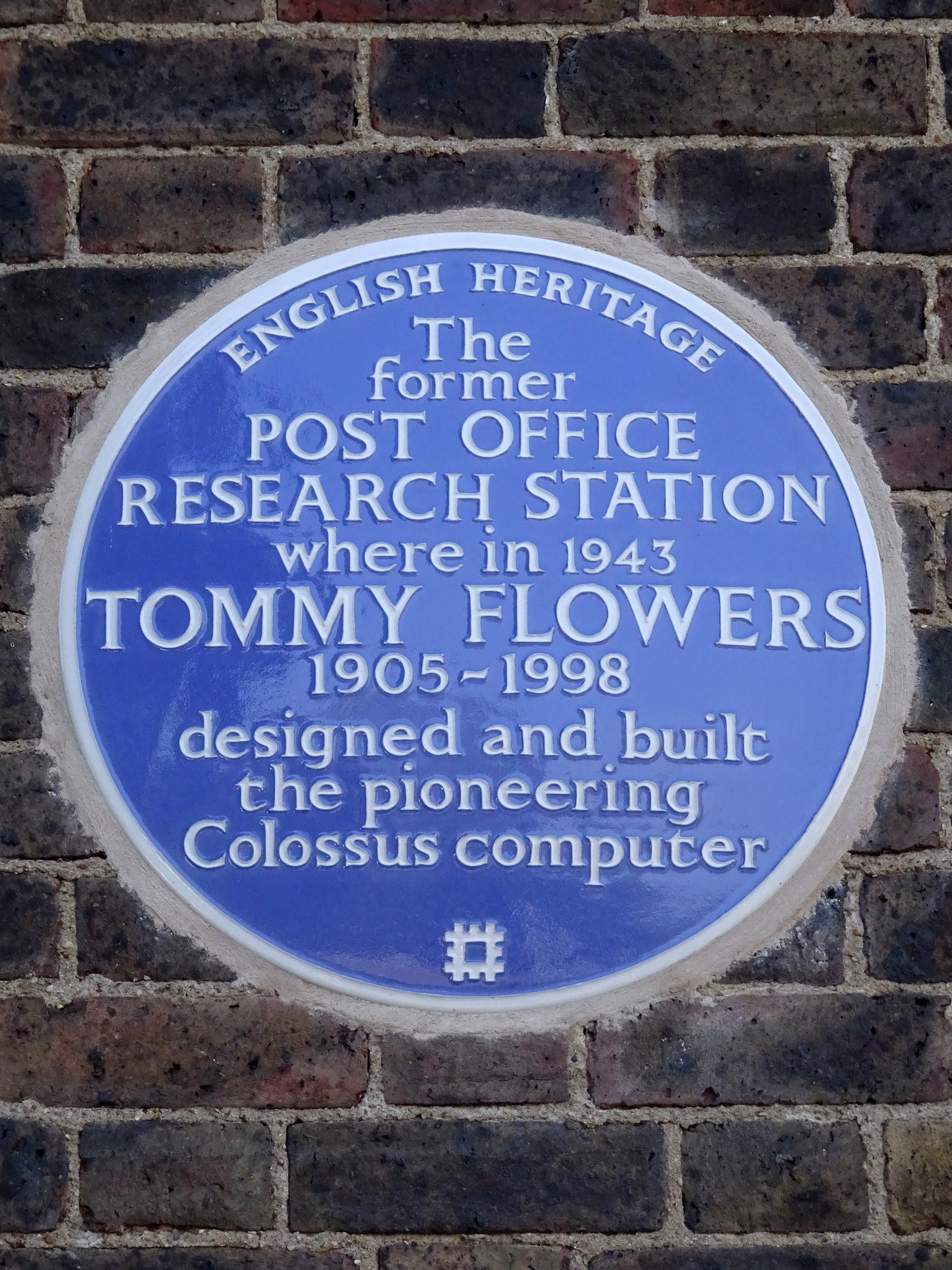
Blue plaque for Tommy Flowers at the former Post Office Research Station

In 1943, the world's first programmable electronic computer, Colossus Mark 1, was built by Tommy Flowers and his team, followed in 1944 and 1945 by nine Colossus Mark 2s. These were used at Bletchley Park in Cryptanalysis of the Lorenz cipher. Dollis Hill also built the predecessor of Colossus, the Heath Robinson codebreaking machine. The Director, Gordon Radley, was also told of the secret Bletchley Park establishment. Radley's wartime diaries were declassified in 2019.

Members of Flowers' team included Sydney Broadhurst, William W. Chandler, Harry Fensom; and Allen Coombs (who took over for the Mark II version of Colossus and also designed the later MOSAIC computer with Chandler, based on Alan Turing's design for the Automatic Computing Engine).

Paddock, a World War II concrete two-level underground bunker, was built in secret in 1939 as an alternative Cabinet War Room underneath a corner of the Dollis Hill site. Its surface building was demolished at some point, later in the post-war period.

== Research ==
The first transatlantic radio telephone service was provided in the 1940s.

In 1957, ERNIE (Electronic Random Number Indicator Equipment) was built for the government's Premium Bond lottery, by Sidney Broadhurst's team.

The early studio-based Confravision service developed from experiments using microwave radio links between the Post Office Research Station and Post Office Telecommunication's headquarters in Gresham Street, London.

In 1971, Samuel Fedida conceived Viewdata and the Prestel service was launched in 1979.

== Later developments ==
In the late 1960s, the Post Office acquired part of the decommissioned RAF Martlesham Heath airfield in Suffolk. In 1968, it was announced that the Research Station would be relocated to a new centre to be built at Martlesham Heath. This was formally opened on 21 November 1975 by Queen Elizabeth and is today known as Adastral Park. Having vacated Dollis Hill, the site was released for housing, with the main building converted into a block of luxury flats and an access road named Flowers Close, in honour of Tommy Flowers.

== Notable staff ==
- John Bray - worked on radio direction finding and meaconing. Subsequently sat on Consultative Committee on International Radio setting radio standards and developed the TV detector van.
- William W. Chandler
- Allen Coombs - principal designer of the production version (Mark II) of the Colossus computer, and took over leadership of the project when Tommy Flowers moved on to other activities.
- Dick Dyott
- James H. Ellis - joined GCHQ and undertook pioneering work on secure digital encryption.
- Samuel Fedida - responsible for the development of the information retrieval service Viewdata.
- Harry Fensom - worked on the construction and operation of Colossus, and subsiquently ERNIE, a machine based on Colossus that was used to generate bond numbers for the Premium Bond draw.
- Tommy Flowers - initial proposer and designer of Colossus, subsequently appointed head of the advanced development at Standard Telephones and Cables Ltd.
- Gil Hayward - worked on Tunny cipher and Colossus, later invented the first electronic seal security device.
- Ralph Archibald Jones - Developed espionage and counter equipment, helped invent the listening devices used for locating buried bomb victims in London, and helped devise common standards for telephone systems across Europe.
- Arnold Lynch - specialised in the measurement of the electrical and magnetic properties of materials, worked on the optical tape reader used in the construction of the Colossus, the first electronic computer.
- Frank Morrell
- Gordon Radley
- Stephanie Shirley - programmer and builder of computers, later founded the software company Freelance Programmers.
- Haakon Sørbye
- Eric Speight
- Henry John Josephs (H. J. Josephs). Entered the Research Station as a draughtsman but eventually rose to a senior research position being known for his mathematical skills. He was a great admirer of Oliver Heaviside and his work, of which Josephs wrote a monograph on the Heaviside Operational calculus. Josephs was also involved with the IEE (now Institution of Engineering and Technology) in which he presented a number of papers at the Heaviside Centenary Meeting in 1950 and went on to examine, repair and study papers of Oliver Heaviside found under the floorboards of a house in Paignton, Devon, where Oliver Heaviside had once lived.
- Captain Bertram S. Cohen (1876 or 1877 – 4 January 1943), O.B.E., Director of Post Office Research Station (? – December 1939). Author of "A Handbook of Telecommunication (Telephony and Telegraphy over wires)", published in 1946 after his death.
