= Tommy Flowers =

English engineer (1905–1998)

Tommy Flowers MBE
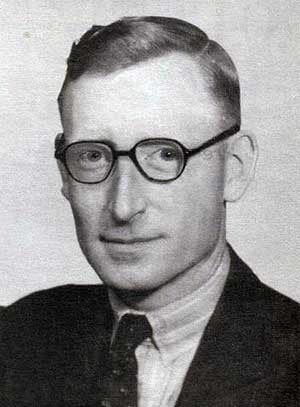
- Flowers, possibly taken around the time he was at Bletchley Park
- Born: Thomas Harold Flowers; 22 December 1905; Poplar, London, England
- Died: 28 October 1998 (aged 92); Mill Hill, London, England
- Education: University of London
- Occupation: Engineer
- Known for: Colossus computer
- Spouse: Eileen Margaret Green (m. 1935)
- Children: 2

Thomas Harold Flowers (22 December 1905 – 28 October 1998) was an English engineer with the British General Post Office. During World War II, Flowers designed and built Colossus, the world's first programmable electronic computer, to help decipher encrypted German messages.

== Early life ==
Flowers was born at 160 Abbott Road, Bromley-by-Bow, then the Metropolitan Borough of Poplar, on 22 December 1905, the son of a bricklayer. He came from an impoverished working-class background and his grandmother had been a charwoman. He later recalled that as children "we were taught to be frugal in everything".

Whilst undertaking an apprenticeship in mechanical engineering at the Royal Arsenal, Woolwich, he took evening classes at the University of London to earn a degree in electrical engineering. In 1926, he joined the telecommunications branch of the General Post Office (GPO), moving to the Post Office Research Station at Dollis Hill in Middlesex in 1930.

In 1935, Flowers married Eileen Margaret Green. The couple later had two children, John and Kenneth.

From 1934 onward, he explored the use of electronics in telephone exchanges. By 1939, his design of equipment using 3000 to 4000 valves was in limited operation for (say) 1000 lines at an exchange with each line having three or four valves. This was for (amplified) long distance or trunk circuits between exchanges (central offices), using in-band signalling with switching at each end carried out by electromechanical switches or operators. As Flowers remarked, at the outbreak of war, he was possibly the only person in Britain who realised that valves could be used reliably on a large scale for high-speed computing. He was convinced that an all-electronic system was possible. A background in switching electronics would prove crucial for his computer designs.

== World War II ==
Flowers' first contact with wartime codebreaking came in February 1941 when his director, W. Gordon Radley, was asked for help by Alan Turing, who was working at Bletchley Park, the government codebreaking establishment, 50 mi (80 km) north west of London in Buckinghamshire. Turing wanted Flowers to build a counter for the relay-based Bombe machine, which Turing had developed to help decrypt German Enigma codes.

The "Counter" project was abandoned but Turing was impressed with Flowers's work, and in February 1943 introduced him to Max Newman who was leading the effort to automate part of the cryptanalysis of the Lorenz cipher. This was a high-level German code generated by a teletypewriter in-line cipher machine, the Lorenz SZ40/42, one of their Geheimschreiber (secret writer) systems, called "Tunny" (tuna fish) by the British. It was a much more complex system than Enigma; the decoding procedure involved trying so many possibilities that it was impractical to do by hand. Flowers and Frank Morrell (also at Dollis Hill) designed the Heath Robinson, in an attempt to automate the cryptanalysis of the Lorenz SZ-40/42 cipher machine.

=== Colossus computer ===
Flowers proposed a more sophisticated alternative, using an electronic system, which his staff called Colossus, using perhaps 1,800 thermionic valves (vacuum tubes) instead of 150 and having only one paper tape instead of two (which required synchronisation) by generating the wheel patterns electronically. Because the most complicated previous electronic device had used about 150 valves, some were sceptical that the system would be reliable. Flowers countered that the British telephone system used thousands of valves and was reliable because the electronics were operated in a stable environment with the circuitry on all the time. The Bletchley management were not convinced and merely encouraged Flowers to proceed on his own. He did so at the Post Office Research Labs, using some of his own funds to build it. Flowers had first met (and got on with) Turing in 1939 but was treated with disdain by Gordon Welchman, because of his advocacy of valves rather than relays. Welchman preferred the views of Wynn-Williams and Keene of the British Tabulating Machine Company (BTM) who had designed and constructed the Bombe and wanted Radley and "Mr Flowers of Dollis Hill" removed from work on Colossus for "squandering good valves".

Despite the success of Colossus, the Heath Robinson approach was still valuable for solving certain problems. The final development of the concept was a machine called Super Robinson that was designed by Tommy Flowers. This one could run four tapes and was used for running depths and "cribs" or known-plaintext attack runs.

Flowers gained full backing for his project from the director of the Post Office Research Station at Dollis Hill, W. G. Radley. With the highest priority for acquisition of parts, Flowers's team at Dollis Hill built the first machine in eleven months. It was immediately dubbed 'Colossus' by the Bletchley Park staff for its immense proportions. The Mark 1 Colossus operated five times faster and was more flexible than the previous system, named Heath Robinson, which used electro-mechanical switches. The first Mark 1, with 1500 valves, ran at Dollis Hill in November 1943; it was delivered to Bletchley Park in January 1944 where it was assembled and began operation in early February. The algorithms used by Colossus were developed by W. T. Tutte and his team of mathematicians. Colossus proved to be efficient and quick against the twelve-rotor Lorenz cipher SZ42 machine.

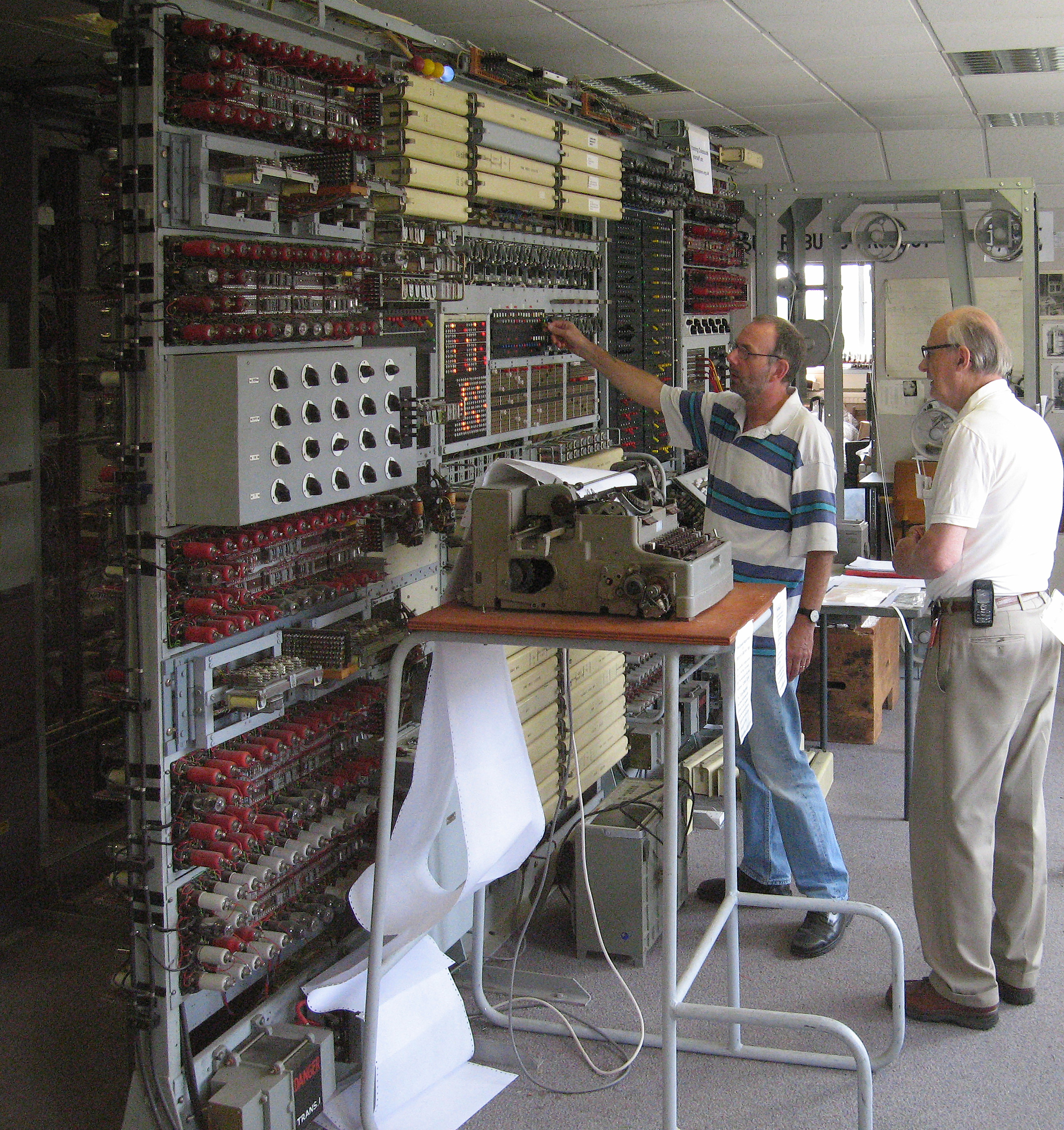
In 1994, a team led by Tony Sale (right) began a reconstruction of a Colossus at Bletchley Park. Here, in 2006, Sale supervises the breaking of an enciphered message with the completed machine.

In anticipation of a need for additional computers, Flowers was already working on Colossus Mark 2 which would employ 2,400 valves. The first Mark 2 went into service at Bletchley Park on 1 June 1944 and immediately produced vital information for the imminent D-Day landings planned for Monday 5 June (postponed 24 hours by bad weather). Flowers later described a crucial meeting between Dwight D. Eisenhower and his staff on 5 June, during which a courier entered and handed Eisenhower a note summarising a Colossus decrypt. This confirmed that Adolf Hitler wanted no additional troops moved to Normandy, as he was still convinced that the preparations for the Normandy landings were a feint. Handing back the decrypt, Eisenhower announced to his staff, "We go tomorrow". Earlier, a report from Field Marshal Erwin Rommel on the western defences was decoded by Colossus and revealed that one of the sites chosen as the drop site for a US parachute division was the base for a German tank division, so the site was changed.

Ten Colossuses were completed and used during the Second World War in British decoding efforts and an eleventh was ready for commissioning at the end of the war. All but two were dismantled at the end of the war, "The remaining two were moved to a British Intelligence department, GCHQ in Cheltenham, Gloucestershire, where they may have played a significant part in the codebreaking operations of the Cold War". They were finally decommissioned in 1959 and 1960.

== Post-war work and retirement ==
After the war, Flowers received little recognition for his contribution to cryptanalysis. Flowers was left in debt after the war after using his own personal funds to build Colossus. The government granted him £1,000 payment which did not cover Flowers' personal investment in the equipment; he shared much of the money amongst the staff who had helped him build and test Colossus. Flowers applied for a loan from the Bank of England to build another machine like Colossus but was denied the loan because the bank did not believe that such a machine could work. He could not argue that he had already designed and built many of these machines because his work on Colossus was covered by the Official Secrets Act. He remained at the Post Office Research Station where he was Head of the Switching Division. He and his group pioneered work on all-electronic telephone exchanges, completing a basic design by about 1950, which led on to the Highgate Wood Telephone Exchange. He was also involved in the development of ERNIE. In 1964, he became head of the advanced development at Standard Telephones and Cables Ltd., where he continued to develop electronic telephone switching including a pulse amplitude modulation exchange, retiring in 1969.

It was not until the 1970s that Flowers' work in computing was fully acknowledged. His family had known only that he had done some 'secret and important' work.

In 1976, he published Introduction to Exchange Systems, a book on the engineering principles of telephone exchanges.

Flowers died in 1998 aged 92, leaving a wife and two sons.

== Legacy ==
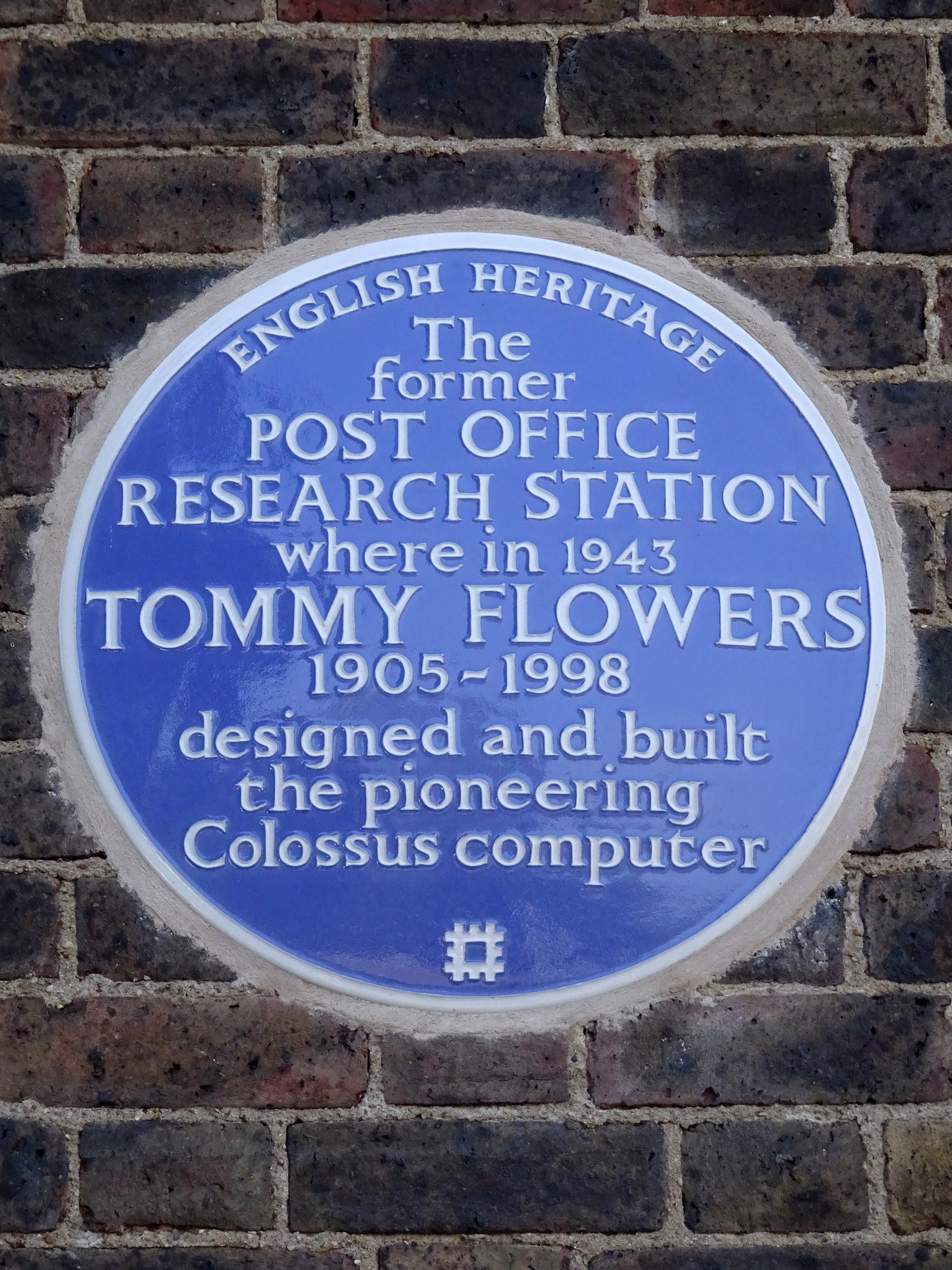
English Heritage blue plaque on the former Post Office Research Station building in Dollis Hill

Flowers is commemorated at the Post Office Research Station site, which became a housing development, with the main building converted into a block of flats and an access road called Flowers Close. He was honoured by London Borough of Tower Hamlets, where he was born. An Information and Communications Technology (ICT) centre for young people, the Tommy Flowers Centre, opened there in November 2010. The centre has closed but the building is now the Tommy Flowers Centre, part of the Tower Hamlets Pupil Referral Unit. In 2023, English Heritage placed a blue plaque here in his honour.

In September 2012, his wartime diary was put on display at Bletchley Park. A road in Kesgrave, near the current BT Research Laboratories, is named Tommy Flowers Drive.

On 12 December 2013, 70 years after he created Colossus, his legacy was honoured with a memorial commissioned by British Telecom (BT), successor to Post Office Telephones. The life-size bronze bust, designed by James Butler, was unveiled by Trevor Baylis at Adastral Park, BT's research and development centre in Martlesham Heath, near Ipswich, Suffolk. BT also began a computer science scholarship and award in his name.

On 29 September 2016, BT opened the Tommy Flowers Institute for ICT training at Adastral Park to support the development of postgraduates transferring into industry. The institute focuses on bringing ICT-sector organisations together with academic researchers to solve some of the challenges facing UK businesses, exploring areas such as cybersecurity, big data, autonomics and converged networks. The launch event was attended by professors from Cambridge, Oxford, East Anglia, Essex, Imperial, UCL, Southampton, Surrey, and Lancaster as well as representatives from the National Physical Laboratory, Huawei, Ericsson, CISCO, ARM and ADVA.

In 2018, a room in the newly refurbished Institution of Engineering and Technology in London was named the Flowers Room.

=== Colossus rebuild ===
A functioning Colossus Mark II was rebuilt by a team of volunteers led by Tony Sale between 1993 and 2008. It is on display at The National Museum of Computing at Bletchley Park.

Flowers knew that Sale was rebuilding a MKII version, describing the design and construction which was instrumental in its reconstruction.

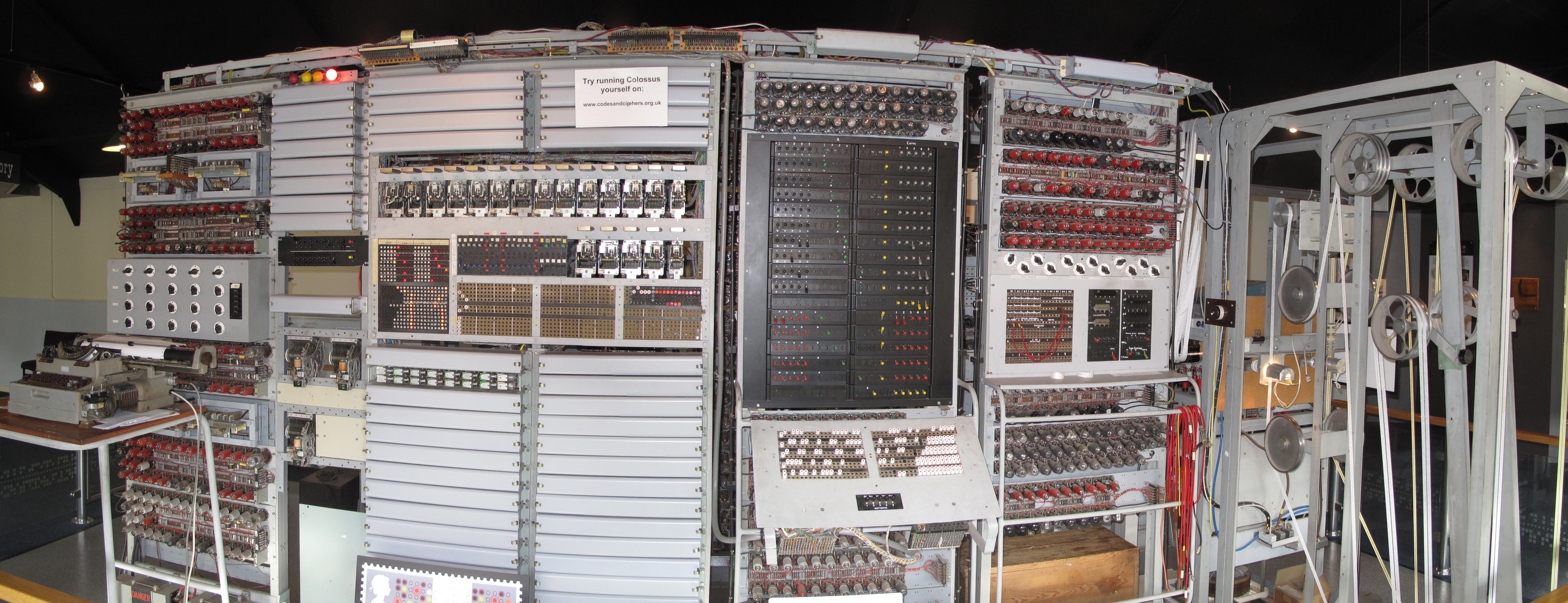
Front view of the Colossus rebuild showing, from right to left (1) The "bedstead" containing the message tape in its continuous loop and with a second one loaded. (2) The J-rack containing the Selection Panel and Plug Panel. (3) The K-rack with the large "Q" switch panel and sloping patch panel. (4) The double S-rack containing the control panel and, above the image of a postage stamp, five two-line counter displays. (5) The electric typewriter in front of the five sets of four "set total" decade switches in the C-rack.

== Honours ==
On 2 June 1943, Flowers was made a Member of the Order of the British Empire.

- 1973: Awarded an honorary Doctor of Science by Newcastle University.
- 1983: The first winner of the Martlesham Medal in recognition of his achievements in computing.
- 1993: Received a certificate from Hendon College, having completed a basic course in information processing on a personal computer.

== See also ==
- List of pioneers in computer science

== Bibliography ==
- Copeland, B. Jack, ed. (2006). Colossus: The Secrets of Bletchley Park's Codebreaking Computers. Oxford: Oxford University Press. ISBN 978-0-19-284055-4.
- Erskine, Ralph; Smith, Michael, eds. (2011), The Bletchley Park Codebreakers, Biteback Publishing Ltd, ISBN 978-1-84954-078-0 Updated and extended version of Action This Day: From Breaking of the Enigma Code to the Birth of the Modern Computer Bantam Press 2001
- Gannon, Paul (2006). Colossus: Bletchley Park's Greatest Secret. London: Atlantic Books. ISBN 1-84354-330-3.
- Flowers, Thomas H. (2006). D-Day at Bletchley Park. chapter in Copeland 2006, pp. 78–83
- Price, David A. (2021). Geniuses at War: Bletchley Park, Colossus, and the Dawn of the Digital Age. New York: Knopf. ISBN 978-0-525-52154-9.
- Randell, Brian (2006). Of Men and Machines. chapter in Copeland 2006, pp. 141–149
- Smith, Michael (1999) [1998], Station X: The Codebreakers of Bletchley Park, Channel 4 Books, ISBN 978-0-7522-2189-2
