= Ralph Tester =

British accountant and administrator

Ralph Paterson Tester (2 June 1902 – 1 May 1998) was an administrator at Bletchley Park, the British codebreaking station during World War II. He founded and supervised a section named the Testery for breaking Tunny (a Fish cipher).

== Background ==
The Lorenz cipher machine had twelve wheels, and was thus most advanced, complex, faster and far more secure than the three-wheeled Enigma. Lorenz was used to encipher top-secret messages between German Army H.Q. in Berlin, and the top generals and field-marshals on all fronts, including Adolf Hitler himself.

== Career ==
Before World War II, Tester was an accountant who had worked extensively in Germany and as a result was very familiar with the German language and culture. He held a senior position in the accountancy division of Unilever. On the outbreak of war, he worked for the BBC Monitoring Service which listened in to German public radio broadcasts.

== Bletchley Park ==
Tester was recruited to Bletchley Park, and during later 1941 became the head of a small group working on a double Playfair cipher used by German military police. The Testery was set up in July 1942 under his command. The three other original founding members, cryptographers and linguists, were: Capt. Jerry Roberts, Peter Ericsson and Maj. Denis Oswald. All four were fluent in German. The Testery used hand methods to break messages enciphered on Tunny traffic. The Testery decoded 1.5 million messages by hand within one year of its foundation. By the war's end in May 1945, the Testery had grown to nine cryptographers, with a total staff of 118 organised in three shifts.

A former Testery senior codebreaker and shift leader Jerry Roberts, recalls that, "The imperturbable, pipe-smoking Tester spoke fluent German, but did not pretend to be a codebreaker. The atmosphere in his unit was always positive and friendly, and the personnel were well selected—Tester seemed to find the right niche for everybody. Thanks to Tester's influence the work of the Testery was very well organised."

Towards the end of the European war, Tester was part of a TICOM team, a mission sent to Germany to discover information about their communications technology, including TUNNY machines.

After the war, Tester returned to Unilever.

== See also ==
- Cryptanalysis of the Lorenz cipher
- Testery
- Newmanry
- Bill Tutte
