= Fish (cryptography) =

Allied codename for Nazi German teleprinter stream ciphers

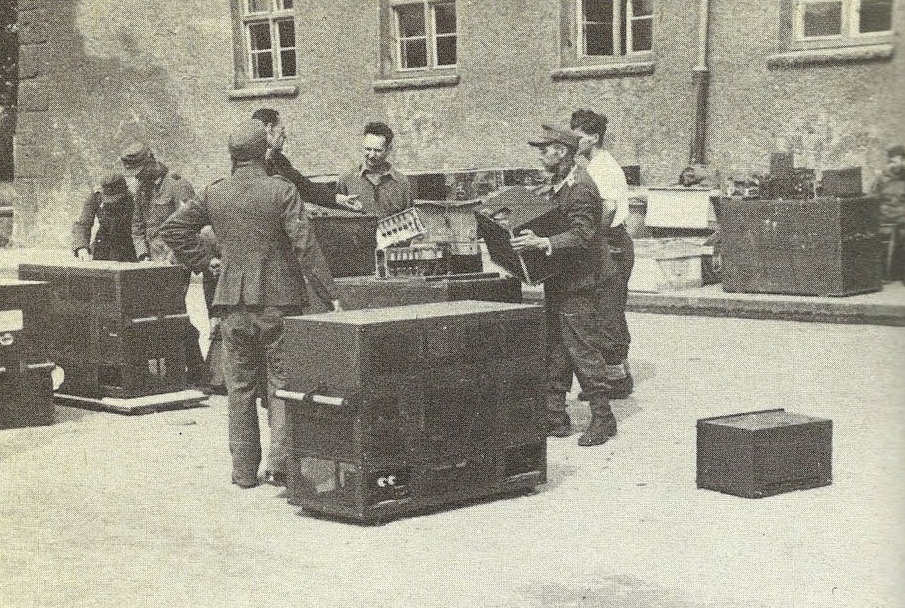
German prisoners prepare the "Russian Fish" for loading and shipment to England.

Fish (sometimes capitalised as FISH) was the UK's Government Code and Cypher School (GC&CS) Bletchley Park codename for any of several German teleprinter stream ciphers used during World War II. Enciphered teleprinter traffic was used between German High Command and Army Group commanders in the field, so its intelligence value (Ultra) was of the highest strategic value to the Allies. This traffic normally passed over landlines, but as German forces extended their geographic reach beyond western Europe, they had to resort to wireless transmission.

Bletchley Park decrypts of messages enciphered with the Enigma machines revealed that the Germans called one of their wireless teleprinter transmission systems "Sägefisch" ('sawfish') which led British cryptographers to refer to encrypted German radiotelegraphic traffic as "Fish." The code "Tunny" ('tuna') was the name given to the first non-Morse link, and it was subsequently used for the Lorenz SZ machines and the traffic enciphered by them.

== History ==
In June 1941, the British "Y" wireless intercept stations, as well as receiving Enigma-enciphered Morse code traffic, started to receive non-Morse traffic which was initially called NoMo. NoMo1 was a German army link between Berlin and Athens, and NoMo2 a temporary air force link between Berlin and Königsberg. The parallel Enigma-enciphered link to NoMo2, which was being read by Government Code and Cypher School at Bletchley Park, revealed that the Germans called the wireless teleprinter transmission systems "Sägefisch" (sawfish). This led the British to use the code Fish dubbing the machine and its traffic Tunny.

The enciphering/deciphering equipment was called a Geheimschreiber (secret writer) which, like Enigma, used a symmetrical substitution alphabet. The teleprinter code used was the International Telegraph Alphabet No. 2 (ITA2)—Murray's modification of the 5-bit Baudot code.

When the Germans invaded Russia, during World War II, the Germans began to use a new type of enciphered transmission between central headquarters and headquarters in the field. The transmissions were known as Fish at Bletchley Park. (See Lorenz cipher, Cryptanalysis of the Lorenz cipher.) The German army used Fish for communications between the highest authorities in Berlin and the high-ranking officials of the German Army in the field. The Fish traffic which the personnel at Bletchley Park intercepted, contained discussions, orders, situation reports and many more details about the intentions of the German Army. However, these transmissions were so challenging to decrypt that even with the assistance of the high speed Colossus computer, the messages could not be read until several days later. “Vital intelligence was obtained about Hitler’s intentions in the run up to D-Day 1944.”

== Traffic code names ==
=== Tunny ===
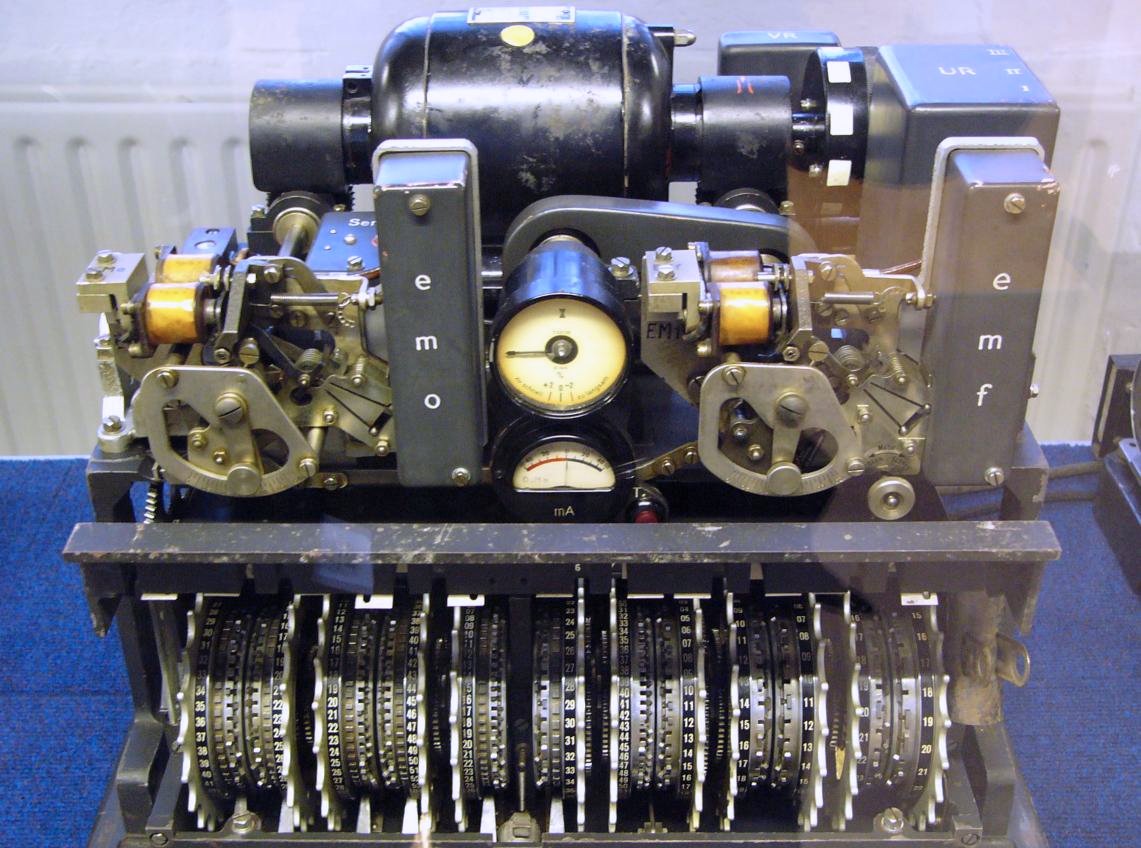
The Lorenz SZ42 machine with its covers removed. Bletchley Park museum

The NoMo1 link was initially named Tunny (for tunafish), a name which went on to be used both for the Lorenz SZ40/42 machines and for the Bletchley Park analogues of them. The NoMo1 link was subsequently renamed Codfish. A large number of Tunny links were monitored by the Y-station at Knockholt and given names of fish. Most of these were between the Oberkommando der Wehrmacht (German High Command, OKW) in Berlin and German army commands throughout occupied Europe.

The Tunny links were based on two central transmitting and receiving points in Strausberg near Berlin for Army generals in the West and one in Königsberg in Prussia for the Eastern Front. The number of radio links jumped from eight in mid-1943 to fourteen or fifteen. In 1941 the initial experimental Tunny link was between Berlin and Athens/Salonoka. By D-Day in 1944 there were twenty-six links, based on Konigsberg and Straussberg. Other links were usually mobile; in two trucks, one with radio equipment and one with a "send" Tunny machine and a receive "Tunny" machine. The links carried very high-grade intelligence: messages from Hitler and the High Command to various Army Group commanders in the field.

Cryptanalysis of the Lorenz cipher at Bletchley Park was assisted initially by a machine called Heath Robinson, and later by the Colossus computers, which yielded a great deal of valuable high-level intelligence.

Bletchley Park names of Tunny links
Name	Between	
Bream	Berlin	Rome
Herring	Rome	Tunis
Jellyfish	Berlin	Paris
Grilse	Berlin	La Roche
Mullet	Berlin	Oslo
Turbot	Berlin	Copenhagen
Dace	Berlin	Königsberg
Whiting	Königsberg	Riga
Perch	Königsberg	Central Belarusse
Squid	Königsberg	N Ukraine
Octopus	Königsberg	E Ukraine
Stickleback	Königsberg	S Ukraine
Smelt	E Ukraine	S Ukraine
Grayling	Königsberg	Belgrade
Tarpon	Berlin	Bucharest
Gurnard	Berlin	Belgrade
Chubb	Belgrade	Salonica
Flounder	Salonika	Rhodes
Codfish	Berlin	Salonika

Tunny decrypts provided high-grade intelligence in an unprecedented quality. Walter Jacobs, a US Army codebreaker who worked at Bletchley Park, wrote in an official report on the operation to break Tunny that in March 1945 alone 'upward of five million letters of current transmission, containing intelligence of the highest order, were deciphered'.

=== Sturgeon ===
This was the name given to traffic encoded with the Siemens and Halske T52 Geheimschreiber. In May 1940, after the German invasion of Norway, the Swedish mathematician and cryptographer Arne Beurling used traffic intercepted from telegraph lines that passed through Sweden to break this cipher. Although Bletchley Park eventually diagnosed and broke Sturgeon, the relatively low value of the intelligence gained, compared to the effort involved, meant that they did not read much of its traffic.

=== Thrasher ===
This was the name used for traffic enciphered on a Geheimschreiber that was probably the Siemens T43 one-time tape machine. This was used only on a few circuits, in the later stages of the war and was diagnosed at Bletchley Park, but considered to be unbreakable.

== List of senior staff involved at Bletchley Park ==
Including both executives and cryptographers on FISH (Tunny) in the Testery.

Ralph Tester — linguist and head of the Testery

- Peter Benenson — codebreaker
- John Christie — codebreaker
- Tom Colvill — general manager
- Peter Edgerley — codebreaker
- Peter Ericsson — shift-leader, linguist and senior codebreaker
- Peter Hilton — codebreaker and mathematician
- Roy Jenkins — codebreaker and later cabinet minister
- Victor Masters — shift-leader
- Max Newman — mathematician and codebreaker who later set up the Newmanry
- Denis Oswald — linguist and senior codebreaker
- Jerry Roberts — shift-leader, linguist and senior codebreaker
- John Thompson — codebreaker
- John Tiltman — senior codebreaker and intelligence officer
- Alan Turing - mathematician, mainly on Enigma traffic
- W.T. Tutte — codebreaker and mathematician

== See also ==
- Colossus (computer)
- Heath Robinson (codebreaking machine)
- TICOM
- Turingery
