= Testery =

Section at Bletchley Park

The Testery was a section at Bletchley Park, the British codebreaking station during World War II. It was set up in July 1942 as the "FISH Subsection" under Major Ralph Tester, hence its alternative name. Four founder members were Tester himself and three senior cryptanalysts: Captain Jerry Roberts, Captain Peter Ericsson and Major Denis Oswald. All four were fluent in German. From 1 July 1942 on, this team switched and was tasked with breaking the German High Command's most top-level code Tunny after Bill Tutte successfully broke Tunny system in Spring 1942.

== Methods ==
The Testery used hand decrypting methods to break Tunny traffic. Within one year of its foundation, the Testery had deciphered 1.5 million texts by these methods. By the war's end in Europe in May 1945, the Testery had grown to nine cryptanalysts, a team of 24 ATS, a total staff of 118, organised in three shifts working round the clock.

The logical structure of the Tunny system was worked out by mathematician Bill Tutte in the spring of 1942. Tunny had 12 wheels, and was more advanced, complex, faster and far more secure than the well-known 3-4 wheeled Enigma machine. The Germans were convinced that the Tunny cipher system was unbreakable. Tunny was the cipher system which carried only the highest grade of intelligence: messages from the German Army Headquarters in Berlin and the top generals and field marshals on all fronts. Some were signed by Hitler himself. Tens of thousands of Tunny messages were intercepted by the British and broken at Bletchley Park by Captain Roberts and his fellow codebreakers in the Testery. These messages contained much vital insight into top-level German thinking and planning.

After the Testery had been breaking Tunny for a year by hand, the Newmanry became active from July 1943 under Max Newman. Mathematicians in the Newmanry used machine methods to speed up breaking Tunny. Early on, a machine called Heath Robinson was produced, to help speed up one stage – breaking of the chi wheels, but the Robinson was slow and not reliable. In February 1944 a new machine called "Colossus" became operational; it was the world's first electronic computer. Colossus was designed and built in only ten months by Tommy Flowers of the G.P.O. (Post Office). This had far greater capacity and speed than the Robinson and so the whole breaking process became much faster. The Colossus was essential for making the very fast counts needed to work out the "de-chis", but the psi-wheels and motor-wheels were still broken by hand in the Testery.

The Testery was hand code-breaking Tunny for 12 months before the Robinson machine was produced and for 19 months before Colossus operated. With the help of the Newmanry, the Testery broke up to 90% of the traffic given to them to work on in the Colossus period.

The information provided by Tunny enabled the Allies to ascertain German movements, saving thousands of lives at critical junctures such as D-Day and the Battle of Kursk in the Soviet Union. General Dwight D. Eisenhower gave the best summary after World War II. He said that "Bletchley decrypts shortened the War by at least two years". Tunny played a very important role in all of this, a war which was costing at least 10 million lives a year. A great deal of this was down to Bill Tutte.

The story of Enigma (declassified in the 1970s) is well known, but the story of Tunny, Germany's top-secret cipher machine, was only declassified in the 2000s. Most of the cryptanalysts in the Testery died before they could tell their stories. For the first time, on 25 October 2011, a BBC Timewatch programme titled Code-breakers: Bletchley Park's Lost Heroes, about the Testery, Tunny, Bill Tutte and Tommy Flowers, was produced, featuring testimony from Jerry Roberts.

== List of senior executives and codebreakers on Tunny in the Testery ==
- Ralph Tester: linguist and head of Testery (not a codebreaker)
- Peter Benenson: codebreaker
- John Christie: codebreaker
- Tom Colvill: general manager
- Peter Edgerley: codebreaker
- Peter Ericsson: shift-leader, linguist and senior codebreaker
- Peter Hilton: codebreaker and mathematician; joint appointment with the Newmanry
- Roy Jenkins: codebreaker (later moved on to be a wheel setter)
- Victor Masters: shift-leader (not a codebreaker)
- Donald Michie: codebreaker; joint appointment with the Newmanry
- Denis Oswald: linguist and senior codebreaker
- Jerry Roberts: shift-leader, linguist and senior codebreaker
- Jack Thompson: codebreaker

By the war's end in Europe in May 1945, the Testery had grown to nine cryptanalysts, a team of 24 ATS, a total staff of 118, organised in three shifts working round the clock.

== See also ==
- Allen Coombs
- Cryptanalysis of the Lorenz cipher
- Cryptanalysis of the Enigma

== Bibliography ==
- Roberts, Jerry (2006), "Major Tester's Section: The significance of breaking Tunny", in Copeland, B. Jack (ed.), Colossus: The Secrets of Bletchley Park's Codebreaking Computers, Oxford: Oxford University Press, pp. 249–259, ISBN 978-0-19-284055-4
- Gannon, Paul (2006), Colossus: Bletchley Park's Greatest Secret, London: Atlantic Books, ISBN 978-1-84354-331-2
- Good, Jack; Michie, Donald; Timms, Geoffrey (1945), General Report on Tunny: With Emphasis on Statistical Methods, UK Public Record Office HW 25/4 and HW 25/5 That version is a facsimile copy, but there is a transcript of much of this document in '.pdf' format at: Sale, Tony (2001), Part of the "General Report on Tunny", the Newmanry History, formatted by Tony Sale (PDF), and a web transcript of Part 1 at: Ellsbury, Graham, General Report on Tunny With Emphasis on Statistical Methods
- Kenyon, David (2019), Bletchley Park and D-Day: The Untold Story of How the Battle for Normandy Was Won, Yale University Press, ISBN 978-0-300-24357-4
