= Denis Oswald (codebreaker) =

English cricketer, educator, and codebreaker

Personal information
- Full name: Denis Geoffrey Oswald
- Born: 12 November 1910; Stanley, Falkland Islands
- Died: 5 February 1998 (aged 87); Uppingham, Rutland, England
- Batting: Right-handed

Domestic team information
- Years: Team
- 1931: Oxford University
- 1931–1932: Hertfordshire

Career statistics
Competition	First-class
Matches	2
Runs scored	21
Batting average	21.00
100s/50s	–/–
Top score	16
Catches/stumpings	–/–
- Source: Cricinfo, 7 July 2019

Denis Geoffrey Oswald (12 November 1910 – 5 February 1998) was an English first-class cricketer, educator, and codebreaker. Born in the Falkland Islands, he moved to England with his family at a young age. He was educated at St Lawrence College, Ramsgate and Wadham College, Oxford. During his stay at Oxford, he made two first-class appearances for the Oxford University Cricket Club. After graduating, he became an educator at Uppingham School. During his time at the school, he served in the Intelligence Corps during the Second World War and was a codebreaker in Bletchley Park.

== Early life and first-class cricket ==
Denis Geoffrey Oswald was born on 12 November 1910 in Stanley, the Falkland Islands, to Louis Victor Oswald and Lillian Gertrude Oswald. He had a younger sister named Irene. He left the Falklands for England with his family when he was 8 years old aboard the SS Inca in 1919. He was educated in England at St Lawrence College, Ramsgate, before going up to Wadham College, Oxford. While studying at Oxford, he made two appearances in first-class cricket for Oxford University in 1931, playing against Leicestershire and the touring New Zealanders at Oxford.

In addition to playing first-class cricket, Oswald also played minor counties cricket for Hertfordshire in 1931 and 1932, making a total of nine appearances in the Minor Counties Championship. After graduating from Oxford in 1932, Oswald took up the post of languages teacher at Uppingham School. During his time as a teacher, he was the Meadhurst Housemaster from 1946 to 1961. He remained a teacher at the school until 1974.

== Bletchley Park and later life ==
Oswald served in the Intelligence Corps during the Second World War, initially as a private. He was commissioned as a second lieutenant in June 1941. In Autumn 1942, Oswald, alongside Ralph Tester, Jerry Roberts and Peter Ericsson, founded the Testery section at Bletchley Park. That same year, they had deciphered 1.5 million messages to provide information to the Allies regarding the German Army's plans.

Oswald later died on 5 February 1998 in Uppingham, Rutland, England, at the age of 87.
