= Jerry Roberts =

British businessman and wartime codebreaker (1920–2014)

Jerry Roberts MBE
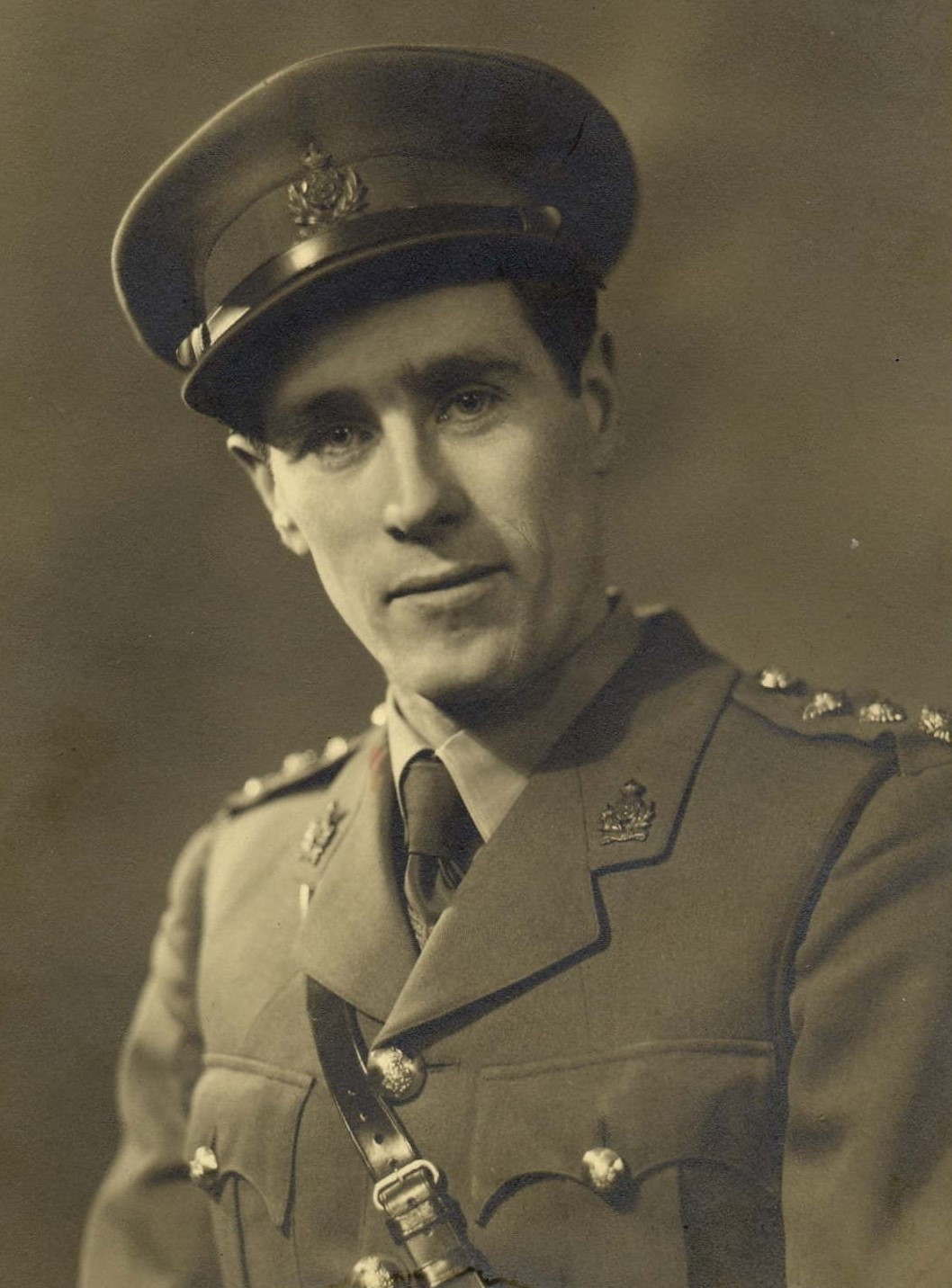
- Capt. Jerry Roberts MBE photographed at Bletchley Park where he worked from 1941–45. He was a linguist and leading codebreaker on the Cryptanalysis of the Lorenz cipher.
- Born: 18 November 1920; Wembley, London, England, UK
- Died: 25 March 2014 (aged 93); Hampshire, England, UK
- Education: University College London 1939–1941 in German and French
- Occupations: Business owner. Wartime codebreaker and linguist on the Lorenz cipher system

The voice of Captain Jerry Roberts MBE
recorded October 2012

Captain Raymond C. "Jerry" Roberts MBE (18 November 1920 – 25 March 2014) was a British wartime codebreaker and businessman. During the Second World War, Roberts worked at the Government Code and Cypher School at Bletchley Park from 1941 to 1945. He was a leading codebreaker and linguist, who worked on the Lorenz cipher system – Hitler's most top-level code.

Jerry Roberts was born in Wembley, London. His father Herbert, had trained as a pharmacist, but worked for Lloyds Bank head office in the City for the rest of his 40-year career, since coming to London from Wales in 1915. His mother, Leticia, was a pianist and an organist who played in the local chapel. He was educated at Latymer Upper School, Hammersmith in London 1933–39 and University College London 1939–41. He gained a degree in German and French.

== War service ==
Early in the Second World War, his tutor at University College London, Prof. Leonard Willoughby, who had worked during the First World War in Room 40, the main cipher-breaking unit of that time, recommended the twenty-year-old Roberts as a German linguist to the Government Code and Cypher School at Bletchley Park where he was interviewed and accepted by Colonel John Tiltman as a codebreaker and linguist.

Roberts was one of the four founding members of the Testery at Bletchley Park; the other two senior cryptanalysts were Major Denis Oswald and Captain Peter Ericsson, whilst head of the unit, Major Ralph Tester, was a linguist but not cryptanalyst. The Testery was tasked with breaking the Lorenz cipher code, named "Tunny" by the British. This was the Nazis' highest-level communications cipher system, which was used for communications between the Germany Army High Command in Berlin and their Army Commands in the field throughout occupied Europe, some of which were signed "Adolf Hitler, Führer". The cipher was Adolf Hitler's most secret code system and had 12 wheels against well-known 3 wheel Enigma; it was declassified in 2002, compared with Enigma in the 1970s.

Roberts worked in the Testery until the end of the war, by which time it had grown to nine cryptanalysts, a team of 24 ATS women, and a total staff of 118. Work was organised in three shifts working round the clock. Roberts was one of the three shift-leaders For the first year, the messages that were broken by hand amounted to 1.5 million pieces. The Newmanry, which became active in July 1943, developed and used machine methods to help speed up one stage – breaking of the chi-wheels but the psi-wheels and motor-wheels were still broken by hand in the Testery. From mid-1943 onwards, the Testery is credited with breaking over 90% of Lorenz traffic.

Tens of thousands of Lorenz messages were intercepted by the British and broken at Bletchley Park by Roberts and his fellow code-breakers in the Testery. These messages contained much vital insight into top-level German thinking and planning. Tunny provided vital information that changed the course of the war in Europe and saved tens of millions of lives at critical junctures – such as the Battle of Kursk in the Soviet Union, and D-Day. General Dwight Eisenhower (later the U.S President 1953–61) said after the war "Bletchley decrypts shortened the war by at least 2 years".

== Postwar ==
After the war, Roberts was a member of the War Crimes Investigation Unit. There he employed his fluency in the German and French languages while working in the British Zone, interviewing witnesses and victims for various cases and taking legal statements from them for use in court.

Thereafter, from 1948, Roberts pursued a new career in market research for 50 years. He initially worked for Market Information Services (MIS), a leading market research firm, in London. Between 1954 and 1959 he was based in Caracas, Venezuela, where he set up the first general research company in South America, learned to speak fluent Spanish and developed the company DATOS.

Roberts spent 1960 in New York as a manager representing a major international advertising agency (CPV). Then, from 1961 to 1969, he was based in London as board director of M.I.S.

In 1970, Roberts formed his own market research companies (one for the UK, one for the rest of Europe). These were sold to GfK NOP (National Opinion Polls) in 1993. He continued working as a consultant to NOP assisting with multi-country studies until he was nearly 80. He used his skill in languages in his work, pioneering multi-country market research studies across Europe for leading UK and multinational companies. He carried out market research for a wide range of leading UK and international clients in the fields of product marketing, public opinion and media research. His clients included British Gas, Reebok trainers, DuPont Teflon, Lycra, American Airlines, Chrysler cars, Holiday Inn hotels and many others.

== In retirement ==
Roberts was the last survivor of the nine cryptanalysts who worked on Lorenz cipher. For the last six years of his life, he campaigned for proper recognition for Bletchley Park's "4Ts" — for his colleagues in the Testery, and especially for its three "heroes": Alan Turing who broke the naval Enigma, Bill Tutte who broke the Lorenz cipher to help shorten the war, and Tommy Flowers who designed and built the Colossus, the world's first large-scale electronic, digital, programmable computer — to vastly speed up the chi-wheel stage of the breaking of Tunny traffic. The other five stages of the work were performed by hand in the Testery by codebreakers and support staff.

Roberts was honoured several times for his achievements. In July 2011, he was presented to Queen Elizabeth II at Bletchley Park. Roberts was featured in a BBC Timewatch Special titled Code-Breakers: Bletchley Park's Lost Heroes, first broadcast on BBC Two on 25 October 2011. In 2013, he received an MBE New Years Honours List and awarded a University College London Honorary Fellowship. The same year, he was also honoured with an investiture stamp, which is available through Bletchley Park Post Office.

Roberts accepted all of these accolades as acknowledgment not of his own accomplishments, but of the work of his teammates at Bletchley Park, most of whom died unrecognised, before Tunny was declassified.

Roberts' autobiography was published in March 2017, titled Lorenz: Breaking Hitler's top secret code at Bletchley-Park.
