= I. J. Good =

British statistician and cryptographer (1916–2009)

- Born: Isadore Jacob Gudak; 9 December 1916; London, England, United Kingdom
- Died: 5 April 2009 (aged 92); Radford, Virginia, United States
- Education: Jesus College, Cambridge (MA, PhD)
- Known for: Good–Thomas algorithm Good–Toulmin estimator Good–Turing frequency estimation Black hole cosmology Intelligence explosion
- Awards: Smith's Prize (1940)
- Scientific career
- Fields: Statistician, cryptologist
- Workplaces: Trinity College, Oxford; Virginia Tech
- Doctoral advisor: G. H. Hardy

Irving John Good (9 December 1916 – 5 April 2009) was a British mathematician who worked as a cryptologist at Bletchley Park with Alan Turing. After the Second World War, Good continued to work with Turing on the design of computers and Bayesian statistics at the University of Manchester. Good moved to the United States where he was a professor at Virginia Tech.

He was born Isadore Jacob Gudak to a Polish Jewish family in London. He later anglicised his name to Irving John Good and signed his publications "I. J. Good."

An originator of the concept known as the intelligence explosion, Good served as consultant on supercomputers to Stanley Kubrick, director of the 1968 film 2001: A Space Odyssey.

== Life ==
Good was born Isadore Jacob Gudak to Polish Jewish parents in London. His father was a watchmaker, who later managed and owned a successful fashionable jewellery shop, and was also a notable Yiddish writer writing under the pen name of Moshe Oved. Good was educated at the Haberdashers' Aske's Boys' School, at the time in Hampstead in northwest London, where, according to Dan van der Vat, Good effortlessly outpaced the mathematics curriculum.

Good studied mathematics at Jesus College, Cambridge, graduating in 1938 and winning the Smith's Prize in 1940. He did research under G. H. Hardy and Abram Besicovitch before moving to Bletchley Park in 1941 on completing his doctorate.

=== Bletchley Park ===
On 27 May 1941, having just obtained his doctorate at Cambridge, Good walked into Hut 8, Bletchley's facility for breaking German naval ciphers, for his first shift. This was the day that Britain's Royal Navy destroyed the German battleship Bismarck after it had sunk the Royal Navy's HMS Hood. Bletchley had contributed to Bismarck's destruction by discovering, through wireless-traffic analysis, that the German flagship was sailing for Brest, France, rather than Wilhelmshaven, from which she had set out. Hut 8 had not, however, been able to decrypt on a current basis the 22 German Naval Enigma messages that had been sent to Bismarck. The German Navy's Enigma cyphers were considerably more secure than those of the German Army or Air Force, which had been well penetrated by 1940. Naval messages were taking three to seven days to decrypt, which usually made them operationally useless for the British. This was about to change, however, with Good's help.

Alan Turing... had caught Good sleeping on the floor while on duty during his first night shift. At first, Turing thought Good was ill, but he was cross when Good explained that he was just taking a short nap because he was tired. For days afterwards, Turing would not deign to speak to Good, and he left the room if Good walked in. The new recruit only won Turing's respect after he solved the bigram tables problem. During a subsequent night shift, when there was no more work to be done, it dawned on Good that there might be another chink in the German indicating system. The German telegraphists had to add dummy letters to the trigrams which they selected out of the Kenngruppenbuch... Good wondered if their choice of dummy letters was random, or whether there was a bias towards particular letters. After inspecting some messages which had been broken, he discovered that there was a tendency to use some letters more than others. That being the case, all the codebreakers had to do, was to work back from the indicators given at the beginning of each message, and apply each bigram table in turn in the same way as Joan Clarke had done before. The bigram table which produced one of the popular dummy letters was probably the correct one. When Good mentioned his discovery to Alan Turing, Turing was very embarrassed, and said, 'I could have sworn that I tried that.' It quickly became an important part of the Banburismus procedure. Jack Good's refusal to go on working when tired was vindicated by a subsequent incident. During another long night shift, he had been baffled by his failure to break a doubly enciphered Offizier message. This was one of the messages which was supposed to be enciphered initially with the Enigma set up in accordance with the Offizier settings, and subsequently with the general Enigma settings in place. However, while he was sleeping before returning for another shift, he dreamed that the order had been reversed; the general settings had been applied before the Offizier settings. Next day he found that the message had yet to be read, so he applied the theory which had come to him during the night. It worked; he had broken the code in his sleep.

Good served with Turing for nearly two years. Subsequently, he worked with Donald Michie in Max Newman's group on the Fish ciphers, leading to the development of the Colossus computer.

Good was a member of the Bletchley Chess Club which defeated the Oxford University Chess Club 8–4 in a twelve-board team match held on 2 December 1944. Good played fourth board for Bletchley Park, with Conel Hugh O'Donel Alexander, Harry Golombek and James Macrae Aitken in the top three spots. He won his game against Sir Robert Robinson.

=== Postwar work ===
In 1947, Newman invited Good to join him and Turing at Manchester University. There, for three years, Good lectured in mathematics and researched computers, including the Manchester Mark 1.

In 1948, Good was recruited back to the Government Communications Headquarters (GCHQ). He remained there until 1959, while also taking up a brief associate professorship at Princeton University and a short consultancy with IBM.

From 1959 until he moved to the US in 1967, Good held government-funded positions and from 1964 a senior research fellowship at Trinity College, Oxford, and the Atlas Computer Laboratory, where he continued his interests in computing, statistics and chess. He later left Oxford, declaring it "a little stiff".

=== United States ===
In 1967, Good moved to the United States, where he was appointed a research professor of statistics at Virginia Polytechnic Institute and State University. In 1969, he was appointed a University Distinguished Professor at Virginia Tech, and in 1994 Emeritus University Distinguished Professor. In 1973, he was elected as a Fellow of the American Statistical Association.

He later said about his arrival in Virginia (from Britain) in 1967 to start teaching at VPI, where he taught from 1967 to 1994:

I arrived in Blacksburg in the seventh hour of the seventh day of the seventh month of the year seven in the seventh decade, and I was put in Apartment 7 of Block 7...all by chance.

== Research and publications ==
Good's published work ran to over three million words. He was known for his work on Bayesian statistics. Kass and Raftery credit Good (and in turn Turing) with coining the term Bayes factor. He is the first known person (in a document) to use the term "Baby" for the Manchester Baby. Good published a number of books on probability theory. In 1958, he published an early version of what later became known as the fast Fourier transform but it did not become widely known. He played chess to county standard and helped popularise Go, an Asian boardgame, through a 1965 article in New Scientist (he had learned the rules from Alan Turing). In 1965, he originated the concept now known as "intelligence explosion" or the "technological singularity", which anticipates the eventual advent of superhuman intelligence:

Let an ultraintelligent machine be defined as a machine that can far surpass all the intellectual activities of any man however clever. Since the design of machines is one of these intellectual activities, an ultraintelligent machine could design even better machines; there would then unquestionably be an 'intelligence explosion,' and the intelligence of man would be left far behind... Thus the first ultraintelligent machine is the last invention that man need ever make, provided that the machine is docile enough to tell us how to keep it under control. It is curious that this point is made so seldom outside of science fiction. It is sometimes worthwhile to take science fiction seriously.

Good's authorship of treatises such as his 1965 "Speculations Concerning the First Ultraintelligent Machine" and "Logic of Man and Machine" made him the obvious person for Stanley Kubrick (himself a keen chess player) to consult when filming 2001: A Space Odyssey (1968), one of whose principal characters was the paranoid HAL 9000 supercomputer. In 1995, Good was elected a member of the Academy of Motion Picture Arts and Sciences. Graphcore's proposed foundation model $600m computer, that uses Human-Centered Artificial Intelligence, which will have the potential capacity of running programs with 500trn parameters, was named to honor Good's intellectual heritage. (Note: The Stanford Institute for Human-Centered Artificial Intelligence's (HAI) Center for Research on Foundation Models (CRFM) describes foundation models as "models trained on broad data at scale...[that] will not only transform how AI systems are built, but will also lead to significant societal consequences." Examples of foundational models include BERT, GPT-3, CLIP, and Codex.) According to The Economist, Graphcore aims to take the "first step" towards creating I. J. Good's imagined "Ultraintelligent Machine".

According to his assistant, Leslie Pendleton, in 1998 Good wrote in an unpublished autobiographical statement that he suspected an ultraintelligent machine would lead to the extinction of man.

== Personality ==
Good published a paper under the names IJ Good and "K Caj Doog"—the latter, his own nickname spelled backwards. In a 1988 paper, he introduced its subject by saying, "Many people have contributed to this topic but I shall mainly review the writings of I. J. Good because I have read them all carefully." In Virginia he chose, as his vanity licence plate, "007IJG," in subtle reference to his Second World War intelligence work.

Good never married. After going through ten assistants in his first thirteen years at Virginia Tech, he hired Leslie Pendleton, who proved up to the task of managing his quirks. He wanted to marry her, but she refused. Although there was speculation, they were never more than friends, but she was his assistant, companion, and friend for the rest of his life.

== Death ==
Good died on 5 April 2009 of natural causes in Radford, Virginia, aged 92.

== Books ==
- Good, I. J. (1950), Probability and the Weighing of Evidence, London: Griffin, ASIN B0000CHL1R
- Good, Irving John (1965), The estimation of probabilities: An essay on modern Bayesian methods, Research monograph no. 30, M.I.T. Press, ASIN B0006BMRMM
- Good, Irving John (1962), The Scientist Speculates: An Anthology of Partly-Baked Ideas, Heinemann & Basic Books
- Osteyee, David Bridston; Good, Irving John (1974), Information, Weight of Evidence: The Singularity Between Probability Measures and Signal Detection, Springer, ISBN 978-3-540-06726-9
- Good, Irving John (2009) [1983], Good Thinking: The Foundations of Probability and Its Applications, Dover (2009); University of Minnesota Press (1983), ISBN 978-0-486-47438-0 (ISBN for 2009 pbk reprint)

== Significant papers ==
Good, I. J.. “Explicativity, corroboration, and the relative odds of hypotheses.” Synthese 30 (1975): 39–73.

== See also ==
- Good–Turing frequency estimation
- Cryptanalysis of the Enigma
- MacMahon Master theorem

== Bibliography ==
- Dan van der Vat, "Jack Good" (obituary), The Guardian, 29 April 2009, p. 32.
- Hugh Sebag-Montefiore, Enigma: The Battle for the Code, London, Weidenfeld & Nicolson, 2000, ISBN 978-0-297-84251-4.
