= Newmanry =

Section at Bletchley Park

The Newmanry was a section at Bletchley Park, the British codebreaking station during World War II. Its job was to develop and employ statistical and machine methods in cryptanalysis of the Lorenz cipher. It worked very closely with the Testery where a complementary set of operations were performed to complete the decryption of each message. Formally called the Statistical section, it was known as the Newmanry after its founder and head, Max Newman. It was responsible for the various Robinson machines and the ten Colossus computers. Some of the cryptanalysts had joint appointments with the Testery.

Initially in June 1943 the section was small: Good, Mitchie, two engineers and sixteen Wrens in a small hut. By the end of the war there were 26 cryptographers, 28 engineers, 273 Wrens with ten Colossi, three Robinsons, three Tunnies, plus twenty small electronic and electrical machines.

== See also ==
- Fish
- Allen Coombs
- Tommy Flowers
- Jack Good
- Peter Hilton
- Donald Michie
- Bill Tutte

== Sources ==
- Ashcroft, M. (ca. 1945), "Newmanry Addresses (incomplete)" The Papers of Max Newman, Box 3/2/1, St John's College Library, Cambridge UK
- Copeland, B. Jack, ed. (2006), Colossus: The Secrets of Bletchley Park's Codebreaking Computers, Oxford: Oxford University Press, ISBN 978-0-19-284055-4
- Gannon, Paul (2006). Colossus: Bletchley Park's Greatest Secret. London: Atlantic Books. ISBN 1-84354-330-3.
- Good, Jack; Michie, Donald; Timms, Geoffrey (1945), General Report on Tunny: With Emphasis on Statistical Methods, UK Public Record Office HW 25/4 and HW 25/5, archived from the original on 17 September 2010 That version is a facsimile copy, but there is a transcript of much of this document in '.pdf' format at: Sale, Tony (2001), Part of the "General Report on Tunny", the Newmanry History, formatted by Tony Sale (PDF), and a web transcript of Part 1 at: Ellsbury, Graham, General Report on Tunny With Emphasis on Statistical Methods
- Kenyon, David (2019), Bletchley Park and D-Day: The Untold Story of How the Battle for Normandy Was Won, Yale University Press, ISBN 978-0-300-24357-4
