= Ted Cooke-Yarborough =

English designer

- Born: Edmund Harry Cooke-Yarborough; 25 December 1918; Campsall, Yorkshire, England
- Died: 10 January 2013 (aged 94)
- Citizenship: United Kingdom
- Known for: Harwell Dekatron Computer, Harwell CADET Computer, Radar
- Scientific career
- Fields: Physics, Electronics, Computing
- Workplaces: Telecommunications Research Establishment, Atomic Energy Research Establishment

Edmund Harry Cooke-Yarborough (25 December 1918 – 10 January 2013) was the lead designer of the Harwell Dekatron, one of the world's early electronic computers and also a pioneer of radar.

== Life ==
Ted Cooke-Yarborough was born at Campsall in the Yorkshire West Riding, northern England, the only child of barrister George Eustace Cooke-Yarborough (1876–1938), JP, of Campsmount, Yorkshire, and his wife Daphne Isabel (died 1984), daughter of Henry Cordy Wrinch. The Cooke-Yarborough family were a branch of the family of Cooke baronets, of Wheatley Hall, Yorkshire. Cooke-Yarborough was educated at Canford School in Dorset, southern England, where he built his first Wireless equipment, and studied Physics at Christ Church, Oxford, where he was president of the University Physics Society.

During World War II, he worked as part of the secret Air Ministry RDF radar project, initially in Dundee and then at Swanage within the Telecommunications Research Establishment (TRE). He led a team that produced an automatic airborne radar system, used to warn aircrews of aircraft approaching from behind. He continued his work in radar at Malvern and then on guided weapons in the United States. After WWII, he was sent on a Combined Intelligence mission to interview German scientists concerning their development work on radar and guided weapons and.

In 1946, Cooke-Yarborough joined UK Atomic Energy programme to work on nuclear instrumentation. Soon after his transfer to the Atomic Energy Research Establishment in Harwell (AERE Harwell) in 1948, he supervised the production of the Harwell Dekatron Computer, working with fellow designers Dick Barnes and Gurney Thomas. All three visited the EDSAC computer in Cambridge during the design stage. In 1951, Cooke-Yarborough attended the first Bell Labs symposium on the transistor. Afterwards he developed the Harwell CADET computer, which was one of the first digital computers to use transistors.

in 1957, Cooke-Yarborough was appointed as head of the Electronics Division at AERE Harwell, and published "An Introduction to Transistor Circuits". In 1980, Cooke-Yarborough was elected Fellow of the Fellowship of Engineering (later to become the Royal Academy of Engineering) and was appointed chief research scientist at AERE until he retired in 1982. On 20 November 2012, Cooke-Yarborough attended the reboot of the Harwell Dekatron Computer at the National Museum of Computing, the last time that he appeared in public.

In 1953, Cooke-Yarborough married Anthea Katherine (1928–2007), daughter of John Alexander Dixon, of Whirlow, Hook Heath, Woking, Surrey. They had a son and daughter, and also grandchildren.

== Selected publications ==
- Cooke-Yarborough, E. H. (1957). Introduction to Transistor Circuits. Edinburgh: Oliver and Boyd. p. 139.
- Cooke-Yarborough, E. H. (June 1998). "Some early transistor applications in the UK". Engineering Science & Education Journal. 7 (3). IEE: 100–106. doi:10.1049/esej:19980301 (inactive 12 July 2025). ISSN 0963-7346. Archived from the original on 5 July 2020. (subscription required)
