= Yeadon =

Yeadon may refer to:

== Places ==
- Yeadon, West Yorkshire, England, a small town near Leeds
  - Yeadon Airport, a locally used name for Leeds Bradford Airport
- Yeadon, Pennsylvania, United States
- Yeadon station (disambiguation), stations of the name

== People ==
- Daniel Yeadon, British-born Australian cellist and viola da gambist
- Harry Yeadon (1922–2015), British civil engineer
- James Yeadon (1861–1914), English cricketer
- Jim Yeadon (born 1949), American politician from Wisconsin
- John Yeadon (born 1948), British artist
- Kim Yeadon (born 1956), Australian politician
- Michael Yeadon, British pharmacologist and conspiracy theorist
- Peter Yeadon (born 1965), American architect and designer
- Willie Yeadon (1907–1997), English railway historian
