= Rachel Burnett =

English solicitor

Rachel Burnett is a retired solicitor who was an expert on English information technology law.

After obtaining a degree in sociology at the University of Exeter, she worked in a range of IT roles including systems analysis and development, and project management. During this time she studied law via distance learning and in 1985 she became a partner in an early IT legal practice.

After partnerships in leading IT/IP law firms and her own niche commercial IT law firm for seven years, she headed up the specialist IT/IP team at Paris Smith LLP in Southampton, Hampshire.

She was an associate lecturer with the Law Programme at the Open University for ten years.

She was awarded an Honorary degree of Doctor of Technology by Southampton Solent University.

== Books and other publications ==
She is author of a book, Outsourcing IT - The Legal Aspects, now in its 2nd edition published by Gower and co-authored 3 editions of Drafting and Negotiating Computer Contracts with Paul Klinger. She was editor of the IT Law Guides Series published for the Institute of Chartered Accountants of England & Wales on a variety of legal topics, and has written a number of other books on IT law.

Burnett writes a blog for the London Branch of the International Wine and Food Society, of which she is a committee member.

== Professional Activities ==
Burnett is a Trustee of The National Museum of Computing. She was Chair of the Computer Conservation Society from 2011 to 2016 and is now its committee secretary. In 2007 to 2008, Burnett served as president of the British Computer Society (BCS). She is a former Chair of the Association of Women Solicitors.
