= Josephine Langley =

English ventriloquist

- Born: Annie Howarth
- Other names: Madame Langley, Lady Ventriloquist
- Occupation: Ventriloquist
- Years active: c. 1910s
- Relatives: John Yeadon (grandson)

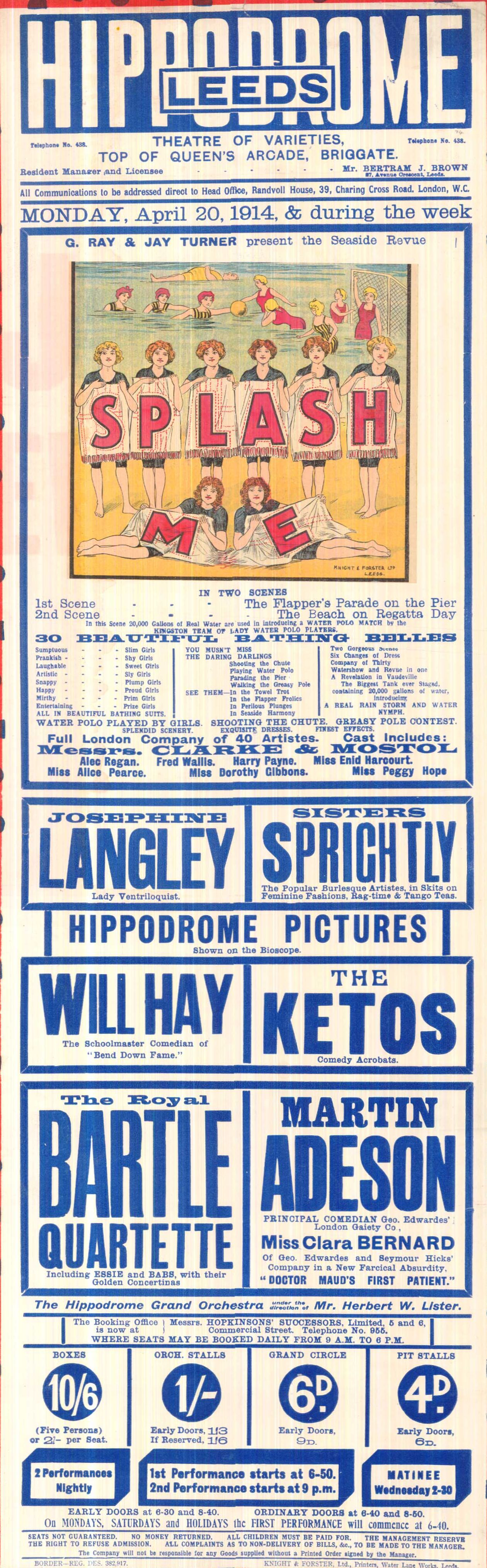
Leeds Hippodrome's playbill for the week beginning Monday, 20 April 1914, with Langley second on the bill, above Will Hay

Josephine Langley, or Madame Langley, Lady Ventriloquist, was the stage name of Annie Howarth, an English ventriloquist, who performed in music halls. She learned the skill of ventriloquy from her brother James Langley, and first performed at Sunday School concerts in her home town of Burnley, at the age of twelve. She was subsequently managed by her husband, Edward Howarth (known as "Ned").

In 1929 the couple emigrated to the United States, with their young son. They subsequently returned to England.

Her grandson is the artist, John Yeadon, who features her ventriloquist dummies in his work.
