= John Yeadon =

British artist (born 1948)

- Born: John David Yeadon; 1948 (age 76–77)
- Occupations: Painter; Art educator
- Website: johnyeadon.com/blog/

John David Yeadon (born 1948) is a British artist and art educator. A practicing artist for over 50 years, he explored issues of politics, sexuality, food, national identity, the grotesque and carnival. In the 1980s, his work was provocative with issues relating to male sexuality. An eclectic artist, essentially a painter and printmaker, his work has included text, digital images, and photography, and he has worked on banner making, theatre design and has collaborated with video artists.

Yeadon's grandmother was the ventriloquist Annie Howarth, who worked under the stage name Josephine Langley. Recurring themes in his paintings since 2010 include his mother and grandmother's ventriloquist dummies.

He has exhibited over 30 one-person shows throughout Britain and abroad, including in Portugal and Germany, and Britain, including the Royal Festival Hall, Centre for Contemporary Art, Glasgow and Ikon, Birmingham. His group shows included the British Art Show (1985/6) and exhibitions in Germany, Holland, Portugal and Hong Kong.

He set up the Coventry-Dresden Arts Exchange in 2012.

== Dirty Tricks ==
Yeadon's 1984 exhibition Dirty Tricks at the Herbert Art Gallery and Museum in Coventry was at the high point of AIDS paranoia and gay 'blame', Yeadon's forthright, radical, critical, 'in your face' paintings challenged preconceptions on sexuality and society. These paradoxes disturbed and offended some Tory councillors.

The Coventry Evening Telegraph declared that it was 'Smut Not Art' in a homophobic editorial rant. However, the exhibition increased the attendance at the Herbert by 40%. Later that year, works from this exhibition were exhibited at the Pentonville Gallery in London and the British Art Show of 1985. The Arts Council of Great Britain bought a version of 'The Last Chilean Supper', one of the 'lavatory wall smut' paintings derided in the Coventry Evening Telegraph.

== Fat ==
Again, Yeadon was criticised by the local media for including tiny images of obese people culled from the Internet in his exhibition on food; these pictures were removed from the exhibition. Fat: The mortality of the eater and the eaten at the Bath Place Community Venture in Leamington Spa in 2010.

== Harwell computer ==
Yeadon's 9×7ft painting of the Harwell Dekatron computer, later known as the Wolverhampton Instrument for Teaching Computing from Harwell (WITCH), Portrait of a Dead WITCH, made in 1983, was exhibited at the 1984 Leicestershire Schools and Colleges show and subsequently purchased by Newbridge High School, Coalville, Leicestershire. Within two years of that school becoming a private academy school, the painting was sold at auction in 2015 to an undisclosed private buyer.

A campaign by The National Museum of Computing (TNMC) resulted in the rediscovery of the painting, by then displayed at the Jam Street Cafe Bar in Whalley Range, Manchester. Bar owner Kaldip Bhamber, who has a fine arts degree, was unaware of the painting's provenance when she purchased it. Yeadon has visited the painting at its new location.

The painting was a subversive irony on 'computer art'; that is, a painting of a computer posing as 'computer art'. After 35 years, Yeadon painted Portrait of a Live WITCH, a second version of the work, for the 5th anniversary of the restoration of computer at the TNMC. In February 2018, the two paintings were brought together for an exhibition on Yeadon's 70th birthday at TNMC.

== Teaching ==
Yeadon has been a visiting lecturer at Slade School of Fine Art and the Royal College of Art, at Goldsmiths College, Chelsea College of Art, Wimbledon School of Art, Glasgow School of Art and, whilst as a full-time Lecturer from 1973 to 2002, at Coventry University, where he eventually led the MA Fine Art course.

== Works ==
- The Last Chilean Supper – Arts Council Collection, Southbank Centre
- Modern Art, Disco Drawing – Herbert Art Gallery & Museum
