= Yeadon station =

Yeadon station may refer to:

- Yeadon railway station (England), a former train station in Yeadon, West Yorkshire, England
- Yeadon station (SEPTA Metro), a SEPTA trolley station in Philadelphia, Pennsylvania
- Fernwood–Yeadon station, a SEPTA Regional Rail station in Fernwood, Pennsylvania

== See also ==
- Yeadon (disambiguation)
