= Computer Conservation Society =

British organisation

- Founded: 1989
- Type: Professional Organisation
- Purpose: History of Computing in the UK
- Origins: The British Computer Society, Science Museum, MOSI
- Region served: UK and worldwide
- Method: Research, Education, Restorations and Reconstructions
- Members: 1,000+
- Website: computerconservationsociety.org

The Computer Conservation Society (CCS) is a British organisation, founded in 1989. It is under the joint umbrella of the British Computer Society (BCS), the London Science Museum and the Manchester Museum of Science and Industry.

== Overview ==
The CCS is interested in the history of computing in general and the conservation and preservation of early British historical computers in particular.

The society runs a series of monthly public lectures between September and May each year in both London and Manchester. The events are detailed on the society's website.

The CCS publishes a quarterly journal, Resurrection.

The society celebrated its 25th anniversary in 2014.

Dr Doron Swade, formerly the curator of the computing collection at the London Science Museum, was a founding committee member and As of 2021 is the current chair of the society. David Morriss, Rachel Burnett, and Roger Johnson are previous chairs, also all previous presidents of the BCS.

== Projects ==
The society organises a number of projects to reconstruct and maintain early computers and to conserve early software. For example:

Restorations

- Elliott 401
- Elliott 803
- Elliott 903 and 905
- DEC Systems
- Ferranti Pegasus
- ICT 1301 Project
- Harwell Dekatron Computer
- Differential analyser
- HEC 1

Reconstructions

- Colossus Rebuild
- Manchester Baby
- Bombe Rebuild
- EDSAC Replica Project
- Babbage's Analytical Engine

Other projects

- Software preservation
- "Our Computer Heritage" website
- Tony Sale Award for computer conservation and restoration

== Locations ==
London Science Museum:

- Ferranti Pegasus (Not currently being displayed working)

Museum of Science and Industry, Manchester:

- Manchester Baby
- Hartree Differential Analyser

The National Museum of Computing:

- Colossus
- Harwell Dekatron or WITCH
- ICL 2966
- Elliott 803
- Elliott 903
- EDSAC Replica

Bletchley Park Trust:

- Bombe

Currently not on public display:

- ICT 1301 (Currently in storage at The National Museum of Computing)
- Elliott 401
- Elliott 905 (Currently in storage at The National Museum of Computing)
