= Harwell computer =

Early British computer

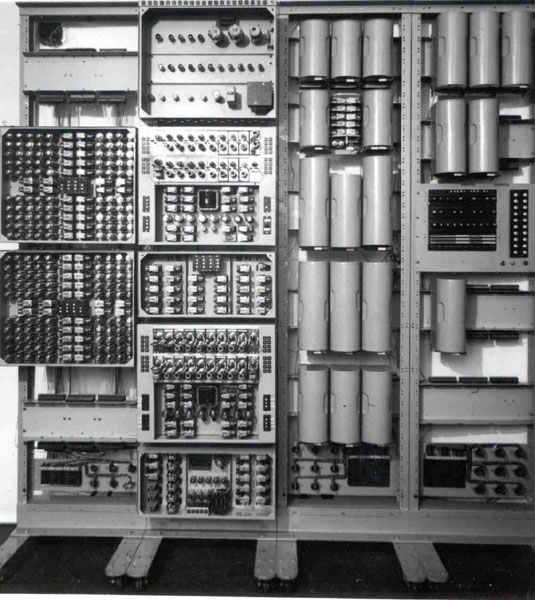
- The Harwell Dekatron computer
- Also known as: Wolverhampton Instrument for Teaching Computing from Harwell (WITCH)
- Developer: Atomic Energy Research Establishment in Harwell, Berkshire
- Released: May 1952; 74 years ago
- Discontinued: 1973
- CPU: Relays for sequence control and valve-based (vacuum tube) electronics for calculations
- Memory: 20 (later 40) eight-digit dekatron registers
- Storage: Paper tape
- Display: Either a Creed teleprinter or a paper tape punch
- Power: 1.5 kW
- Weight: 2.5 tonnes

The Harwell computer, or Harwell Dekatron computer, later known as the Wolverhampton Instrument for Teaching Computing from Harwell (WITCH), is an early British computer of the 1950s based on valves and relays. From 2009 to 2012, it was restored at the National Museum of Computing. In 2013, for the second time, the Guinness Book of World Records recognised it as the world's oldest working digital computer, following its restoration. It previously held the title for several years until it was decommissioned in 1973. The museum uses the computer's visual, dekatron-based memory to teach schoolchildren about computers.

== Construction and use at Harwell ==
The computer, which weighs 2.5 metric tons (2.8 short tons), was built and used at the Atomic Energy Research Establishment in Harwell, then in Berkshire (now Oxfordshire). Construction started in 1949, and the machine became operational in April 1951. It was handed over to the computing group in May 1952 and remained in use until 1957.

It used 828 dekatrons for volatile memory, similar to RAM in a modern computer, and paper tape for input and program storage. A total of 480 relays were used for sequence control and 199 valves (electronic vacuum tube) for calculations. The computer stands 2 meters high, 6 meters wide, and 1 meter deep with a power consumption of 1.5 kW. Output was to either a Creed teleprinter or to a paper tape punch. The machine was decimal and initially had 20 eight-digit dekatron registers for internal storage, which was increased to 40 which appeared to be enough for nearly all calculations. It was assembled from components more commonly found in a British telephone exchange. The man who led the effort to rebuild the machine (see below) put it in perspective to the BBC: "All together, the machine can store 90 numbers. The closest analogy is a man with a pocket calculator," Delwyn Holroyd, who led the restoration effort, tells the BBC in a video about the restoration. Although it could on occasions act as a true stored-program computer, that was not its normal mode of operation. It had a multiplication time of between 5 and 10 seconds, very slow for an electronic computer.

As Ted Cooke-Yarborough wrote of his design in 1953 "a slow computer can only justify its existence if it is capable of running for long periods unattended and the time spent performing useful computations is a large proportion of the total time available". The design was noted for its reliability because in the period from May 1952 until February 1953 it averaged 80 hours per week running time. Dr Jack Howlett, Director of the Computer Laboratory at AERE 1948–61, said it "could be left unattended for long periods; I think the record was over one Christmas-New Year holiday when it was all by itself, with miles of input data on punched tape to keep it happy, for at least ten days and was still ticking away when we came back." It was the machine's untiring durability, rather than its speed, that was its main feature. Human mathematicians (a job role called a "hand-computer") could make calculations at a similar speed, but not continuously for the same lengths of time. Dr Howlett commented:

One day EB ‘Bart’ Fossey, an excellent hand-computer (still with what used to be called the Atlas Computer Laboratory), settled down beside the machine with his desk machine and attempted a race. He kept level for about half an hour working flat out, but had to retire, exhausted; the machine just ploughed on.

== Subsequent use, renaming as the WITCH and disuse ==
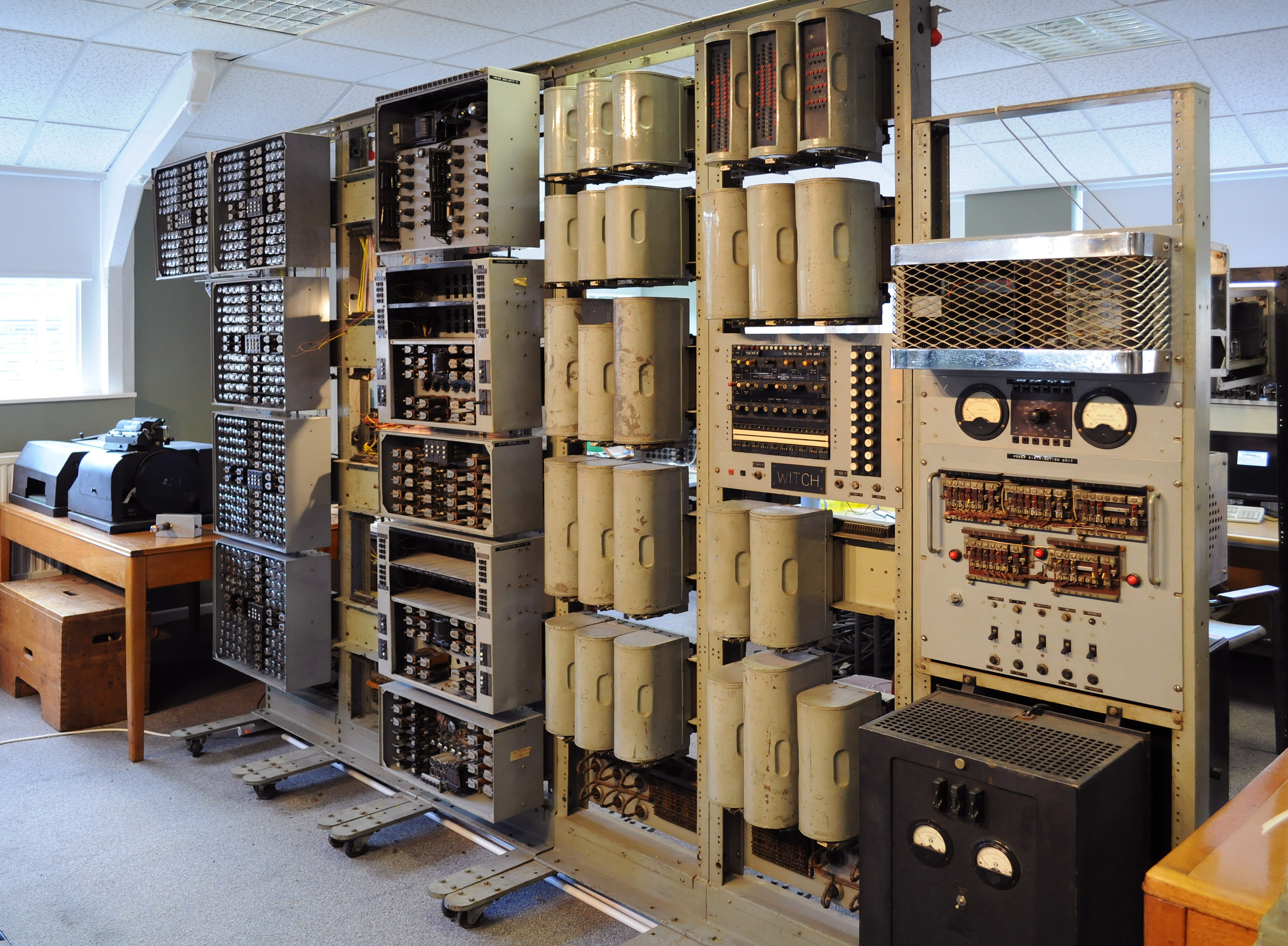
The Harwell Dekatron computer under restoration at the British National Museum of Computing, Bletchley Park, March 2010

In 1957, at the end of its life at Harwell, the Oxford Mathematical Institute ran a competition to award it to the college that could produce the best case for its future use. The competition was the idea of John Hammersley, who had worked at AERE previously. The competition was won by the Wolverhampton and Staffordshire Technical College (which later became Wolverhampton University) where it was used to teach computing until 1973. The computer was renamed as the WITCH, the Wolverhampton Instrument for Teaching Computing from Harwell.

The WITCH was donated to the Museum of Science and Industry, Birmingham in 1973. After the museum closed in 1997, the computer was disassembled and stored at the Birmingham Museum Collection Centre.

== Restoration ==
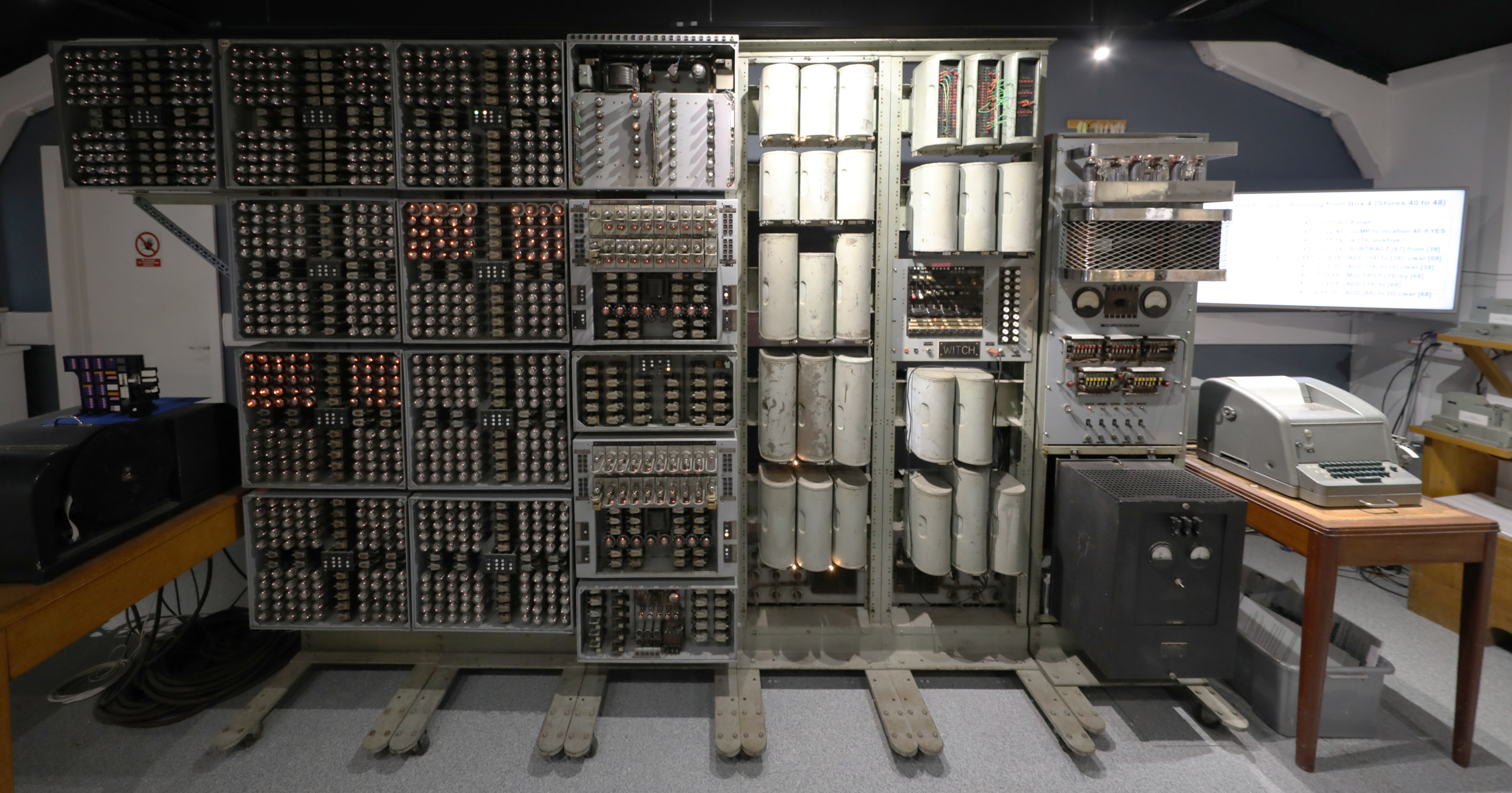
The complete computer viewed from the front

From September 2009, the machine was loaned to The National Museum of Computing at Bletchley Park, where it began to be restored to working order as a Computer Conservation Society project. The museum, a registered charity, invited members of the public and industry to sponsor the restoration of the Harwell computer by purchasing one of 25 shares at £4,500 each. In 2012, the restoration was completed successfully.

== Painting ==
A 9 by 7 feet (2.7 m × 2.1 m) painting of the machine, Portrait of a Dead WITCH was made by the artist John Yeadon in 1983. After being exhibited at the 1984 Leicestershire Schools and Colleges show and subsequently purchased by Newbridge High School, Coalville, Leicestershire. Within two years of that school becoming a private academy school, the painting was sold at auction in 2015 to an undisclosed private buyer. It was discovered on the wall of the Jam Street Cafe Bar in Manchester. Kaldip Bhamber, who has a fine arts degree, was unaware of the painting provenance when she purchased it. John Yeadon has visited the painting at its new location.

== See also ==
- List of vacuum-tube computers
- Electromechanical computer
