= The National Museum of Computing =

Museum in Milton Keynes, United Kingdom

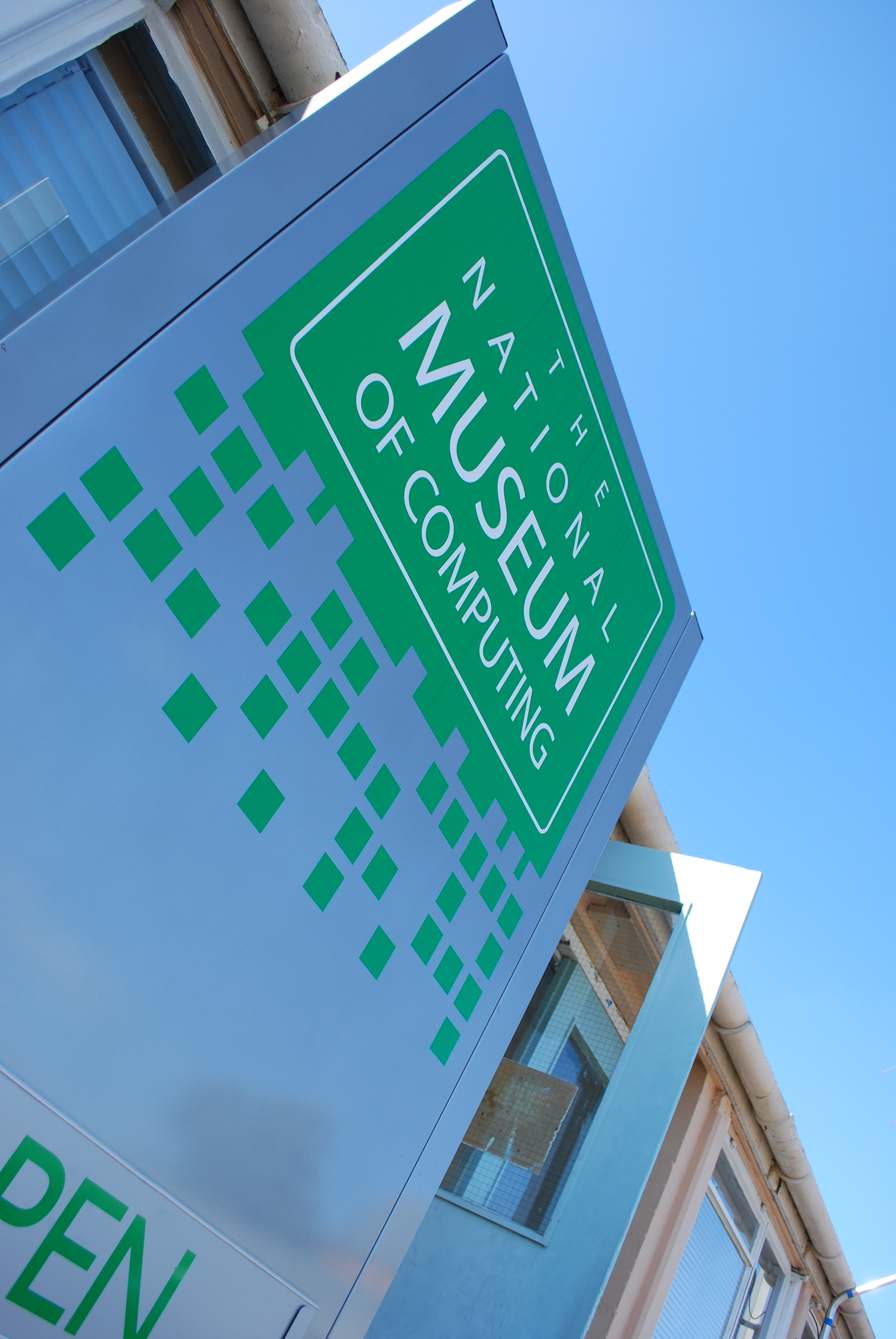
- Established: 2007
- Location: Bletchley Park, Buckinghamshire, England
- Coordinates: 51.9985°N 0.7435°W
- Accreditation: Nationally-styled museum by Arts Council England
- Public transit access: Bletchley Train Station
- Website: tnmoc.org

The National Museum of Computing is a UK-based museum that is dedicated to collecting and restoring historic computer systems, and is home to the world's largest collection of working historic computers. The museum is located on Bletchley Park in Milton Keynes, Buckinghamshire. It opened in 2007 in Block H – the first purpose-built computer centre in the world, having housed six of the ten Colossus computers that were in use at the end of World War II.

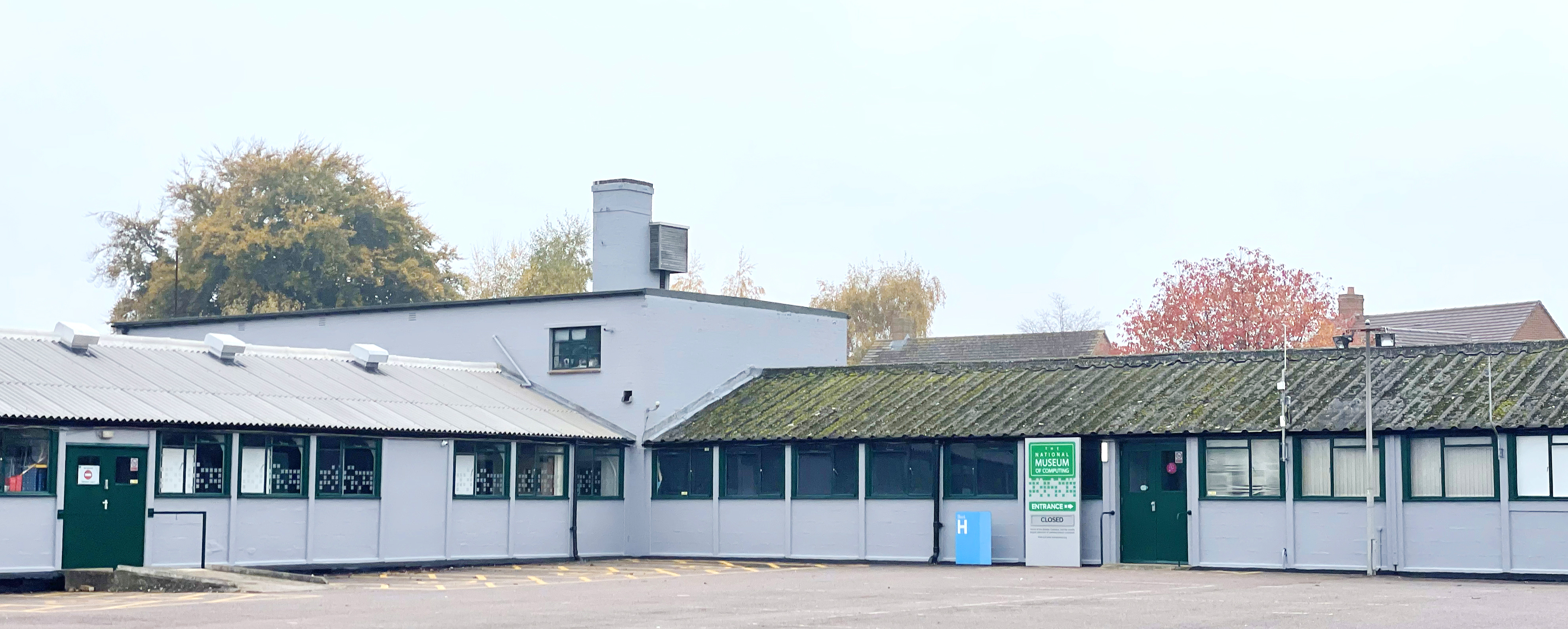
Block H at Bletchley Park, home of The National Museum of Computing

As well as first-generation computers including the original Harwell Dekatron computer—the world's oldest working digital computer— and mainframes of the 1950s, 60s and 70s, the Museum houses an extensive collection of personal computers and a classroom full of BBC Micros. It is available for corporate, group, school, and individual visitors.

Although located on the Bletchley Park campus, The National Museum of Computing is an entirely separate registered charity with its own admission fee. It receives no public funding and relies on ticket sales and the generosity of donors and supporters. The museum has its own cafe and gift shop. In 2024 it was awarded full accreditation as a Nationally-styled museum by Arts Council England.

== Origins ==
The Bletchley Park estate was threatened with demolition and redevelopment in the late 1980s and early 1990s. It was saved in 1993 thanks to the efforts of the Bletchley Park Trust (BPT), which had been established in the previous year. One leading member – and secretary to the Trust – was a scientist with electronics and computer engineering skills named Tony Sale (1931–2011). He had worked for MI5 and later at the Science Museum alongside Doron Swade on a series of projects to restore some of the Science Museum's computer holdings to working order. Sale became the first curator of the Bletchley Park Museum, which in its early days was supplemented by more than a score of collections varying from WWII memorabilia to model railways. One of these centred around the history of computing and contained many historic computers, several of which were maintained in working order by enthusiastic volunteers, many of whom were members of the Computer Conservation Society.

In 1993, Tony Sale and a group of volunteers started to rebuild a Colossus (a 'rebuild' as it contains parts from an original) in Block H. By June 1996 they had a prototype machine working, which was formally switched on by the Duke of Kent in the presence of Tommy Flowers who built the wartime Colossi. When in 2004 Block H came under threat of demolition, Sale and colleagues were able to protect it by obtaining Grade II listed building status for it. This led to the detachment of the computing collection from the Bletchley Park Trust museum, and the establishment in 2005 of the Codes and Ciphers Heritage Trust, which became the National Museum of Computing in 2007. Between 1994 and 2007 a group of volunteers led by John Harper built a working replica of a Turing-Welchman Bombe (used to help decipher Enigma–coded messages) in the BPT museum. This was relocated to Block H in 2018.

== Exhibits ==
The exhibits on display in the museum represent only a fraction of the collection, but are chosen to tell the story of computing developments in Britain. There are a number of galleries which can be visited in a broadly chronological sequence, starting with the working replicas of WWII machines that were developed and used by Bletchley Park codebreakers.

=== Bombe Gallery ===
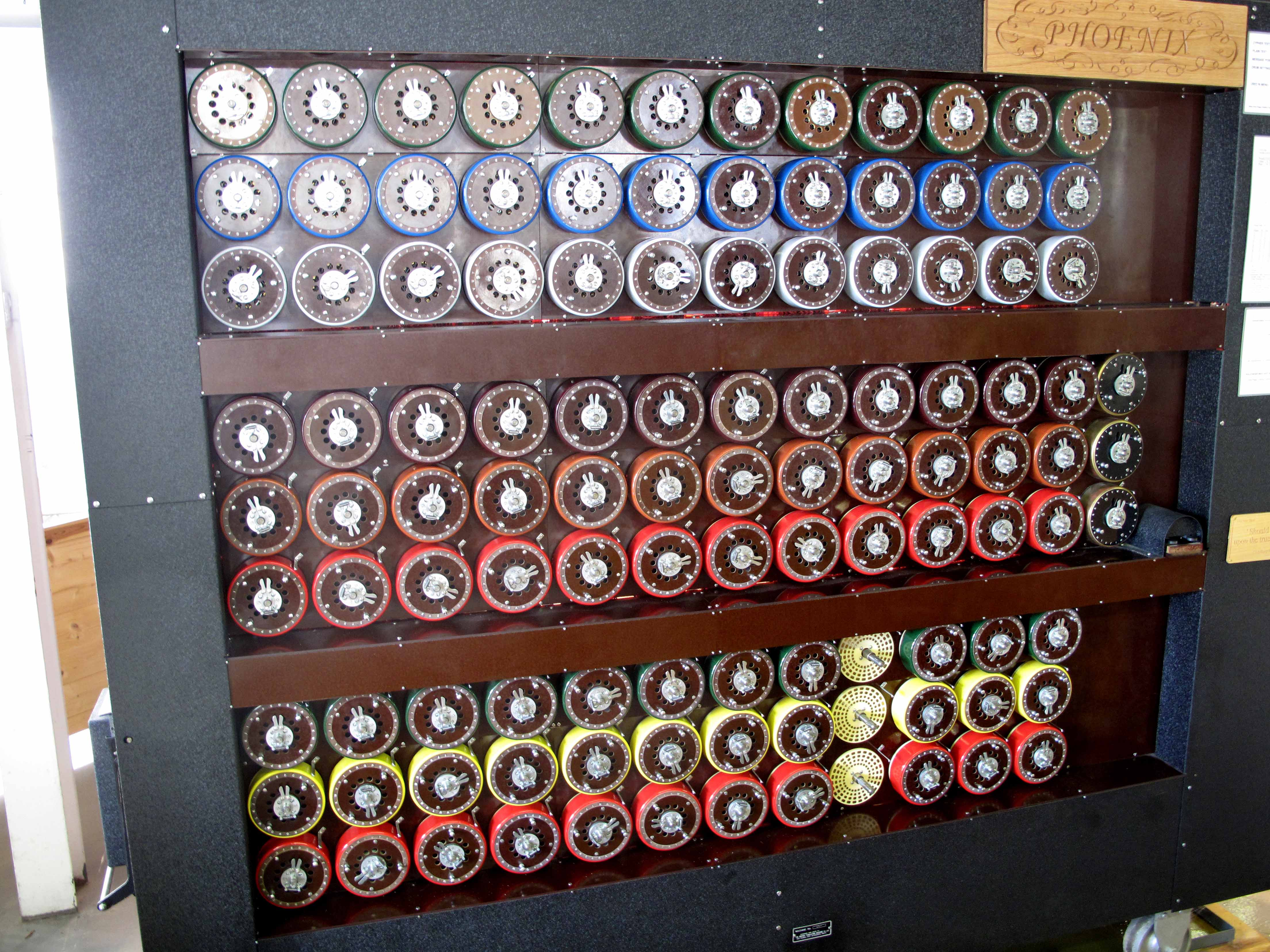
Rebuilt Bombe

This gallery tells the story of Cryptanalysis of the Enigma. Enigma machines were used by the Germans before and during WWII for sending secret messages. Alan Turing further developed, and Gordon Welchman enhanced, an idea implemented by Polish codebreakers, of a machine to assist in decrypting Enigma messages. This gallery houses a fully working replica of a Bombe machine, a working replica Enigma and various related artefacts.

The replica Bombe was built by a team led by John Harper following the release in 1995 to the Bletchley Park Trust of some 2,000 BTM documents and drawings relating to the Bombes that they had built during the war. The replica is owned and managed by the Turing-Welchman Bombe Rebuild Trust, which provides and trains the volunteers who run and demonstrate the machine to visitors on a regular basis.

=== Tunny and Colossus Galleries ===
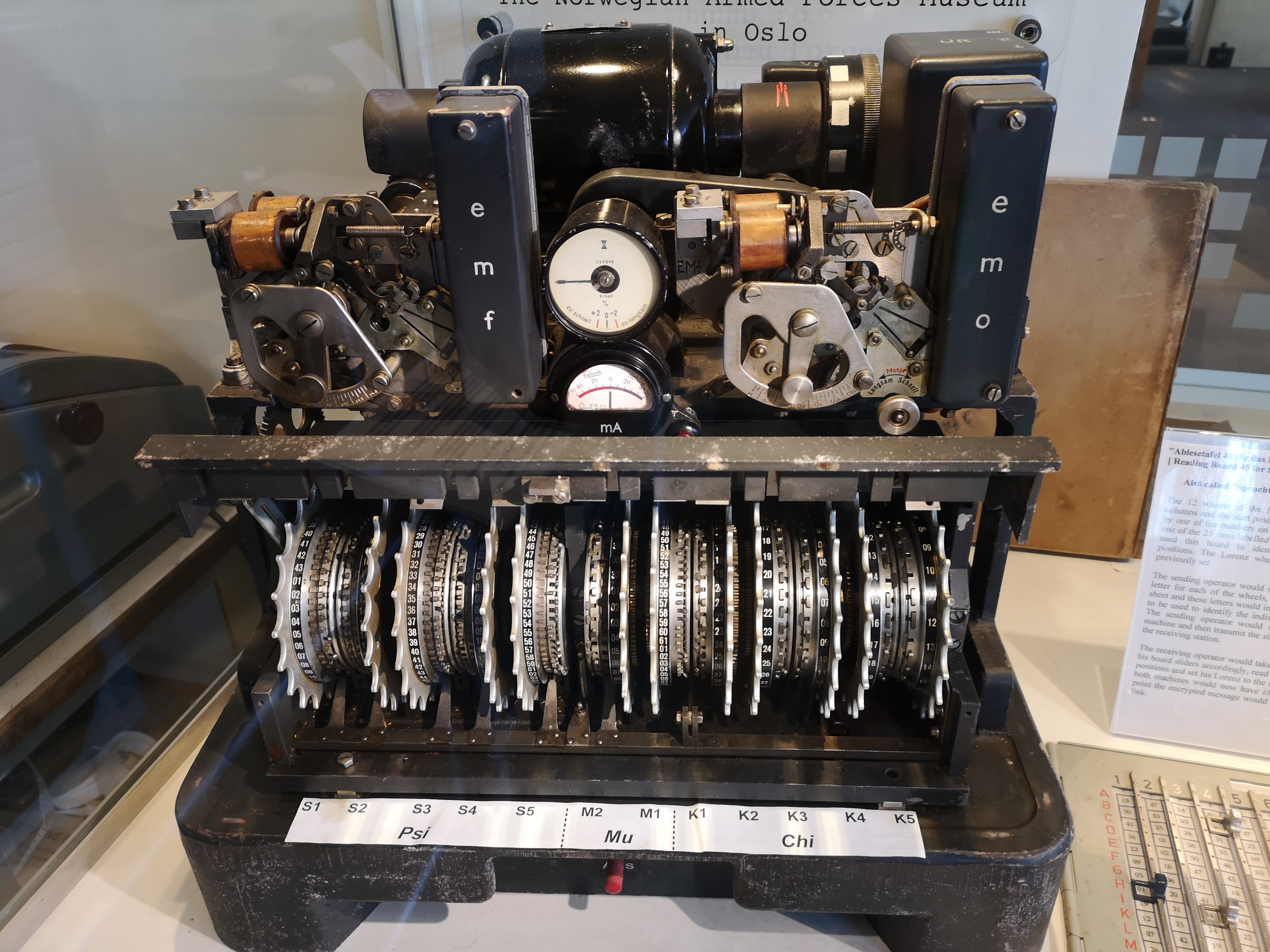
Lorenz SZ42 cipher machine

Separate from the Enigma story is the diagnosing and deciphering of messages produced by the more secure 12-rotor Lorenz SZ teleprinter cipher attachments, which is told in these two galleries. The Tunny gallery exhibits one of the few Lorenz SZ42 machines still in existence — something that nobody on the Allied side saw until after Nazi Field Marshal Albert Kesselring surrendered in May 1945, shortly before VE day.

'Tunny' was the name given to the messages, to the unseen cipher machine and to the British-built emulator of it. The gallery contains a reproduction of part of the original Lorenz listening station at Knockholt in Kent, with its multiple RCA AR-88 radio receivers, pen recorders (undulators) and the sort of paper tape and teleprinter equipment that was used to record the messages and transmit them to Bletchley Park. Also on display is a working replica of a British Tunny machine that exactly emulated the Lorenz machine and a working replica of the Heath Robinson machine, the forerunner of Colossus.

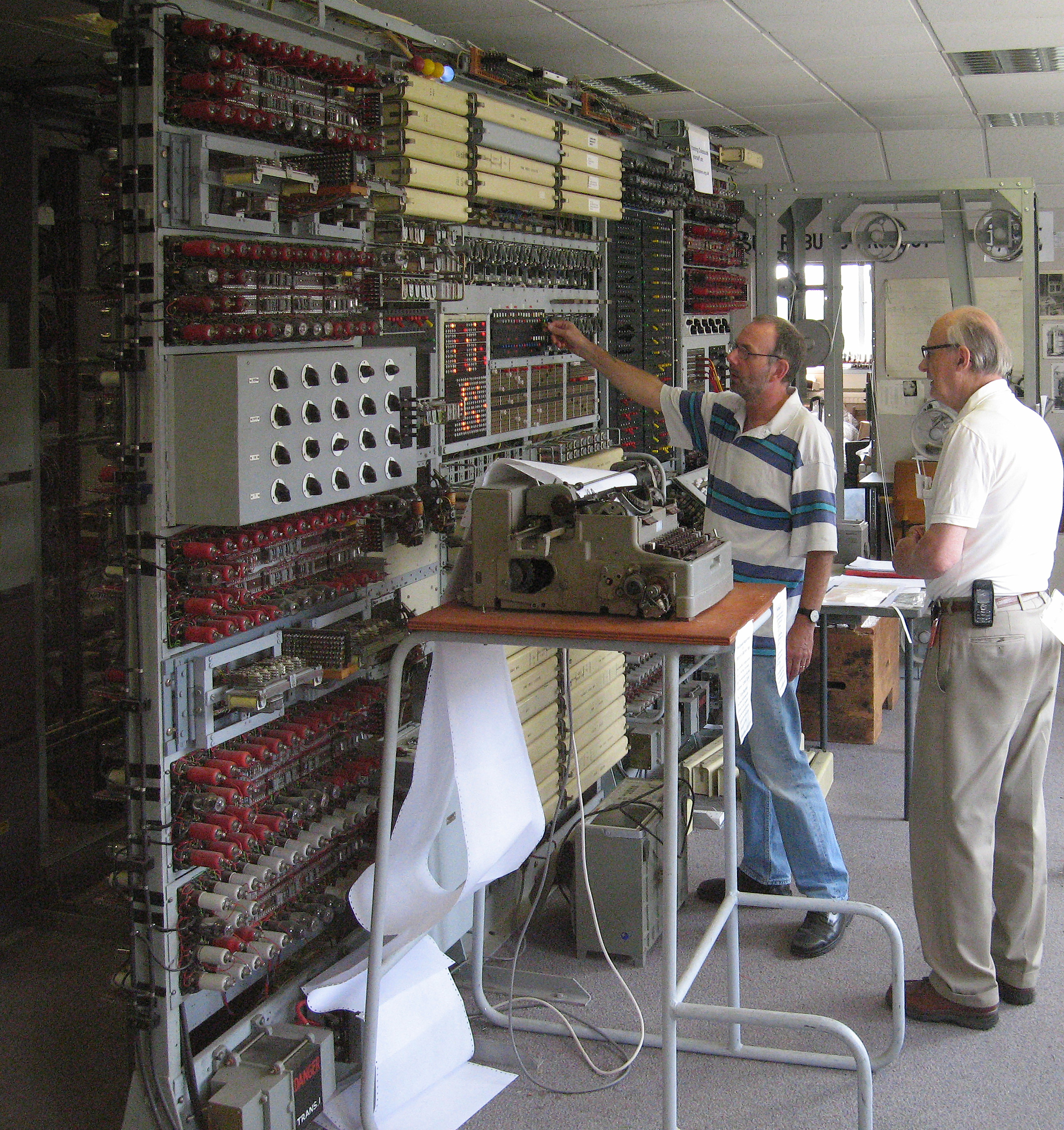
Tony Sale (right) using the Colossus rebuild

The Colossus gallery houses the fully working rebuild of a Colossus Mark 2. During his work to save Bletchley Park, Tony Sale recognised the pioneering nature of the ten Colossus machines that had been designed and built during WWII to assist in breaking messages enciphered by the Lorenz machines. He and his team spent 14 years from 1993 in building this machine.

As its name implies, Colossus was a large machine which weighed five tonnes. It was designed and built for the single purpose of assisting with deciphering messages enciphered with the 'Tunny' machines. At the heart of the machine is a set of five counters that, for each transit of the looped paper tape containing the message, count the number of times that defined Boolean expressions deliver a specified value. These Boolean expressions were programmed by operating a panel of about 190 switches. The looped message tape would be run continuously, being read at 5,000 characters per second. A cryptanalyst would specify different Boolean expressions for evaluation according to the results produced. With its 2,420 valves (vacuum tubes) and its programmability, the machine on display is a recreation of the world’s first large-scale, electronic programmable digital computer, albeit a special-purpose machine.

There are a number of related artefacts in this gallery.

=== First Generation Gallery ===
This gallery continues the story of valve or tube-based computers and exhibits three large machines and many other related items. The three unique large machines are:

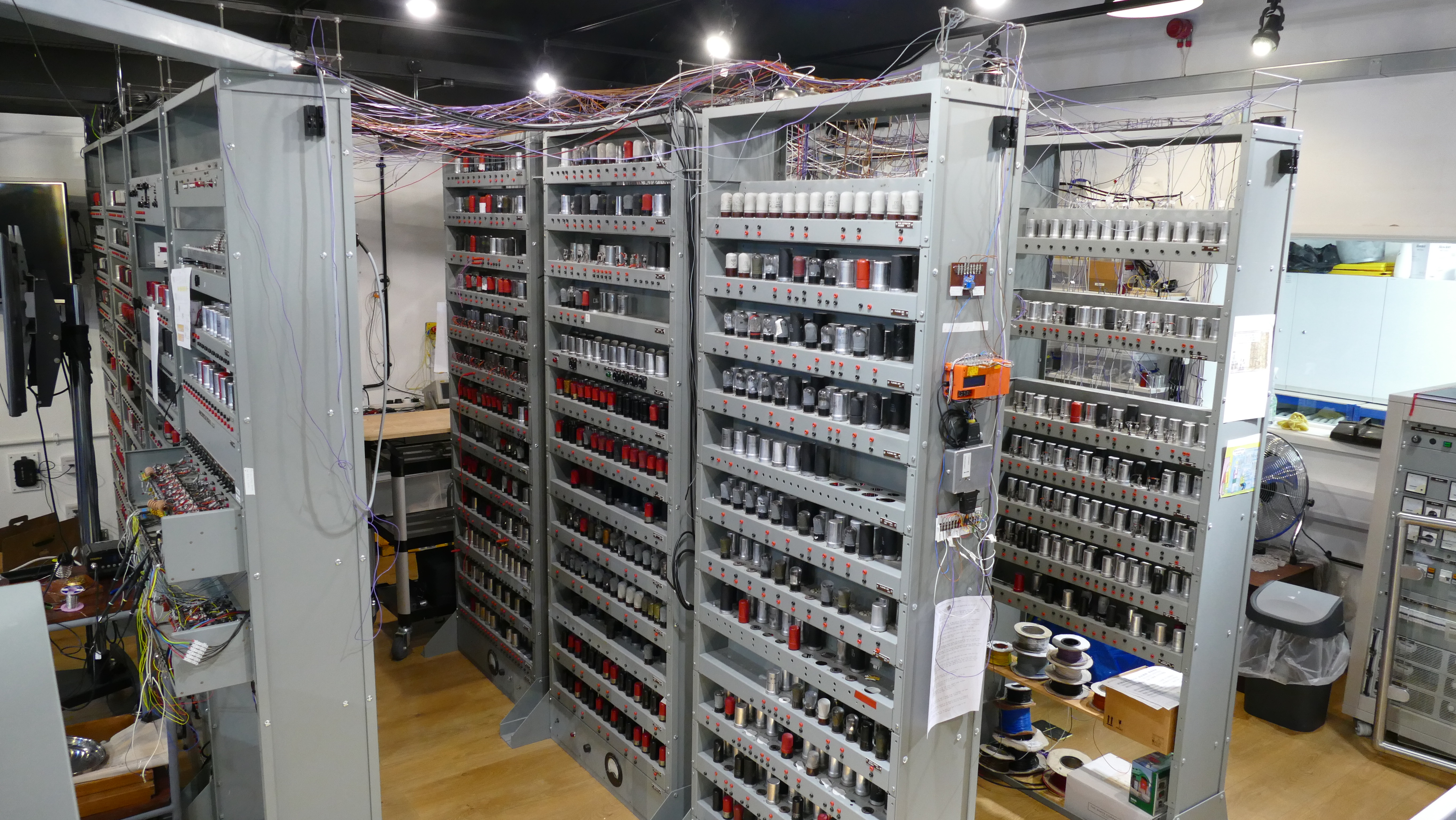
EDSAC replica under construction, October 2024

- EDSAC – a replica nearing completion. The machine is owned and managed by the EDSAC Replica Project, which provides and trains the volunteers who are building it and, eventually, will run and demonstrate it.

The original EDSAC (Electronic Delay Storage Automatic Calculator) was constructed by the Cambridge University Mathematical Laboratory under Sir Maurice Wilkes. Wilkes had read John von Neumann's seminal paper First Draft of a Report on the EDVAC and attended the Moore School Lectures in Summer 1946. Starting in 1947, he designed and built the machine to serve a user community from many different departments of the university. The EDSAC ran its first programs on 6 May 1949 and is therefore claimed to be the first practical general-purpose stored-program electronic computer.

The vast increase in computing power that EDSAC and its successor EDSAC 2 supplied, contributed to the winning of three Nobel Prizes – John Kendrew and Max Perutz (Chemistry, 1962) for the discovery of the structure of myoglobin, Andrew Huxley (Medicine, 1963) for quantitative analysis of excitation and conduction in nerves and Martin Ryle (Physics, 1974) for the development of aperture synthesis in radio astronomy. All acknowledged EDSAC in their Nobel Prize speeches.

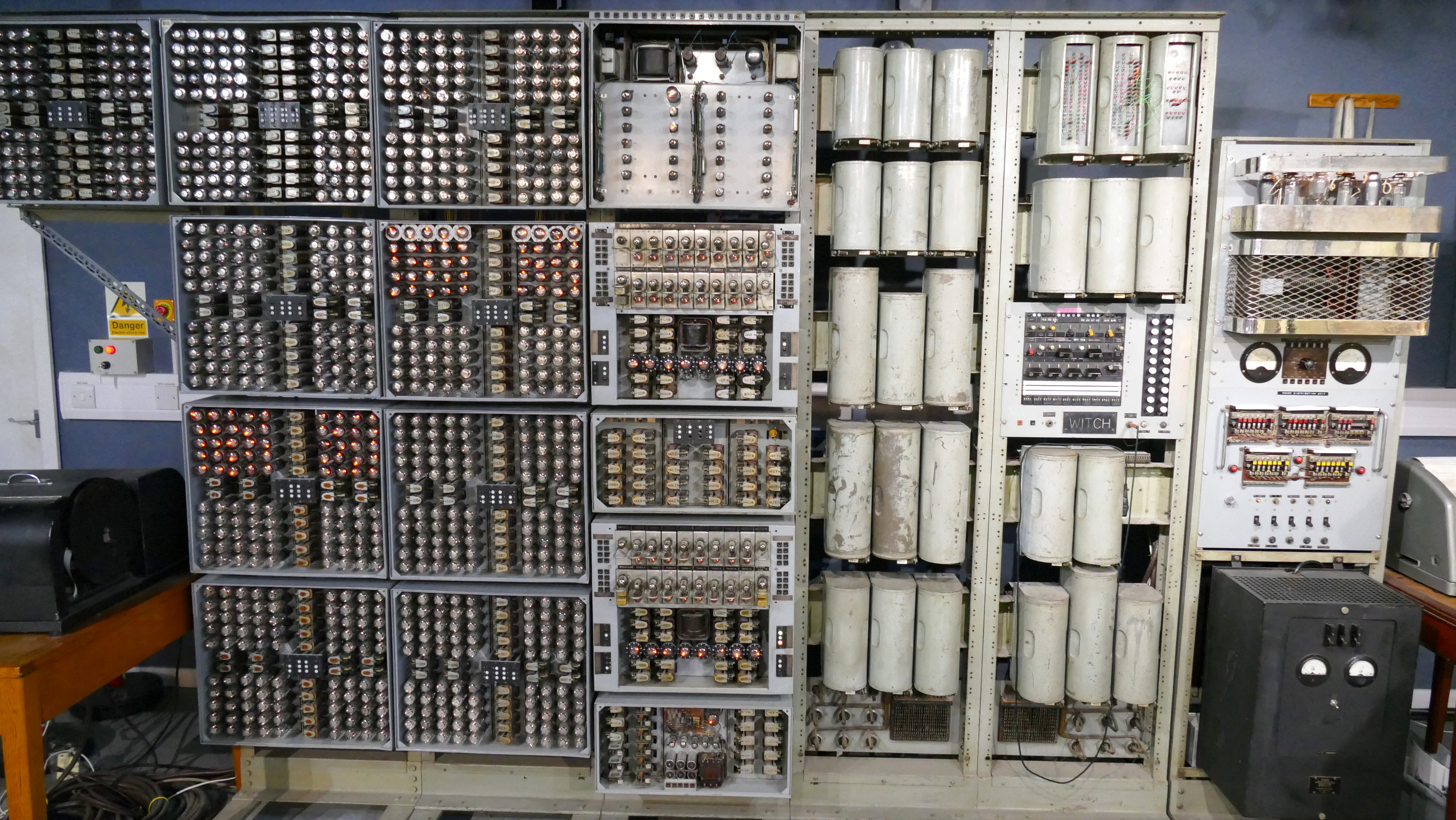
Harwell Dekatron computer (AKA Witch) - the world's oldest working computer

- Harwell Dekatron (aka the WITCH) from 1951. The world’s oldest original working digital computer. Planned in 1949 to automate the tedious work performed by teams of bright young graduates using mechanical calculators. Simplicity, reliability and unattended operation were the design priorities. Speed was a lesser consideration. This pioneering computer first ran in 1951 and by 1952 was using 828 Dekatron tubes for program and data storage, relays for sequence control and valve-based electronics for calculations. When it was pitched against a human mathematician to check the machine’s operation, the human kept up with it for 30 minutes, but then retired exhausted as the machine carried on remorselessly. It once ran unattended for ten days over a Christmas/New Year holiday period.

It was used at AEA Harwell until 1957, when a competition was held for colleges to see who could make best use of it. The competition was won by Wolverhampton and Staffordshire Technical College (later becoming Wolverhampton University) and they gave it its second name of the WITCH (Wolverhampton Instrument for Teaching Computation from Harwell). The WITCH was used in computer education for over 15 years until 1973.

For a while the machine was on display at Birmingham Museum of Science and Industry, following which it was disassembled and put into storage at Birmingham City Council Museums’ Collection Centre. In 2009 the machine was spotted by TNMOC volunteers who recognised what it was, and made a plan to bring it to TNMOC for restoration in full public view. This was completed in 2012.

- Hollerith Electronic Computer (HEC 1) from 1951 (As of September 2024 temporarily away from the museum). A relatively recent arrival, nearly as old as the WITCH, but not working.

HEC was based on an original design by Andrew Booth of Birkbeck College, London University. His design for a small scientific computer was adapted by Raymond Bird at BTM in 1951 to become a prototype commercial computer designed to work with the punched card equipment familiar to BTM's customers. The first production machine was delivered early in 1955, and the subsequent 1200 series of computers were highly successful.

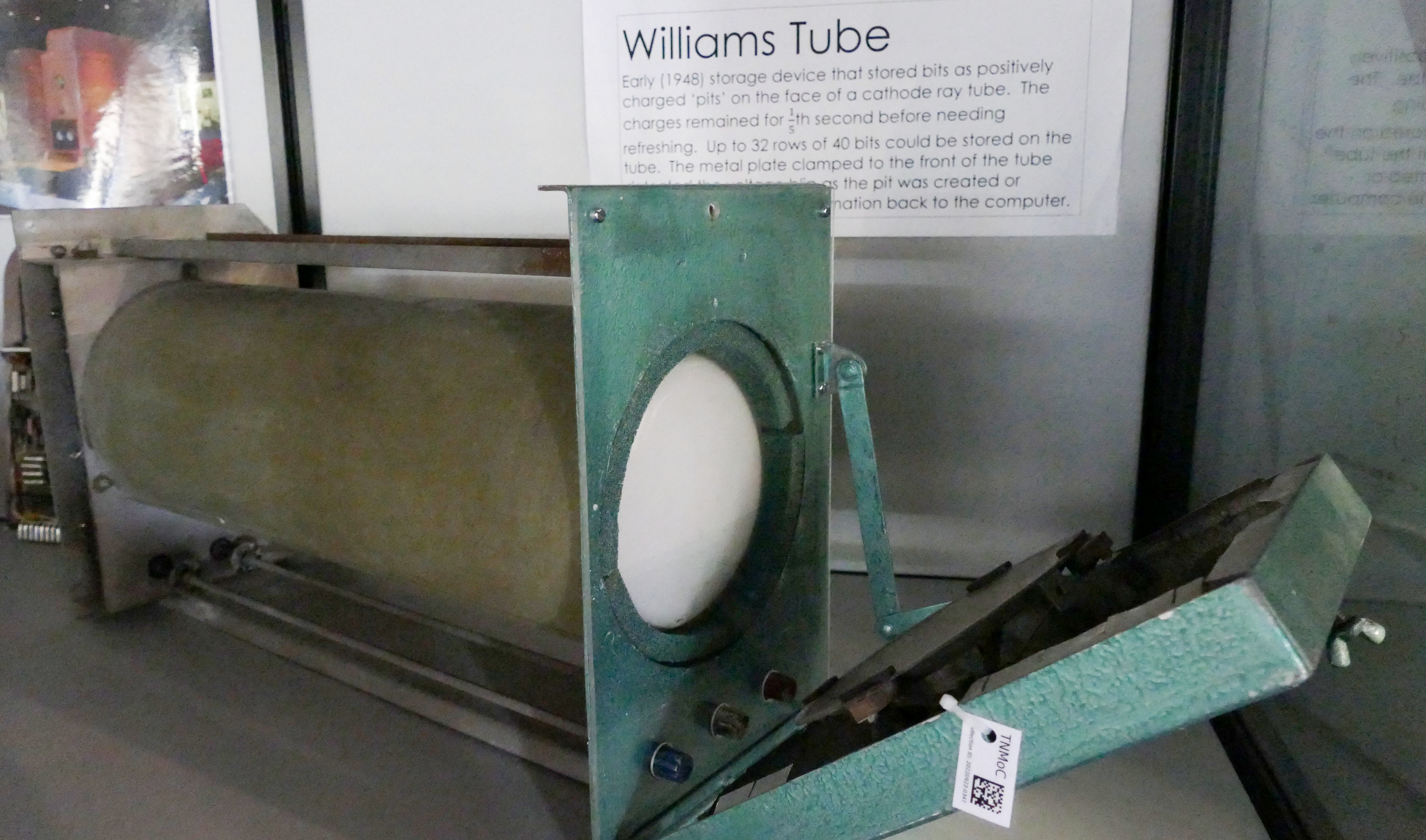
Williams (or Williams-Kilburn) Tube, the first truly random access computer memory technology

The HEC and EDSAC had a huge bearing on the development of computing in the UK. In particular, EDSAC led directly to LEO, the world’s first computer to run a business. The WITCH had less influence on the development of computers but in the 1960s and 1970s, and again now, is a great educational tool.

Among the smaller items are several from the productive partnership between the Victoria University of Manchester and the electrical engineering company Ferranti. These include:

- A Williams–Kilburn tube the first random-access memory device that gave rise to the world's first stored program computer, the Manchester Baby.
- Parts from both a Manchester Mark 1 computer and an Atlas supercomputer which was a world first with virtual memory and which, for a time was the world's most powerful computer.

=== Large Systems Gallery ===
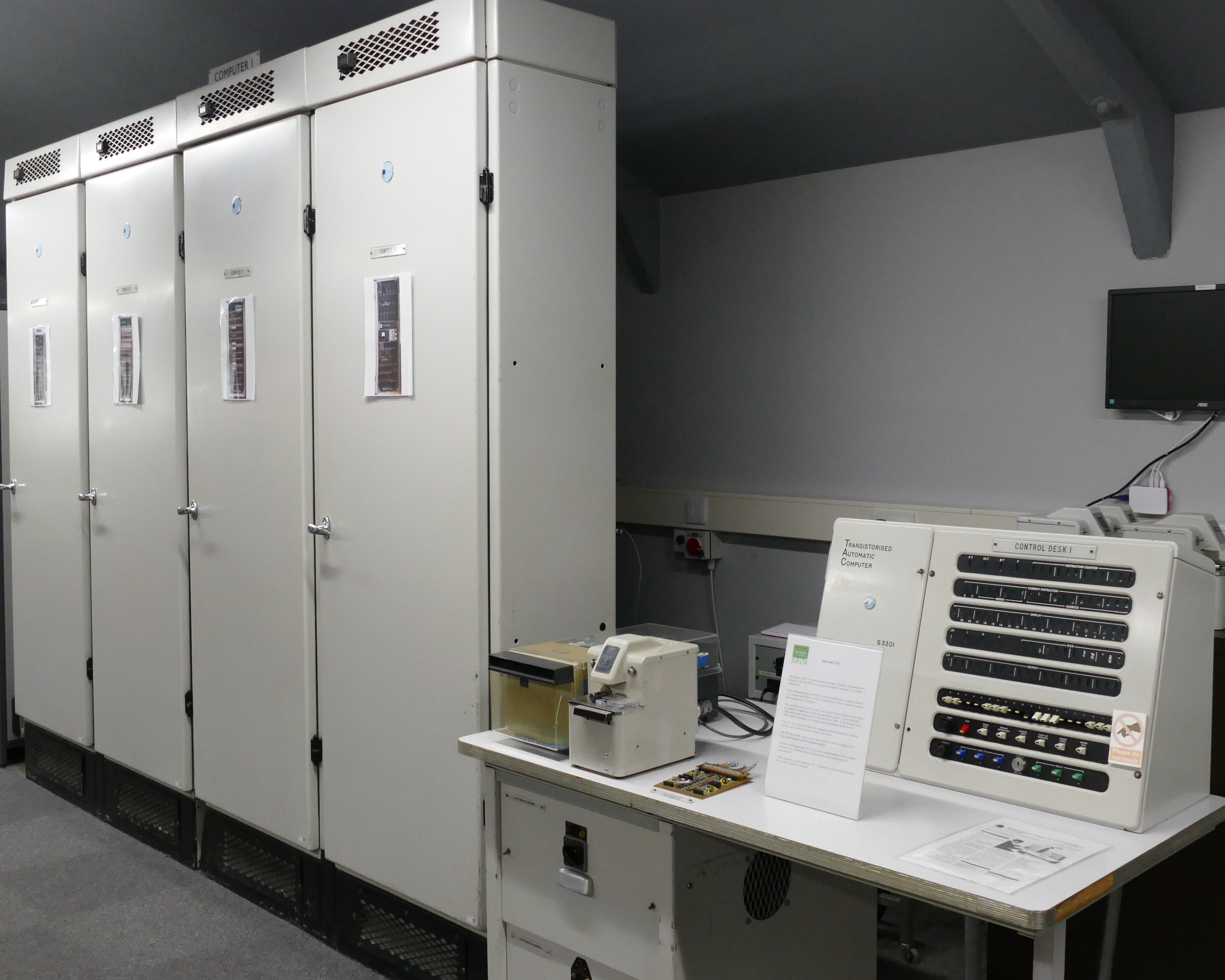
Marconi TAC from Wylfa nuclear power station

This gallery contains many machines of the 1960s, -70s and -80s and one or two from the 1990s. Many machines are in working order and include:

- Marconi TAC. Designed in 1959/60 this was one of the first transistorised computers made in the UK. The machine on show was one of a pair of machines that were used as a monitoring system for the Wylfa nuclear power station on Anglesey. They ran live 24/7 from 1968 to 2004.

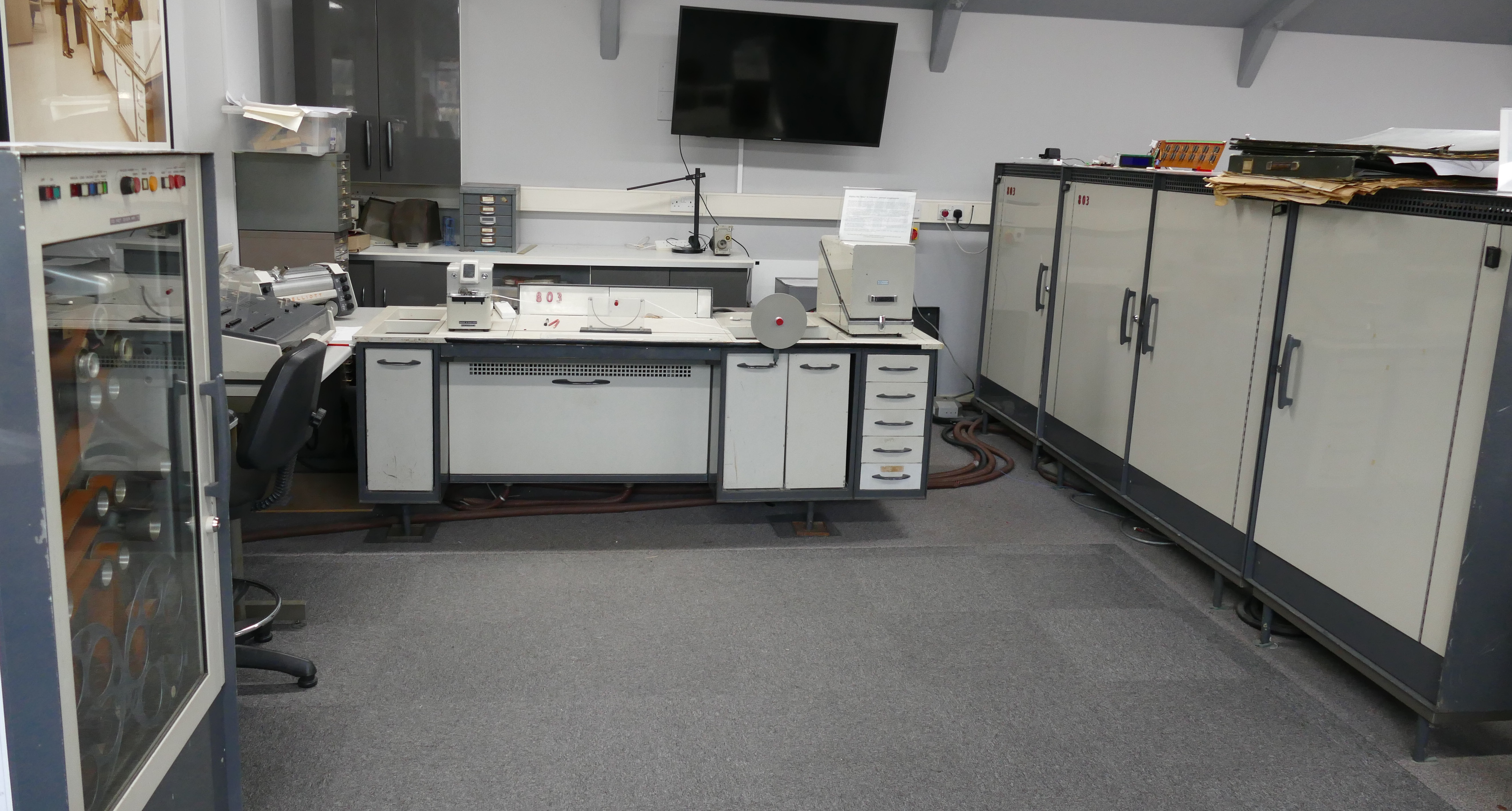
Elliott 803B

- Elliott 803. one of the first UK all transistor machines from around 1962. Despite having spent about 15 years in a farm barn, it was restored to working order and it is now demonstrated playing music, drawing graphs on a Calcomp plotter and solving mathematical problems.

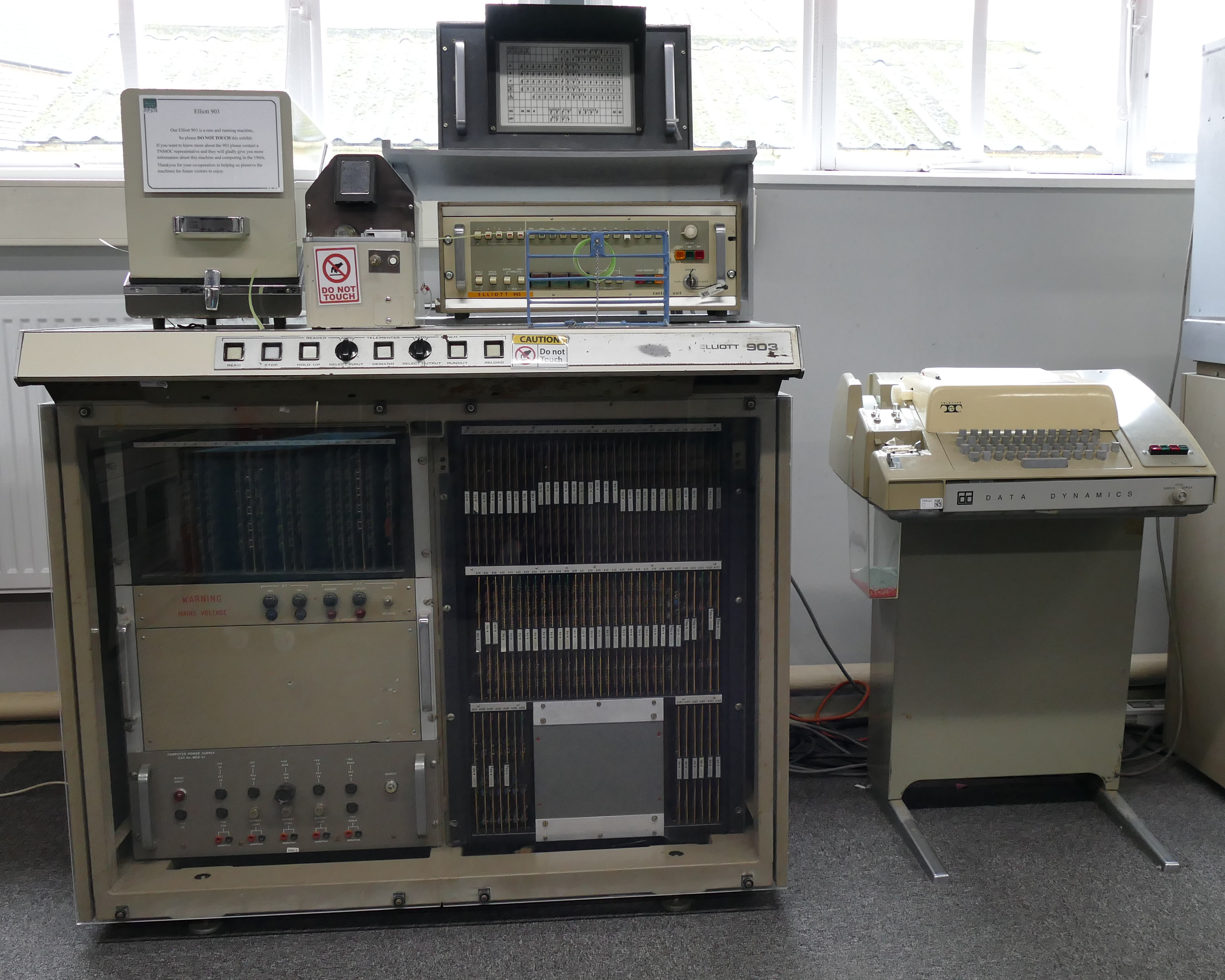
Elliott 903

- Elliott 903 which first came into production in 1965. It is an 18 bit discrete component machine, typically equipped with 8 or 16K of core store memory. As a desk-sized machine it was popular with universities and colleges as a teaching machine, with small research laboratories as a scientific processor, and also as a versatile system for use in industrial process control. The machine was usually programmed in symbolic assembly code, ALGOL or FORTRAN II. The machine on display was donated to the museum in 2011 by the late Oliver Harlow, who had it in storage for many years, and then used it from the 1970s into the 1980s.

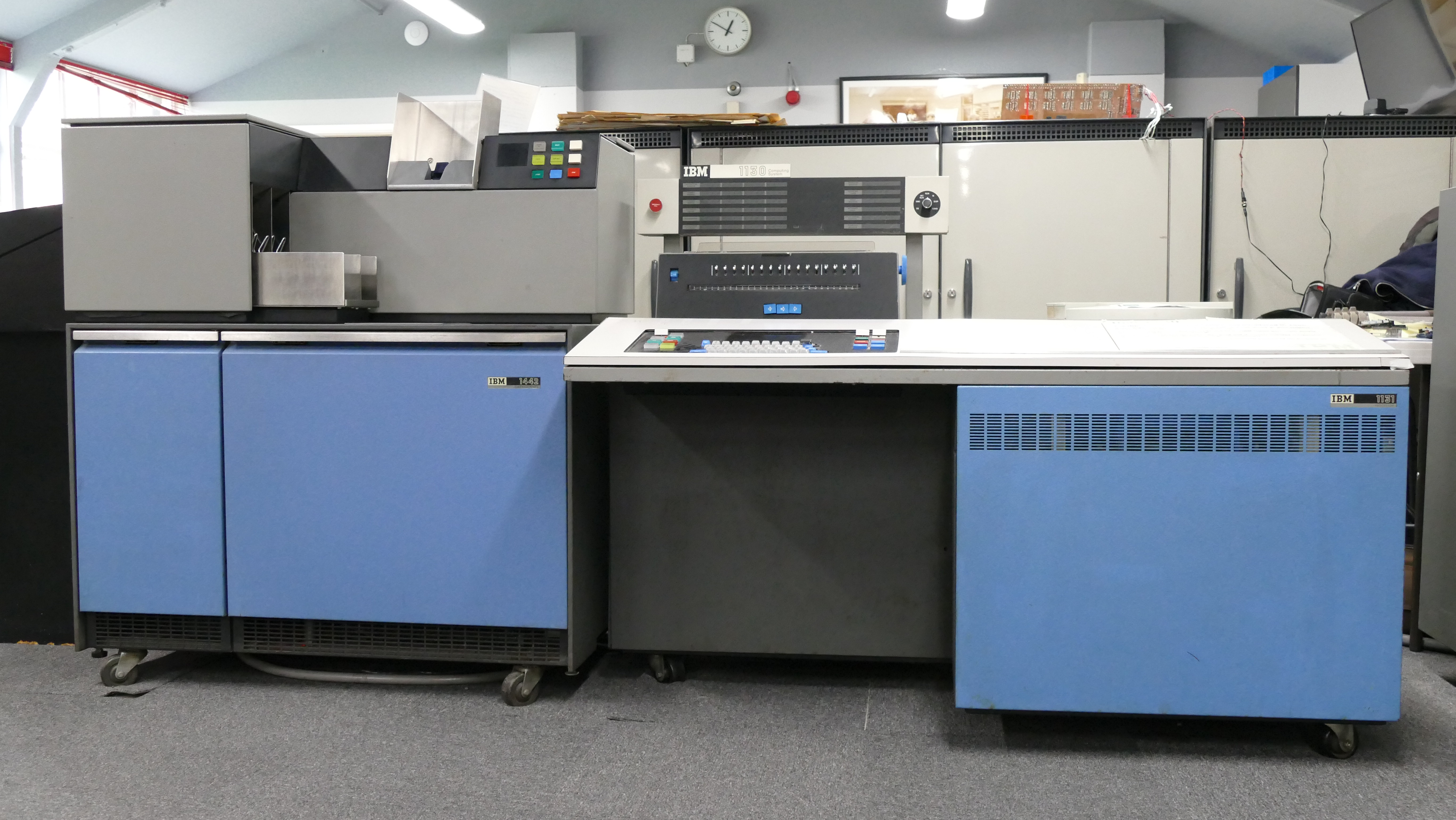
IBM 1130

- IBM 1130 introduced in 1965. This is a rare surviving IBM computer — as most were leased, and scrapped at end of lease period. An estimated 10,000 systems are believed to have been built during a working life spanning nearly 20 years. IBM 1130s for the US market were manufactured in San Jose, but for the rest of the world they were manufactured in Greenock, Scotland.

As well as being used in small to medium sized offices, it was marketed to price-sensitive, computing-intensive technical markets, like engineering and education, where colleges and universities used them for in both scientific and 'office' roles.

The machine at TNMOC is on long term loan from Liverpool University who purchased it in 1968. After a period of non-academic use it was transferred to the Nuclear Physics Department around 1982 where it was used to digitise bubble chamber trace photos produced at CERN. Before it arrived at the museum, it had been in storage for over 25 years.

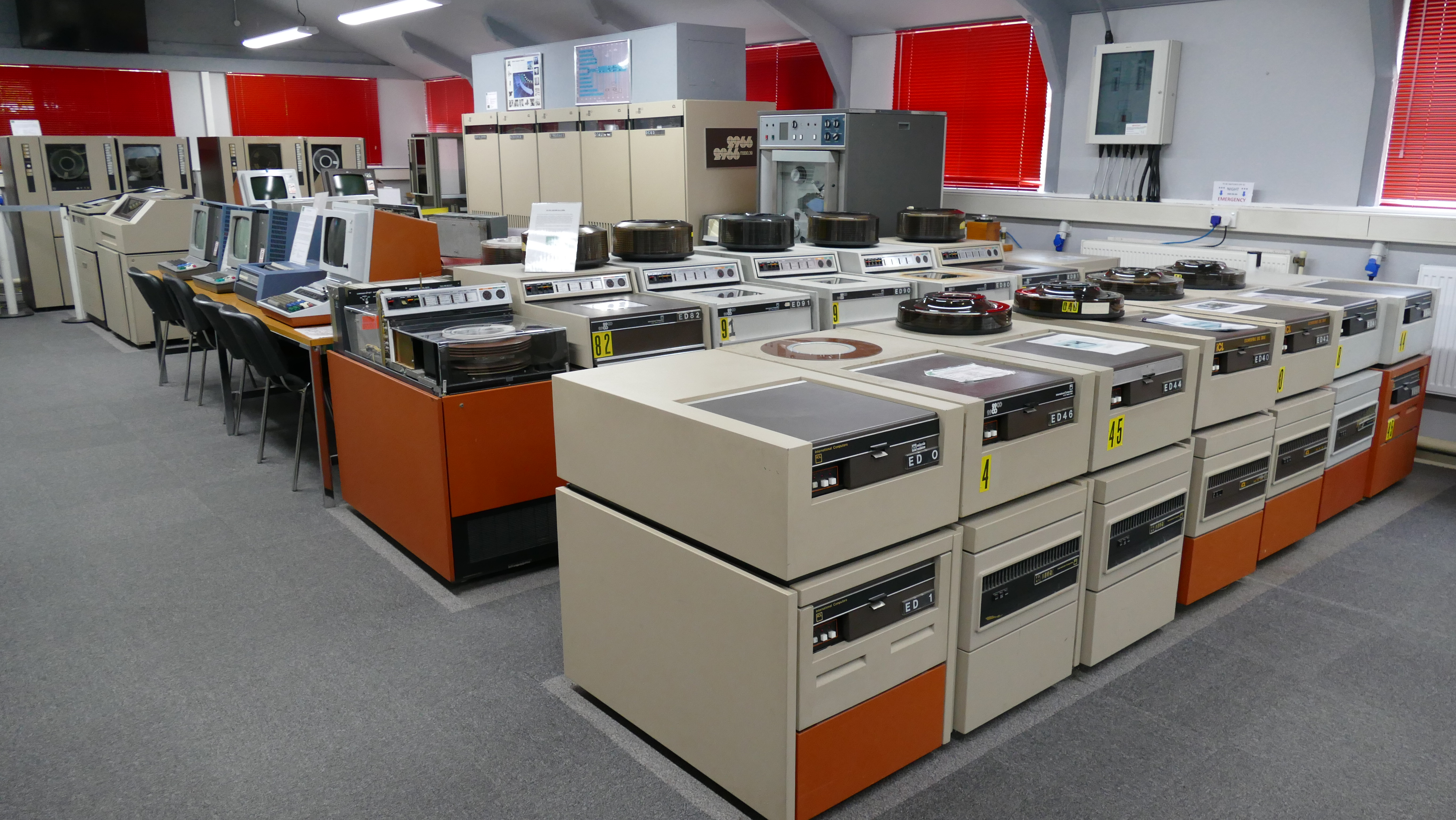
ICL 2966 mainframe

- ICL 2966 (1970s/1980s) This huge machine — occupying almost a third of the floor space of the gallery — is a true mainframe which is rare sight today. ICL was formed in 1968 from the merger of ICT and EEC. It produced the 2900 Series as a successor to the 1900 Series and System 4 ranges. The design was influenced by many sources, particularly the Manchester University MU5. The system provided a Virtual Machine Environment (VME) operating system and the ability to run 1900 Series computer software.

The museum's 2966 was donated by Tarmac who used it as a 1900, until it was decommissioned in 1999, due in part, to fears that it would be affected by the ′Millennium Bug′. Almost all large mainframes were broken up for scrap when they reached the end of their working lives, but Tony Sale, one of the founders of the Computer Conservation Society (CCS), who was directing the Colossus Rebuild, managed to persuade ICL to pay for its transport to Bletchley Park.

Nearly ten years passed before The National Museum of Computing was formed and the system was taken out of storage and set up in this gallery in 2008. Unfortunately the damp conditions in the semi-derelict buildings that the machine lived in for so many years took their toll. The long and difficult process of restoring the system to working order has been underway since its relocation. The magnetic disc units for these machines require specially filtered and temperature-controlled air which is not available in the 1944-vintage Block H building. Instead, a solid-state device that acts as a virtual disc system was built. The configuration from Tarmac did not include any video terminals, but three original ICL terminals were acquired and restored. The machine is run as a 1900 under the George 3 operating system. Visitors can now use the terminals to play noughts and crosses against the computer, and to explore the twisty windy passages of the classic Colossal Cave adventure game.

- PDP-11 The PDP-11/73 (1995) in this gallery served as the support computer for the Dungeness B Nuclear Power Station. It is a 16-bit LSI minicomputer.

=== Pop-up Gallery ===
This small gallery is used for a variety short-term exhibitions. These have included:

- Charles Babbage - Who do YOU think he is?
- BBC though the decades
- Raspberry Pi 10th Anniversary
- 1980s British Home Computing
- Open University 50th Anniversary

=== Software Gallery ===
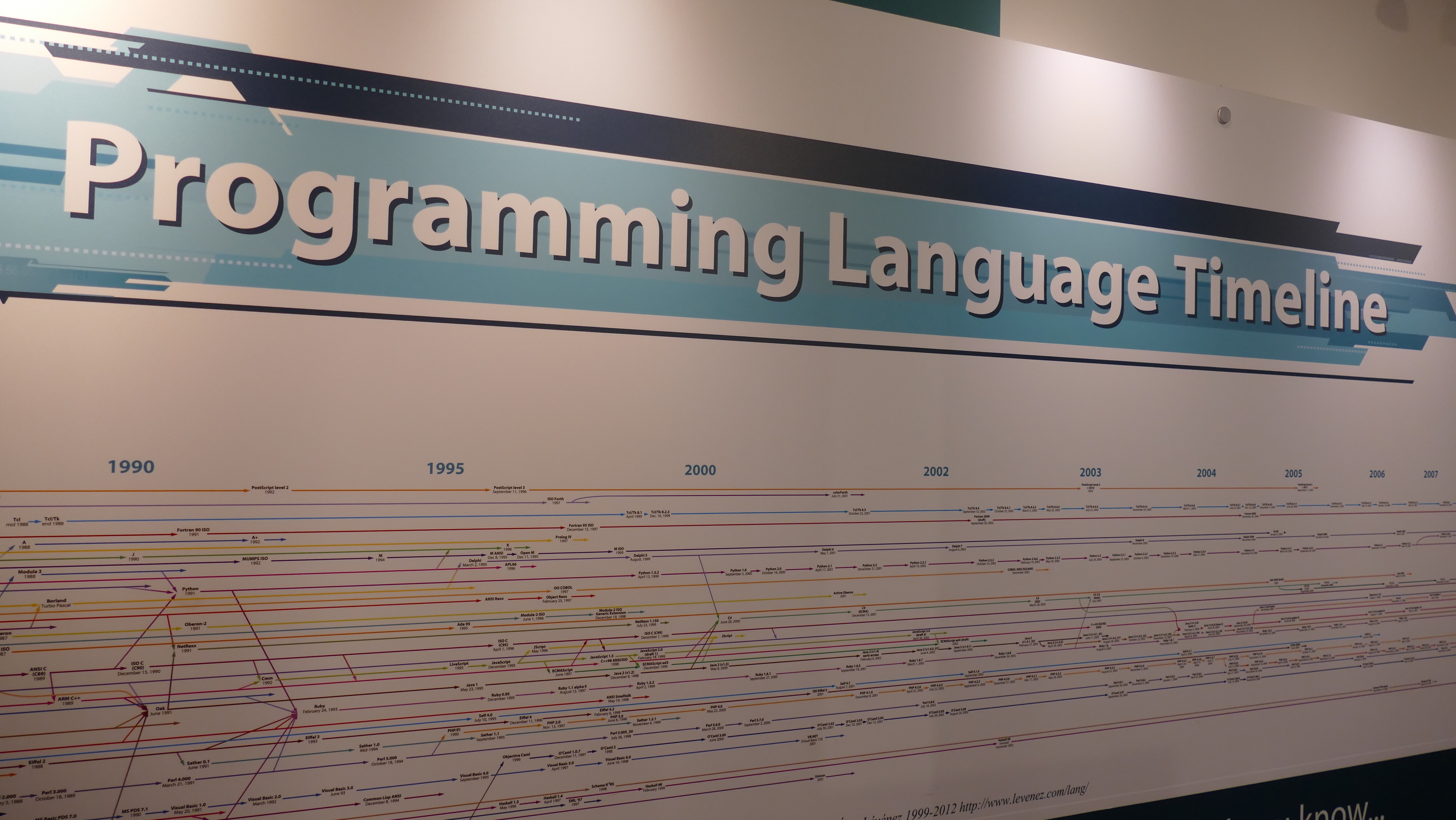
Languages Timeline

This gallery exhibits a variety of items including:

- A chart of programming languages covering much of one wall, which shows the ancestors of the languages used by today's programmers.
- A display demonstrating the pervasiveness of software in the home
- A ′cutaway PC′ showing the internal components and connections between them.
- A robotics display with a robot originally produced for the 1980's BBC Micro now powered by a more modern machine.
- A computer language database to which visitors can add.

=== PC Gallery ===
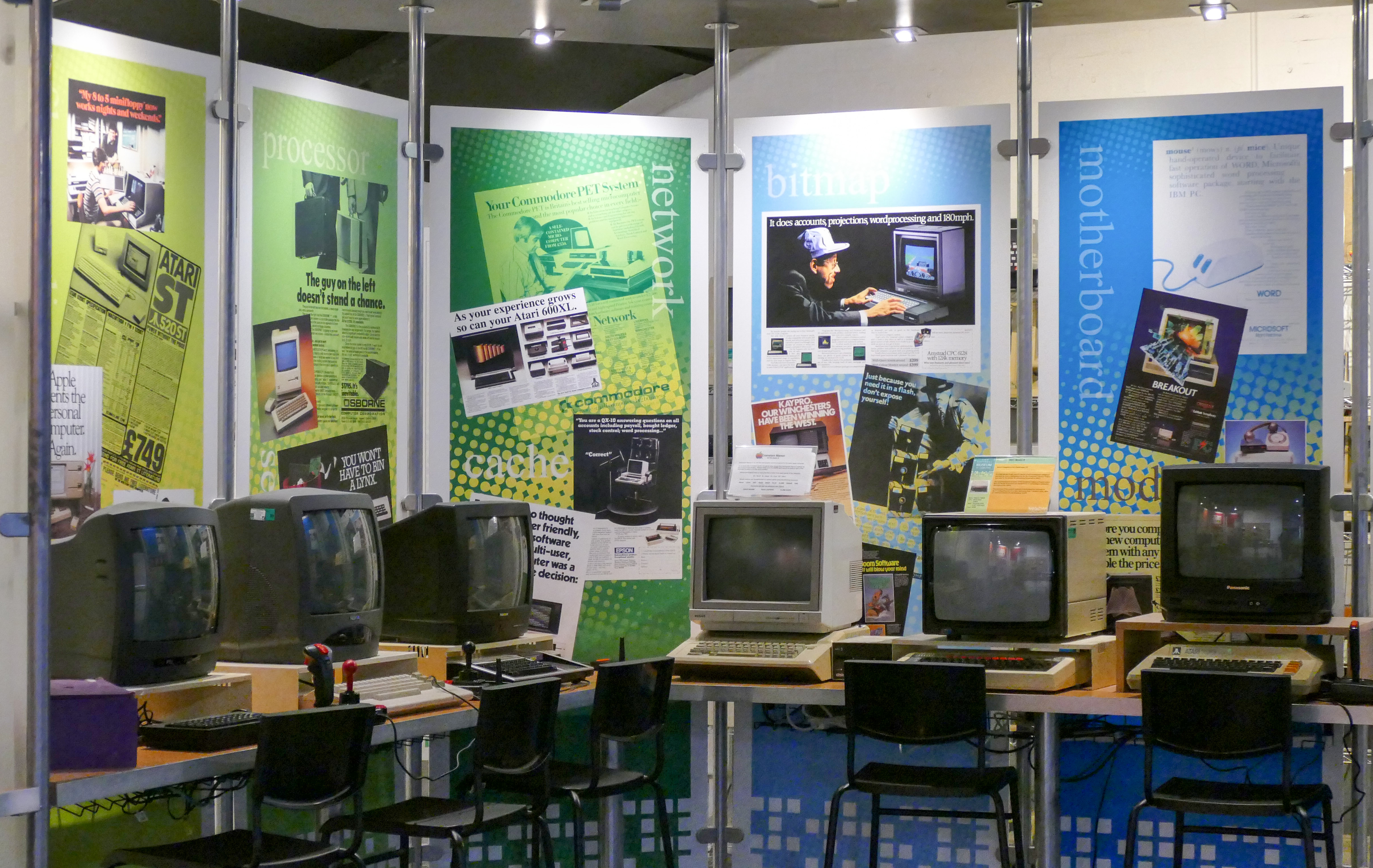
Hands-on PC area with vintage computer games

This gallery exhibits many of the familiar home and business computers of the 1980s and 1990s. Visitors can play some of the popular home computer games of the time as well. On show are, amongst others:

- An early desktop PDP-8 from the 1960s.
- Examples of early self-build machines from Nascom, Altair, Sinclair.
- Popular home and business computers from IBM, Apple, Acorn, Commodore, Atari including the now famous NeXTcube similar to the one on which Sir Tim Berners-Lee developed the first web browser. This is not the actual one — which belongs to CERN — and can be seen in the Science Museum, London.
- A display showing the evolution of portable computers, the earliest of which were described as ″Desktops with a Handle″. Examples are shown from Osborne, IBM, Kaypro, Amstrad and others. These were used primarily for business applications.
- A timeline of world events contemporaneous with these developments.

=== Exhibition space ===
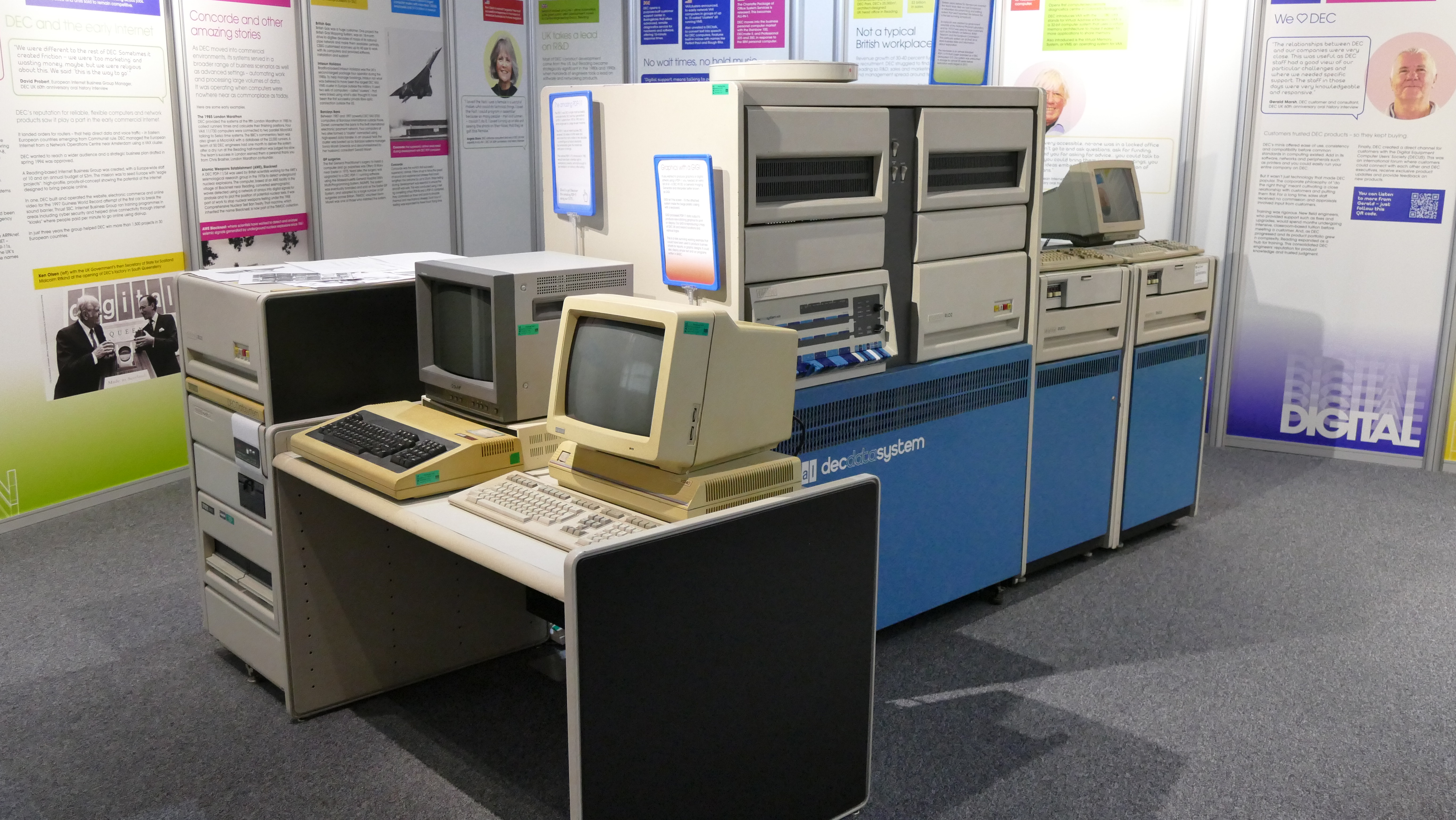
DEC 60 exhibition, October 2024

Various substantial exhibitions reside here for periods of months or years.

- The National Air Traffic Services (NATS) Engineering Training College used to be located at Bletchley Park. It provided an exhibition in this gallery which used the actual equipment — with its panoramic three-screen display — that was used to train air traffic controllers.
- Following that there was an exhibition entitled "Flowers to Fibre" that was developed jointly by the museum and the Communications Museum Trust. Tommy Flowers — of Colossus fame — and his successors at the General Post Office (GPO) and British Telecom (BT) worked for half a century starting in 1947 to enhance the speed and reliability of the existing copper voice network. The exhibition took visitors on a journey through the story from the first pilots of the prototype digital exchanges, to the planned national switch from copper to fibre after 2025.
- In July 2024 an exhibition commemorating the 60th Anniversary Exhibition of Digital Equipment Corp's (DEC) presence in the United Kingdom was opened here. Their offices were in Reading and this exhibition was developed in collaboration with Reading Museum, DEXODUS, and DECUS.

=== Simulation Gallery ===
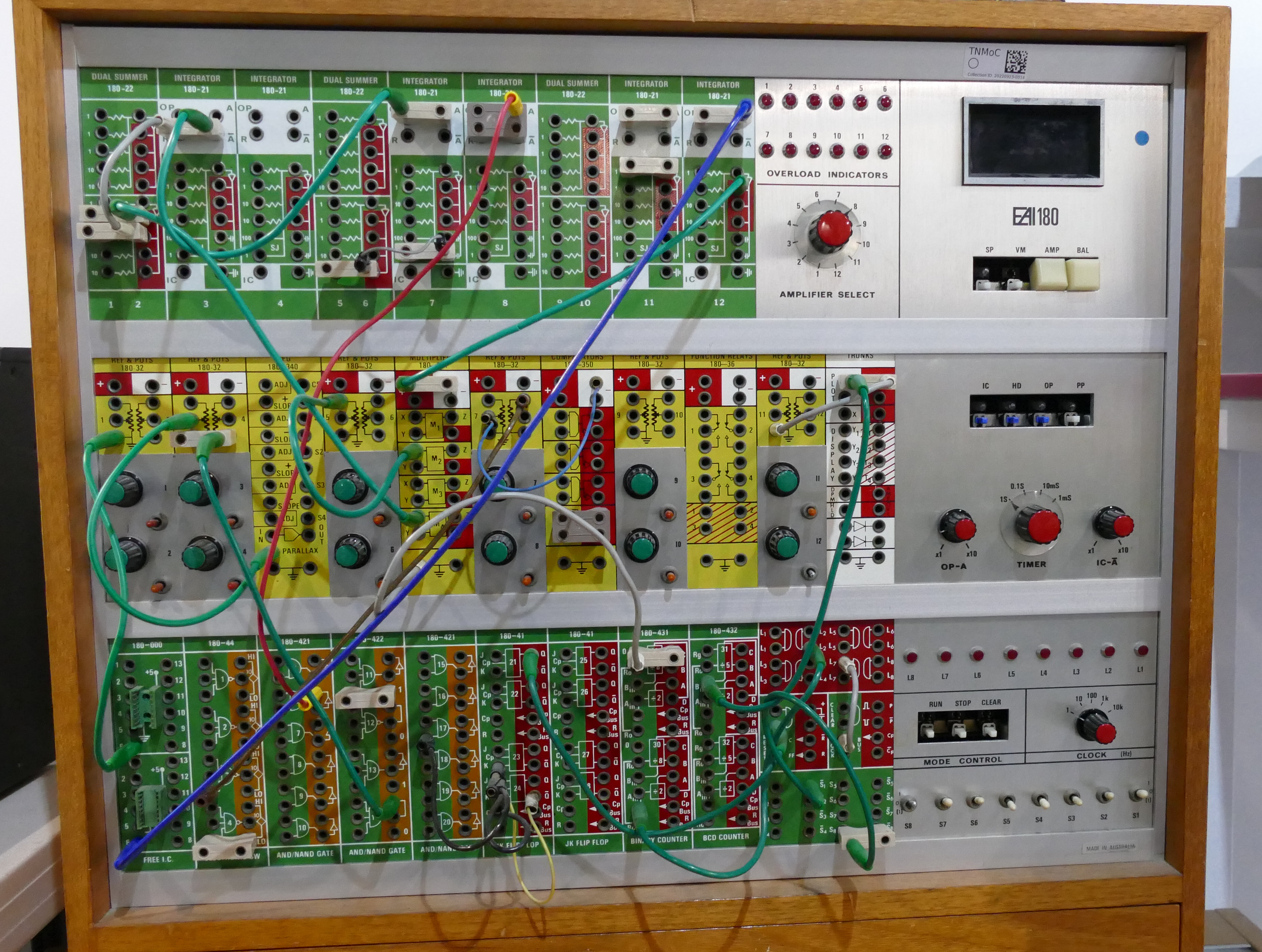
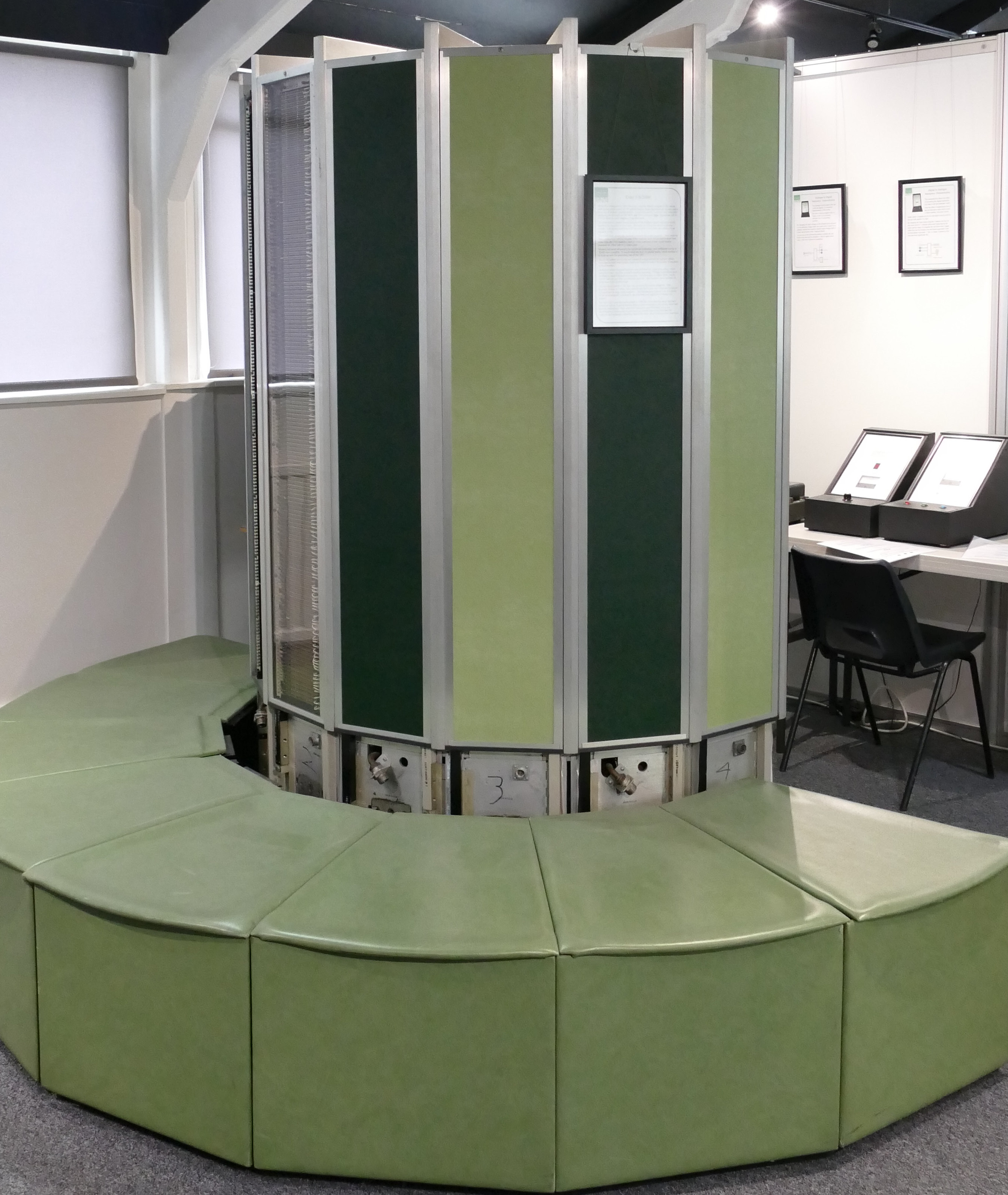
Analogue computer (left) and Cray supercomputer (right)

This gallery covers a wide range of systems that were used in some way to simulate a reality. These include:

- A Cray-1 supercomputer used to simulate weather patterns and nuclear reactions.
- Games consoles rendering artificial virtual worlds. Using these, visitors can play early computer games, including Space Invaders.
- Silicon Graphics workstations used to view 3-D crystalline models.
- Analogue computers used to simulate real world actions like dampening springs in a suspension system.

=== Innovation Hub and BBC classroom ===
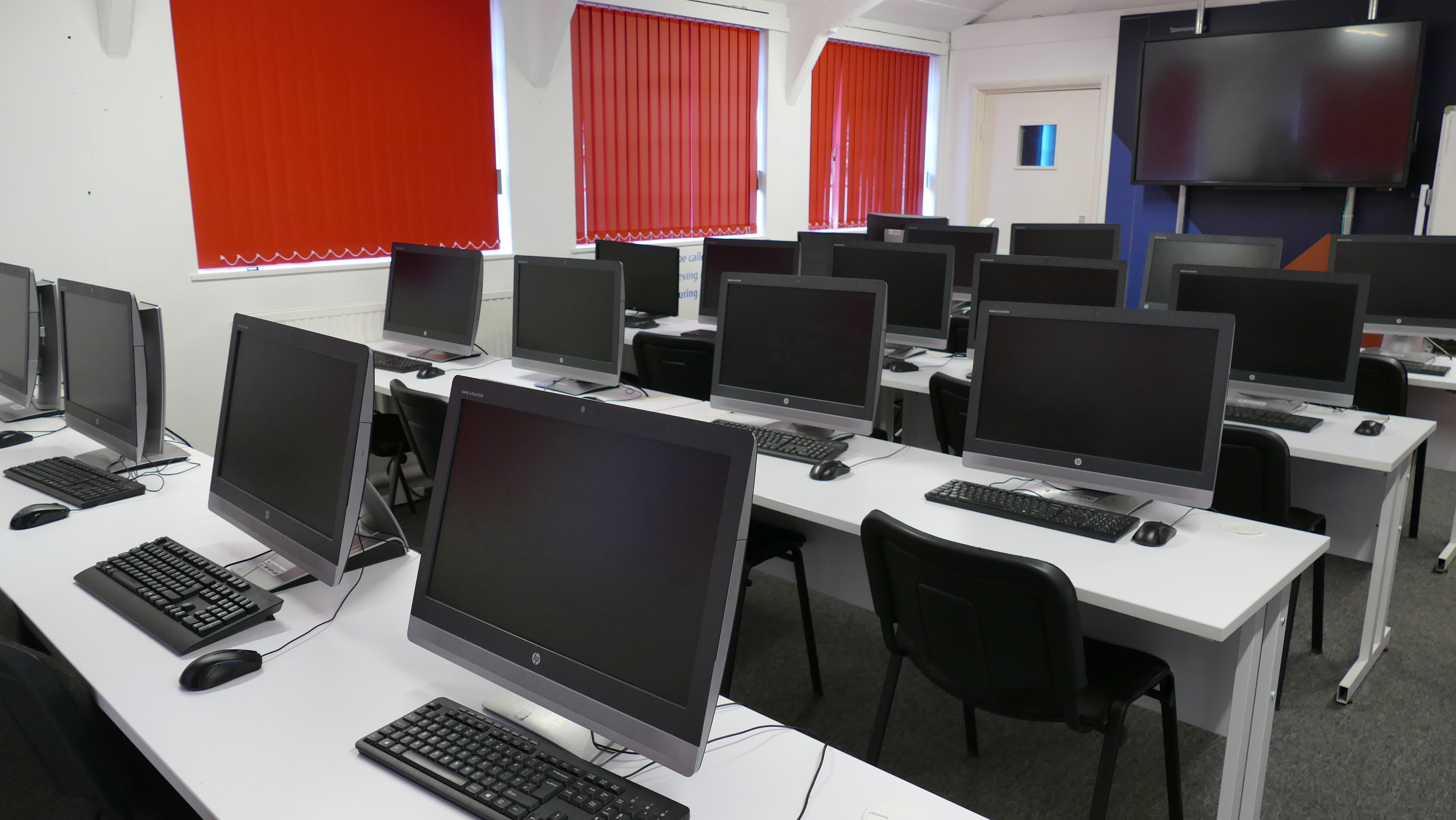
Innovation Hub Classroom

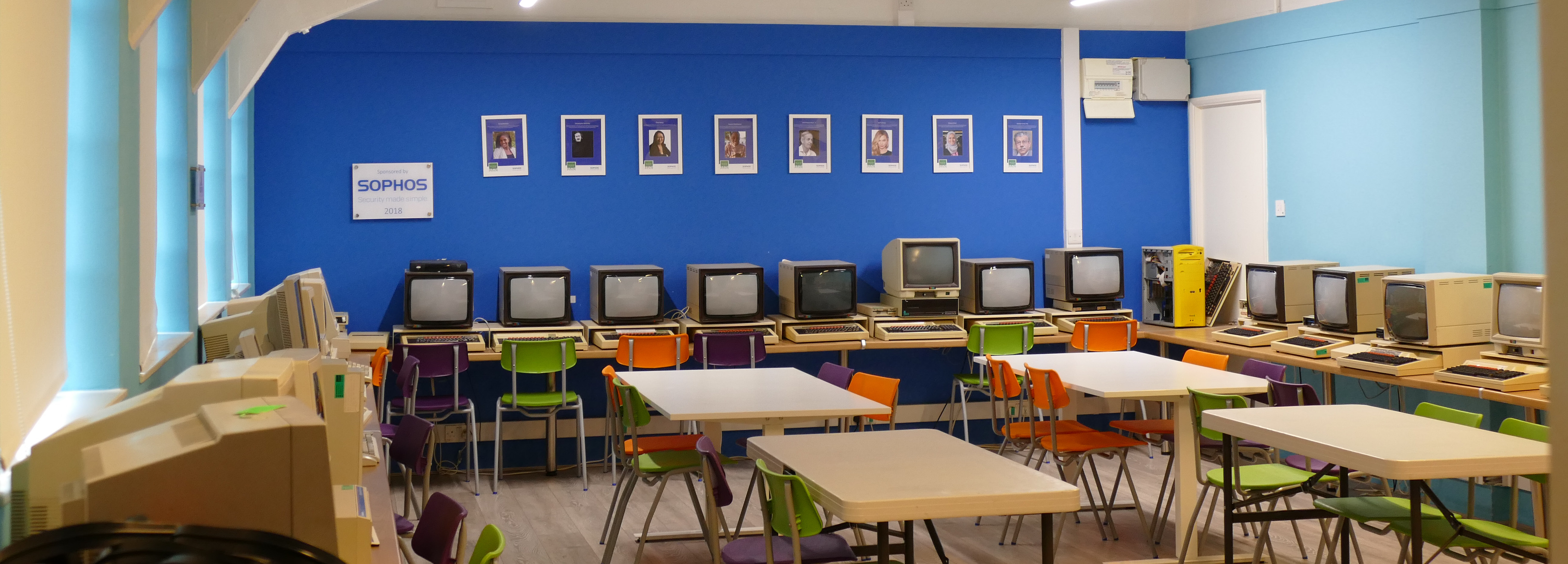
BBC Micros Classroom

These are two adjacent and interconnected education areas. The Innovation Hub was equipped by Fujitsu as part of its Education Ambassador Programme. It contains an array of Fujitsu technology including tablets, hybrid devices, laptops and desktop PCs.

Next door is the BBC Classroom which contains a large set of working vintage BBC Micro computers. This machine was the winning design for the BBC’s Computer Literacy Project and was first demonstrated by Acorn Computers in 1981. The resulting series of computers became a mainstay of British schools in the 1980s. More than 1.5 million were sold, and their rugged design ensured that they survived the school environment. This classroom is used for workshops, activities and talks for a wide range of groups including school and academic groups, families and special interest groups.

=== Internet Gallery ===
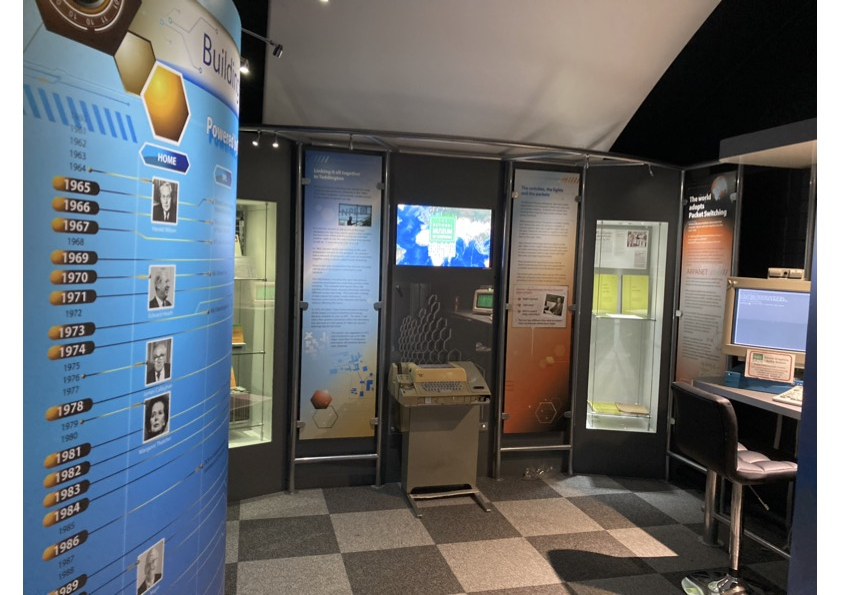
Internet Gallery

This gallery was sponsored by the UK's National Physical Laboratory. It tells the story of how, in 1965, Donald Davies, a member of the team there responsible for building Alan Turing's Automatic Computing Engine (ACE) thought of the idea of a network of interconnected data terminals to access time-shared computers. Rather than a large number of lines, each carrying only a small amount of data, his conception was for the data to be broken up into short messages in a fixed format, which he named ′packets′, with computer 'nodes' running software to switch the packets at high-speeds between physical circuits. This concept of packet switching was first presented in public in the US at the inaugural ACM symposium in Gatlinburg, 1967, and in the UK at the IFIP Congress, 1968, in Edinburgh. Davies' design of data communication for computer networks was adopted by ARPA, a research agency of the US Department of Defense and incorporated into its design of ARPANET, the forerunner of the Internet. ARPANET's first link was established between the University of California and Stanford Research Institute in November 1969, by which time the NPL's packet-switched network was already operational.

== Funding ==
The museum entirely depends on voluntary and corporate donations and admission charges. Fund-raising continues and donors have included Bletchley Park Capital Partners, Fujitsu, Google UK, CreateOnline, Ceravision, Insight software, PGP Corporation, IBM, NPL, HP Labs, British Computer Society (BCS), Black Marble, and the School of Computer Science at the University of Hertfordshire.

The museum conducted a crowdfunding campaign in March 2018 to raise funds to build a new gallery for the Bombe. The campaign raised over £43,000 via crowd-funding and an additional £20,000 via direct donations.

The museum secured £500,000 from the Post Office Remembrance Fellowship, conditional on the raising a further £150,000 in matched funding. This was for the restoration of the 80-year-old roof over the Tunny and Colossus galleries and the refurbishment of several museum spaces. In January 2023 they launched a crowdfunding appeal for the matched funding and raised sufficient for the work to start early in 2024.

== See also ==
- The Centre for Computing History, Cambridge
- The Museum of Computing, Swindon
- Retro Computer Museum, Leicester
- A museum at the IBM site in Hursley, Winchester
- Science Museum, London
- Science and Industry Museum, Manchester
