= Patrick Baudelaire =

French computer scientist (1945–2026)

- Born: March 30, 1945; Hanoi, French Indochina
- Died: August 27, 2026 (aged 81); Paris, France
- Education: École Polytechnique; École nationale des ponts et chaussées University of Utah
- Known for: Desktop publishing, CGI
- Scientific career
- Workplaces: Xerox PARC; DEC (PRL); Thomson Multimedia
- Thesis: Digital Picture Processing and Psychophysics: A Study of Brightness Perception.
- Doctoral advisor: Thomas Stockham

Patrick Baudelaire (March 30, 1945 – August 27, 2026) was a French computer scientist and engineer recognized as a pioneer in desktop publishing and computer graphics.

== Early life and education ==
Baudelaire entered the École Polytechnique as part of the class of 1964 before completing his engineering studies at the École nationale des ponts et chaussées.

Following his longtime friend Henri Gouraud, he moved to the United States to join the first cohort of PhD students in the University of Utah's Computer Science Department, which was led by David Evans and shaped by Ivan Sutherland.

This cohort included several future pioneers who would shape the computer graphics industry, such as Henri Gouraud (creator of Gouraud shading), John Warnock (future co-founder of Adobe), Alan Kay (pioneer of object-oriented programming and Smalltalk), Bui Tuong Phong (creator of the Phong reflection model), James Clark (co-founder of Silicon Graphics and Netscape), Ed Catmull (co-founder of Pixar), Henry Fuchs, and Fred Parke.

The department's faculty and researchers included Bob Taylor, William Newman, Bob Barton, Anthony Hearn, and Thomas Stockham, who served as Baudelaire's PhD advisor.

Baudelaire defended his doctoral thesis in 1973, entitled Digital Picture Processing and Psychophysics: A Study of Brightness Perception.

== Career at Xerox PARC ==
Upon completing his PhD, Baudelaire joined Xerox PARC in 1973 under the recruitment of Bob Taylor, remaining with the laboratory for six years.

At PARC, he contributed to the software ecosystem of the Xerox Alto, working alongside researchers such as Bob Sproull, William Newman, Jay Israel, Howard Sturgis, Jim Mitchell, and Jim Morris. His work also aligned with the broader evolution of interactive computing environments documented during this era.

=== Draw (1975) ===
Building upon William Newman's Markup program, Baudelaire developed Draw, an interactive drawing application for the Xerox Alto. It incorporated the manipulation of lines, curves, and graphical objects, establishing it as one of the earliest WYSIWYG drawing applications.

=== FRED and Digital Typography ===
He also designed FRED, a font-editing system that contributed to digital typography and the rendering of graphical interfaces.

The underlying technical framework—combining vector splines converted into bitmaps—was conceived alongside Bob Sproull and implemented by Baudelaire, influencing subsequent document architectures such as PostScript developed by John Warnock and Charles Geschke. His later reflections on digital type design and automated workflows were also documented in academic presentations.

== Return to France, Tangram, and Centre Mondial Informatique (CMI) ==
In 1979, Baudelaire returned to France to raise his children. He initially consulted for TECSI, a GSI subsidiary specializing in embedded software.

In 1981, alongside Henri Gouraud, Michel Gangnet, and Bernard Scheurer, he co-founded the technology startup Tangram.

Baudelaire and Gouraud temporarily paused entrepreneurial ventures to participate in the World Center for Computing and Human Resources (Centre Mondial Informatique et Ressource Humaine), an initiative spearheaded by Jean-Jacques Servan-Schreiber and Nicholas Negroponte aimed at computer literacy, which featured contributions from figures such as Seymour Papert, Ben Shneiderman, and Alan Kay.

== DEC Paris Research Laboratory (PRL) ==
After the CMI project did not meet expected outcomes, the two companions effectively launched Tangram into its operational phase. However, due to early venture capital constraints in France, Tangram navigated continuous financial hurdles.

Bob Taylor, then director of the DEC Systems Research Center (SRC), intervened to change this trajectory. Supported by DEC executive leadership, Digital Equipment Corporation acquired Tangram in 1987 to form the foundation of the Paris Research Laboratory (PRL).

The laboratory became internationally recognized as one of the first in the world to pioneer reconfigurable computing and the exploration of binary decision diagrams.

Researchers developed Programmable Active Memories (PAM) and the PeRLe systems, which were FPGA-based coprocessors capable of delivering massive performance speedups for compute-intensive applications such as large-number multiplication, data compression, and image processing.

Additionally, the lab made fundamental contributions to formal methods, programming languages, the theory of concurrency, mobility, and term rewriting—exploring logic programming and type theory through initiatives like the Paradise project and its Wild_LIFE interpreter—all of which were documented through its technical reports.

The PRL brought together many prominent French figures and also served as an incubator for future successful entrepreneurs and researchers, such as Gérard Berry, Jean-Jacques Lévy, Jean Vuillemin, François Bourdoncle, Patrice Bertin, and Hervé Touati.

The PRL operated for seven years prior to DEC's structural reorganization.

== Later career ==
In his later career, Baudelaire served as Vice President of Research and Innovation at Thomson Multimedia (later Technicolor), directing corporate R&D strategies in digital technologies. He also contributed to the scientific council of the GET network, precursors to the Institut Mines-Télécom (IMT).
