= Ivan Sutherland's head-mounted 3D display =

First augmented reality head-mounted display (HMD) system

Ivan Sutherland's head-mounted 3D display, also called The Sword of Damocles, is the first augmented reality (or virtual reality) display system made. It was made by Ivan Sutherland in 1968. According to Ivan Sutherland, the name "Sword of Damocles" was merely a joke name for the mechanical system that supported and tracked (using attached wires) the actual head-mounted display below it. It happened to look like a giant overhead cross, hence the joke. The system was actually called "the head-mounted display", which is perhaps the first recorded use of the term "HMD", and he preferred "Stereoscopic-Television Apparatus for Individual Use."

Ivan Sutherland's head-mounted 3D display is widely considered to be the first functional augmented reality system, featuring optical transparency. Morton Heilig is widely credited with the first virtual reality stereoscopic head-mounted viewing apparatus (known as "Stereoscopic-Television Apparatus for Individual Use" or "Telesphere Mask") earlier, patented in 1960.

The system was created in 1968 by computer scientist Ivan Sutherland with the help of his students Bob Sproull, Quintin Foster, and Danny Cohen. Before this, Sutherland had been working toward what he termed "the ultimate display", which could theoretically simulate any kind of display, including 2D monitors. Ivan Sutherland was already well respected for his accomplishments in computer graphics, such as Sketchpad. At MIT's Lincoln Laboratory beginning in 1966, Sutherland and his colleagues performed what are widely believed to be the first experiments with head-mounted displays of different kinds.

== Features ==
The device was primitive both in terms of user interface and realism, and the graphics comprising the virtual environment were simple wireframe rooms. Sutherland's system displayed output from a computer program in the stereoscopic display. The perspective that the software showed the user would depend on the position of the user's gaze – which is why head tracking was necessary. The HMD had to be attached to a mechanical arm suspended from the ceiling of the lab partially due to its weight, and primarily to track head movements via linkages. The formidable appearance of the mechanism inspired its name. While using The Sword of Damocles, a user had to have his or her head securely fastened into the device to perform the experiments. At this time, the various components being tested were not fully integrated with one another.

== Development ==
When Sutherland moved to the University of Utah in the late 1960s, work on integrating the various components into a single HMD system was begun. By the end of the decade, the first fully functional integrated HMD system was operational. The first display application was a cube suspended in the air in front of the user. The system itself consisted of six subsystems: a clipping divider, matrix multiplier, vector generator, headset, head-position sensor, and a general-purpose computer – which would make these the components of the first virtual reality machine as we know them today. The unit was partially see-through, so the users were not completely cut off from their surroundings. This translucence combined with the other features in their infancy is why the system is often cited as a precursor to augmented reality technology as well.

== Alleged predecessors ==
=== Philco HMD ===
Kalawsky contends that the first HMD fieldwork was conducted by Philco in 1961. Their system used a head mounted display to monitor conditions in another room, using magnetic tracking to monitor the user's head movements. The Philco HMD displayed actual video from a remotely mounted camera. The position of the camera was moved according to the tracked head movements, creating a sense of telepresence.

=== Bell Helicopter ===
In 1963, Bell Helicopter company in Fort Worth, Texas, experimented with a pilot-controlled night vision system. The servo-controlled remote viewing device employed a headset displaying an augmented view of the ground for the pilot via an infrared camera mounted under the helicopter. The remote vision system display was similar to the Philco system. Ivan Sutherland's breakthrough was to imagine a computer to supply graphics output to the viewing device. Sutherland modestly stated, "My little contribution to virtual reality was to realize we didn't need a camera – we could substitute a computer. However, in those days no computer was powerful enough to do the job so we had to build special equipment".
