= William Newman (computer scientist) =

British computer scientist (1939–2019)

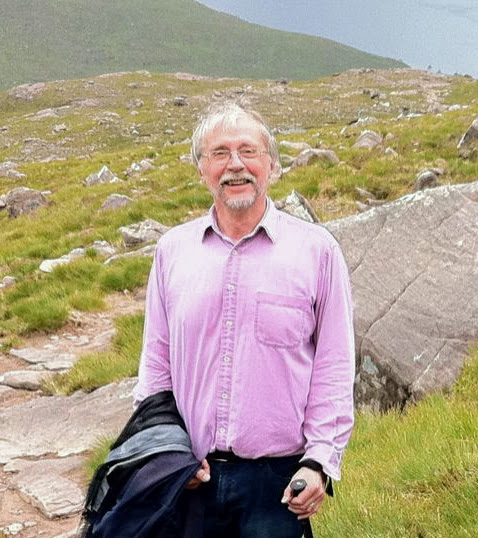
- Newman on Beinn Alligin in 2011
- Born: 21 May 1939; Comberton, near Cambridge, England
- Died: 11 June 2019 (aged 80); Cambridge, England
- Occupation: Computer scientist
- Known for: Contributions to computer graphics. Participation in work at the Xerox Palo Alto Research Center in the 1970s that led to the emergence of the personal computer.
- Spouse: Karmen Guevara (m. 1972) Anikó Anghi (m. 1994)
- Children: 2
- Parents: Max Newman (father); Lyn Irvine (mother)

William Maxwell Newman (21 May 1939 – 11 June 2019) was a British computer scientist. With others at the Xerox Palo Alto Research Center in the 1970s Newman demonstrated the advantages of the raster (bitmap graphics) display technology first deployed in the Xerox Alto personal workstation, developing interactive programs for producing illustrations and drawings. With Bob Sproull he co-authored the first major textbook on interactive computer graphics.

Newman later contributed to the field of human–computer interaction, publishing several papers and a book taking an engineering approach to the design of interactive systems. He was an honorary professor at University College London and taught at Harvard, Queen Mary College London, University of California, Irvine, the University of Utah, Technische Universität Darmstadt, and the University of Cambridge, and became an ACM SIGCHI Academy member in 2004.

== Early life ==
Newman was born 21 May 1939 at Comberton, near Cambridge, England. He was the second son of Max Newman, the distinguished mathematician and World War II codebreaker who worked at Bletchley Park, Manchester University and Cambridge University. William's mother was Lyn Irvine, a writer linked with the Bloomsbury Group.

For many years William was unaware of his father's important work at the Bletchley Park WWII codebreaking centre because it was protected under the Official Secrets Act until at least in the mid-1970s. Nevertheless, Alan Turing was a firm family friend, as was Albert Einstein, and a Monopoly board devised by William with Turing in 1950 was retrieved in 2011 following a visit to his family home with his son, daughter and future daughter-in-law, and later repackaged and sold by Bletchley Park.

In later life he took a keen interest in his father's role there, contributing items to the Bletchley Park Museum and elsewhere.

He also invested similar energy into his mother's creative output, collating and publishing letters between his mother and Lady Esher; these letters are available to view at St John's College, Cambridge, although she was an alumna of Girton College.

Growing up, the Newmans were very close family friends with the Penrose family, including Roger Penrose and Lionel Penrose; following his mother's death from cancer in 1973, his father married Margaret Penrose, Lionel Penrose's widow.

As his mother Lyn Irvine was raised in Aberdeen with family across the Scottish Borders, William spent much time in the Highlands and particularly in Torridon and Applecross.

== Education ==
He attended Manchester Grammar School before studying Architecture and Engineering at St John's College, Cambridge, obtaining a BA with first-class honours in 1961. His first contact with computers came in the mid-1960s when he joined others developing early CAD applications on the PDP-7 computer installed at the Cambridge Computer Laboratory. This PDP-7 was one of the first computers in the United Kingdom equipped with a vector-graphics display.

== Research and career ==
Newman completed a PhD in Computer Graphics at Imperial College London in 1968 under the supervision of Professor Bill Elliott. For his PhD project he produced the Reaction Handler, a system for organising the elements of a graphical user interface that is often referred to as the first user interface management system (UIMS). He then joined Ivan Sutherland's research team developing software for interactive computer graphics systems, first at Harvard and then the University of Utah. He then held teaching and research positions at Queen Mary College London, University of California, Irvine and the University of Utah.

Between 1973 and 1979, Newman worked at the Xerox Palo Alto Research Center (Xerox PARC) where he was involved in the development of several of the software components for the Alto, Xerox's pioneering personal computer. He independently developed Markup (1975), an early interactive drawing (paint) program. With Bob Sproull he developed Press, a page description language for printers that was a precursor to PostScript; and with Timothy Mott he developed Officetalk Zero, a prototype office system. All of them saw use in early versions of the Alto system. Markup included what was almost certainly the first instance of the use of pop-up menus. (Further details on Markup and Press can be found in the Alto User's Handbook).

In 1973, Newman and Bob Sproull published Principles of Interactive Computer Graphics; a second edition was published in 1979. This was the first comprehensive textbook on computer graphics and was regarded as the graphics "bible" until it was succeeded by Foley and van Dam's Computer Graphics: Principles and Practice.

Newman went on to manage a research team at the Xerox Research Centre Europe, Cambridge, UK. With Margery Eldridge and Mik Lamming he pursued a research project in Activity-Based Information Retrieval' (AIR). The basic hypothesis of the project was that if contextual data about human activities can be automatically captured and later presented as recognisable descriptions of past episodes, then human memory of those past episodes can be improved.

With his wife Karmen Guevara, he founded a company in 1986, Beta Chi Design, which was instrumental in introducing human-computer interaction and user-centred design practice to the UK, through workshops held across the UK, drawing on expertise gained while working with Xerox PARC.

Newman subsequently undertook research in human–computer interaction with the aim of identifying measurable parameters that characterise the quality of interaction. He developed an approach based on Critical Parameters for designing interactive systems that deliver tangible performance improvements to the user. In 1995 he published the textbook Interactive System Design with Mik Lamming incorporating those ideas.

After leaving Xerox, Newman worked as a consultant, advising a number of organisations on interactive systems design. He was also an honorary professor at University College London, lecturing at its Interaction Centre (UCLIC), at Cambridge University and at the Technische Universität Darmstadt.

== Personal life ==
While lecturing in computer science at University of California, Irvine, Newman met and married Karmen Guevara; they had two children, Damien Newman (1972) and Chantal Guevara (1975). The marriage ended in divorce. He subsequently married Anikó Anghi.

In 2009, William suffered from an arrythmic attack, triggering vascular dementia. He spent his later years in a care home on the outskirts of Cambridge.
