= Outcode =

Outcode may refer to:

- the first part of a UK postcode, short for “outward code”
- the region codes used in the Cohen-Sutherland clipping algorithm
