= Guard-band clipping =

Guard band clipping is a technique used by digital rendering hardware and software designed to minimize the amount of clipping performed. Instead of clipping polygons that extend out of the viewport, polygons are only clipped if they extend past a guard band. Clipping is still needed to prevent integer overflow in the rasterizer. The guard band is typically designed to be several orders of magnitude greater than the screen resolution, as clipping is an exception that creates a pipeline bubble and creates additional triangles to be processed.

== Sources ==
- Microsoft MSDN
- NVidia Development Portal
