= Brian A. Barsky =

Computer scientist (born 1954)

- Education: McGill University (BS); Cornell University (MS); University of Utah (PhD)
- Scientific career
- Workplaces: University of California, Berkeley
- Thesis: The Beta-spline: a local representation based on shape parameters and fundamental geometric measures (1981)
- Notable students: Jane P. Wilhelms, Tony D. DeRose, Mark A. Z. Dippe, Steven D. Upstill, Pauline Y. J. Ts'o, Paul S. Heckbert, Daniel D. Garcia, Mark A. Halstead, Fu-Chung Huang
- Website: people.eecs.berkeley.edu/~barsky/

Brian A. Barsky is Professor of the Graduate School at the University of California, Berkeley, working in computer graphics and geometric modeling as well as in optometry and vision science. He is Professor Emeritus of Computer Science and Vision Science and Affiliate Professor Emeritus of Optometry. He is also a member of the Joint Graduate Group in Bioengineering, an inter-campus program, between UC Berkeley and UC San Francisco and a Member of the Berkeley Emeriti Academy.

== Career ==
He is a UC Berkeley Presidential Chair Fellow, a Warren and Marjorie Minner Faculty Fellow in Engineering Ethics and Professional/Social Responsibility, and an ACM Distinguished Speaker.

Barsky was a visiting professor at Yale-NUS College in Singapore, in the Department of Computer Graphics and Multimedia in the Faculty of Information Technology at the Brno University of Technology in the Czech Republic, in the Machine Vision and Pattern Recognition Laboratory at the Lappeenranta University of Technology in Finland, at the Laboratoire d'Informatique Fondamentale de Lille (LIFL) of l'Université des Sciences et Technologies de Lille (USTL), at the Hong Kong University of Science and Technology in Hong Kong, at the University of Otago in Dunedin, New Zealand, in the Modélisation Géométrique et Infographie Interactive group at l'Institut de Recherche en Informatique de Nantes and l'Ecole Centrale de Nantes, in Nantes, at the University of Toronto, at the School of Computing at the National University of Singapore, at the Laboratoire Image of l'Ecole Nationale Supérieure des Télécommunications in Paris, and he was a visiting researcher with the Computer Aided Design and Manufacturing Group at the Sentralinsitutt for Industriell Forskning (Central Institute for Industrial Research) in Oslo.

== Education ==
Barsky holds a D.C.S. in engineering and a B.Sc. in mathematics and computer science from McGill University in Montreal, an M.S. in computer graphics and computer science from Cornell University in Ithaca, and a Ph.D. in computer science from the University of Utah in Salt Lake City.

== Awards ==
Barsky won an IBM Faculty Development Award and a National Science Foundation Presidential Young Investigator Award. He was named a Fellow of the American Academy of Optometry (F.A.A.O.)

== Books ==
He is a co-author or author of several books: An Introduction to Splines for Use in Computer Graphics and Geometric Modeling, Making Them Move: Mechanics, Control, and Animation of Articulated Figures, and Computer Graphics and Geometric Modeling Using Beta-splines. See List of books in computational geometry.

== Conference Program Chairs ==
He was the Technical Program Committee Chair for the ACM SIGGRAPH '85 conference held in San Francisco on July 22–26, 1985 and Program Co-chair of Pacific Graphics 2000 held in Hong Kong on October 3–5, 2000.

== Research ==
Along with You-Dong Liang, he was an author and namesake of the “Liang-Barsky algorithm” for clipping in computer graphics.

Barsky created the Beta-spline curve and surface representation which introduced the concept of geometric continuity for smoothness and G^{n} notation to the fields of computer-aided geometric design and geometric modeling.

He introduced vision-realistic rendering to simulate human vision based on ocular measurements of an individual. Using these measurements, synthetics images are generated. This process modifies input images to simulate the appearance of the scene for the individual.

That work led to an investigation with Fu-Chung Huang of how to display images to compensate for the specific optical aberrations of the viewer, resulting in vision-correcting displays. Given the measurements of the optical aberrations of a user’s eye, a vision correcting display produces a transformed image that when viewed by this individual will appear in sharp focus. This could impact computer monitors, laptops, tablets, and mobile phones. Vision correction could be provided in some cases where eyeglasses are ineffective. This research was selected by Scientific American as one of 2014's ten annual "World Changing Ideas.”

Barsky developed a contact lens design to help restore vision to people with cornea problems.
