= Nicholl–Lee–Nicholl algorithm =

Line-clipping algorithm in computer graphics

In computer graphics, the Nicholl–Lee–Nicholl algorithm is a fast algorithm for line clipping that reduces the chances of clipping a single line segment multiple times, as may happen in the Cohen–Sutherland algorithm.

== Description ==
Using the Nicholl–Lee–Nicholl algorithm, the area around the clipping window is divided into a number of different areas, depending on the position of the initial point of the line to be clipped. This initial point should be in three predetermined areas; thus the line may have to be translated and/or rotated to bring it into the desired region. The line segment may then be re-translated and/or re-rotated to bring it to the original position. After that, straight line segments are drawn from the line end point, passing through the corners of the clipping window. These areas are then designated as L, LT, LB, or TR, depending on the location of the initial point. Then the other end point of the line is checked against these areas. If a line starts in the L area and finishes in the LT area then the algorithm concludes that the line should be clipped at xw (max). Thus the number of clipping points is reduced to one, compared to other algorithms that may require two or more clipping

== See also ==
Algorithms used for the same purpose:

- Liang–Barsky algorithm
- Cyrus–Beck algorithm
- Fast clipping
