= Danny Cohen (computer scientist) =

American computer scientist

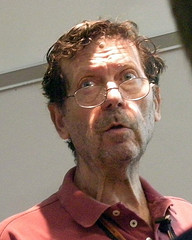
- Danny Cohen in 2009
- Born: December 9, 1937; Haifa, Mandatory Palestine
- Died: August 12, 2019 (aged 81); Palo Alto, California, U.S.
- Other name: James A. Finnegan.
- Education: Technion, Harvard
- Known for: Endianness, Being an Internet pioneer, first to run a visual flight simulator across the ARPANet
- Awards: National Academy of Engineering member, IEEE Fellow, USAF Meritorious Civilian Service Award
- Scientific career
- Fields: Mathematics, Computer Science, Computer Graphics
- Workplaces: Harvard University, California Institute of Technology, University of Southern California, Myricom, Sun Microsystems
- Doctoral advisor: Ivan E. Sutherland

Danny Cohen (December 9, 1937 – August 12, 2019) was an Israeli-American computer scientist specializing in computer networking. He was involved in the ARPAnet project and helped develop various fundamental applications for the Internet. He was one of the key figures behind the separation of TCP and IP (early versions of TCP did not have a separate IP layer); this allowed the later creation of UDP.

Cohen is probably now best known for his 1980 paper "On Holy Wars and a Plea for Peace" which adopted the terminology of endianness for computing (a term borrowed from Jonathan Swift's Gulliver's Travels). Cohen served on the computer science faculty at several universities and worked in private industry.

== Biography ==
Cohen earned a bachelor's degree in mathematics at the Technion – Israel Institute of Technology in 1963. He was a graduate student in the math department at the Massachusetts Institute of Technology (MIT) from 1965 to 1967.

In 1967, Cohen developed the first real-time visual flight simulator on a general purpose computer and the first real-time radar simulator. Cohen's flight simulation work led to the development of the Cohen-Sutherland computer graphics line clipping algorithms, created with Ivan Sutherland at Harvard University. He received a Ph.D. from Harvard in 1969 as a student of Sutherland. His thesis was titled: "Incremental Methods for Computer Graphics".

After serving on the computer science faculty at Harvard through 1973, and at California Institute of Technology in 1976, Cohen joined the Information Sciences Institute at the University of Southern California to work on a packet-voice project designed to allow interactive, real-time speech over the ARPANet (and the Internet during its early development). The Network Voice Protocol project was a forerunner of Voice over Internet Protocol (VoIP). In 1981, he adapted the visual simulator to run over the ARPANet which was an early application of packet switching networks to real-time applications. He started the MOSIS project in 1980.

In 1993, he worked on Distributed Interactive Simulation through several projects funded by the United States Department of Defense (DoD). He prototyped a local area network technology called ATOMIC, which was the forerunner of Myrinet. In 1994, Cohen co-founded Myricom (with Chuck Seitz, and others) which commercialized Myrinet. Cohen also started the FastXchange project for electronic commerce and a digital library.

Cohen served on several panels and boards for the US DoD, National Institutes of Health, and United States National Research Council, including 5 years on the USAF Scientific Advisory Board. He served as both a factual and expert witness in patent infringement legal cases about VoIP. Cohen was a commercial pilot with SEL/MEL/SES and Instrument ratings.

In 1993 Cohen received the Meritorious Civilian Service Award from the United States Air Force. He was a member of the National Academy of Engineering (2006) and an IEEE Fellow (2010).

Since 2001, Cohen was a distinguished engineer for Sun Microsystems working on fast communication over short distances using optical and electrical signaling, in Sun's chief technical officer organization.

Cohen continued as an adjunct professor of computer science at USC.

In 2012, Cohen was inducted into the Internet Hall of Fame by the Internet Society. In 2013 Vint Cerf hosted an event at Google honoring Cohen.

Danny Cohen died in Palo Alto, California on August 12, 2019, at the age of 81.

== Selected publications ==
- Danny Cohen (1980-04-01). "On Holy Wars and a Plea for Peace". Internet Experiment Note 137. — also published in IEEE Computer, October 1981 issue.
- "AI as the Ultimate Enhancer of Protocol design" (with J. Finnegan), Artificial Intelligence and Software Engineering, Ed. Derek Partridge, ABLEX Publishing Corporation, Norwood, NJ. ISBN 0-89391-606-4, 1991, Chapter 22, pp. 463–472, and also in the Proceedings of the Third Annual Artificial Intelligence and Advanced Computer Technology Conference, Long Beach, CA, April 1987, pp. 329–337. Available online at .
- "Protocols for Dating Coordination" (with Y. Yemini), Proceedings of the Fourth Berkeley Conference on Distributed Data Management and Computer Networks, San Francisco, CA, August 1979, pp. 179–188.
- "Incremental Methods for Computer Graphics" (PhD Thesis), Harvard Report ESD-TR-69-193, April 1969. Available from DTIC (AD #AD694550/U).
- "On Linear Differences Curves", published as a chapter in the book Advanced Computer Graphics, Economics, Techniques and Applications, edited by Parslow and Green, Pleunum Press, London 1971, and also in Proceedings of the Computer Graphics '70 Conference, Brunel University, England, April 1970.
- "RFC 0741: Specifications for the Network Voice Protocol (NVP)", Nov-22-1977.
- "A VLSI Approach to Computational Complexity" by Professor J. Finnegan, in VLSI, Systems and Computation, edited by H. T. Kung, Bob Sproull, and Guy L. Steele Jr., Computer Science Press, 1981, pp. 124–125.
- "A Voice Message System", in Computer Message Systems edited by R. P. Uhlig, North-Holland 1981, pp. 17–28.
- "The ISO Reference Model and Other Protocol Architectures" (with J. B. Postel), in International Federation for Information Processing 1983, Paris, September 1983, pp. 29–34.
- "MOSIS: Present and Future" (with G. Lewicki, P. Losleben, and D. Trotter) 1984 Conference on Advanced Research in VLSI, Massachusetts Institute of Technology, January 1984, pp. 124–128.
- "A Mathematical Approach to Computational Network Design", Chapter 1 in Systolic Signal Processing Systems (E. E. Swartzlander, ed.), Marcel Dekker, 1987, pp. 1–29.
- "Computerized Commerce", International Federation for Information Processing 1989, San Francisco, August 1989, pp. 1095–1100.
- "Myrinet: A Gigabit-per-Second Local Area Network" (with Boden, Felderman, Kulawik, Seitz, Seizovic, and Su), IEEE-MICRO, February 1995, pp. 29–36.
- "RFC 1807: A Format for Bibliographic Records" (with R. Lasher), IETF, June 1995.
- "The Internet of Things" (with N. Gershenfeld and R. Krikorian), Scientific American, October 2004, pp. 76–81.
- "Internet-0: Interdevice Internetworking" (with N. Gershenfeld), IEEE Circuits and Devices Magazine, September/October 2006, Vol:22, Issue:5, pp. 48–55
- "The world according to Professor James A Finnegan" A collection of entertaining essays about computers, life, the universe, and everything else. By Danny Cohen. Edited by Ron Ho. April 2014, ISBN 978-1495220852

== Patents ==
- US Patent 7,573,720 (2009) Active socket for facilitating proximity communication
- US Patent 7,561,584 (2009) Implementation of a graph property in a switching fabric for fast networking
- US Patent 7,525,199 (2009) Packaging for proximity communication positioned integrated circuits
- US Patent 7,460,035 (2008) Balanced code with opportunistically reduced transitions
- US Patent 3,769,442 (1973) Compressed Data Base for Radar Land Mass Simulator
