= Line clipping =

In computer graphics, removal of lines outside the view area/volume

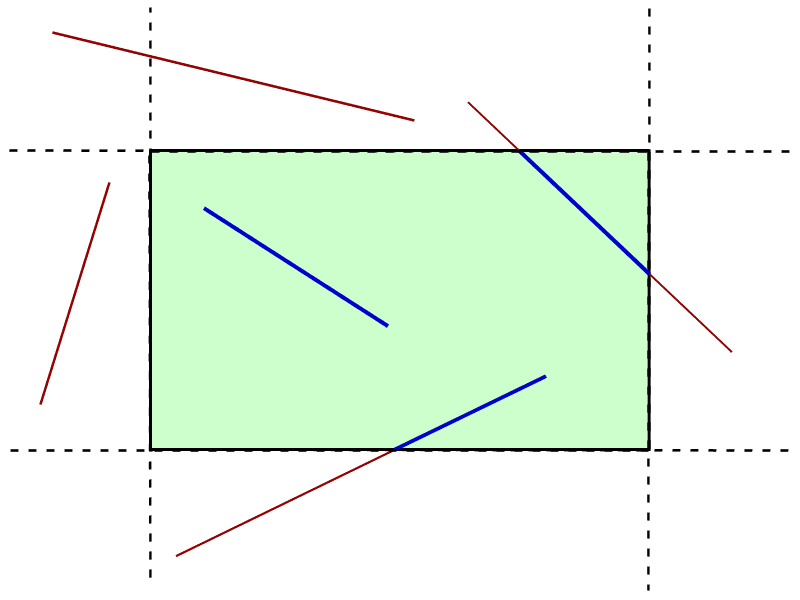
Example of line clipping for a two-dimensional region

In computer graphics, line clipping is the process of removing (clipping) lines or portions of lines outside an area of interest (a viewport or view volume). Typically, any part of a line which is outside of the viewing area is removed.

There are two common algorithms for line clipping: Cohen–Sutherland and Liang–Barsky.

A line-clipping method consists of various parts. Tests are conducted on a given line segment to find out whether it lies outside the view area or volume. Then, intersection calculations are carried out with one or more clipping boundaries. Determining which portion of the line is inside or outside of the clipping volume is done by processing the endpoints of the line with regard to the intersection.

== Cohen–Sutherland ==
In computer graphics, the Cohen–Sutherland algorithm (named after Danny Cohen and Ivan Sutherland) is a line-clipping algorithm. The algorithm divides a 2D space into 9 regions, of which only the middle part (viewport) is visible.

In 1967, flight-simulation work by Danny Cohen led to the development of the Cohen–Sutherland computer graphics two-dimensional and three-dimensional line clipping algorithms, created with Ivan Sutherland.

== Liang–Barsky ==
The Liang–Barsky algorithm uses the parametric equation of a line and inequalities describing the range of the clipping box to determine the intersections between the line and the clipping box. With these intersections it knows which portion of the line should be drawn. This algorithm is significantly more efficient than Cohen–Sutherland, but Cohen–Sutherland does trivial accepts and rejects much faster, so it should be considered instead if most of the lines you need to clip would be completely in or out of the clip window.

== Cyrus–Beck ==
Very similar to Liang–Barsky line-clipping algorithm. The difference is that Liang–Barsky is a simplified Cyrus–Beck variation that was optimized for a rectangular clip window.

The Cyrus–Beck algorithm is primarily intended for clipping a line in the parametric form against a convex polygon in 2 dimensions or against a convex polyhedron in 3 dimensions.

== Nicholl–Lee–Nicholl ==
The Nicholl–Lee–Nicholl algorithm is a fast line-clipping algorithm that reduces the chances of clipping a single line segment multiple times, as may happen in the Cohen–Sutherland algorithm. The clipping window is divided into a number of different areas, depending on the position of the initial point of the line to be clipped.

== Fast clipping ==
This algorithm has similarities with Cohen–Sutherland. The start and end positions are classified by which portion of the 9-area grid they occupy. A large switch statement jumps to a specialized handler for that case. In contrast, Cohen–Sutherland may have to iterate several times to handle the same case.

== O(lg N) algorithm ==
This algorithm classifies vertices against the given line in the implicit form p: ax + by + c = 0. As the polygon is assumed to be convex and vertices are ordered clockwise or anti-clockwise, binary search can be applied and leads to a O(lg N) run-time complexity.

== Skala ==
This algorithm is based on homogeneous coordinates and duality. It can be used for line or line-segment clipping against a rectangular window, as well as against a convex polygon. The algorithm is based on classifying a vertex of the clipping window against a half-space given by a line p: ax + by + c = 0. The result of the classification determines the edges intersected by the line p. The algorithm is simple, easy to implement and extensible to a convex window as well. The line or line segment p can be computed from points r_{1}, r_{2} given in homogeneous coordinates directly using the cross product as

p = r_{1} × r_{2} = (x_{1}, y_{1}, w_{1}) × (x_{2}, y_{2}, w_{2})

or as

p = r_{1} × r_{2} = (x_{1}, y_{1}, 1) × (x_{2}, y_{2}, 1).

== See also ==
- Clipping (computer graphics)
