= Sze-Tsen Hu =

Chinese-American mathematician

- 胡世楨
- Born: 9 October 1914; Huzhou, Zhejiang, China
- Died: 6 May 1999 (aged 84)
- Other name: Steve Hu
- Education: National Central University; University of Manchester
- Occupation: Mathematician
- Scientific career
- Fields: Homotopy theory
- Workplaces: UCLA; Wayne State University; University of Georgia; Tulane University; Institute for Advanced Study
- Doctoral advisor: Max Newman

Sze-Tsen Hu (Chinese: 胡世楨; pinyin: Hú Shìzhēn; Wade–Giles: Hu Shih-chen; 9 October 1914 – 6 May 1999), also known as Steve Hu, was a Chinese-American mathematician, specializing in homotopy theory.

Hu received his B.S. from the National Central University in Nanking, China in 1938 and his Ph.D. from the University of Manchester, England in 1947 with thesis advisor Max Newman.

Hu held a visiting lectureship at Tulane University for 1949–1950 and was a visiting scholar from 1950 to 1952 at the Institute for Advanced Study. He was an associate professor at Tulane University in 1952–1955, a professor in 1955–1956 at the University of Georgia, and from 1956 to the end of 1959 a professor at Wayne State University in Detroit, Michigan. In January 1960 he became a professor at UCLA, where he remained until his retirement as professor emeritus in 1982. He was an invited speaker at the International Congress of Mathematicians in 1950 at Cambridge, Massachusetts.

He was elected in 1966 to the Academica Sinica (Taiwan). He was survived by his second wife, his son, and his daughter.

== Selected works ==
=== Articles ===
- Hu, Sze-Tsen (January 1949). "Extension and classification of the mappings of a finite complex into a topological group or an n-sphere". Annals of Mathematics. 50 (1): 158–173. doi:10.2307/1969359. JSTOR 1969359.
- Hu, Sze-Tsen (1950). "On generalising the notion of fibre spaces to include the fibre bundles". Proc. Amer. Math. Soc. 1 (6): 756–762. doi:10.1090/s0002-9939-1950-0038657-8. MR 0038657.
- Hu, Sze-Tsen (1951). "The equivalence of fiber bundles". Annals of Mathematics. 53 (2): 256–275. doi:10.2307/1969542. JSTOR 1969542.
- Hu, Sze-Tsen (1952). "On local structure of finite–dimensional groups". Trans. Amer. Math. Soc. 73 (3): 383–400. doi:10.1090/s0002-9947-1952-0053118-4. MR 0053118.
- Hu, Sze-Tsen (July 1953). "The homotopy addition theorem". Annals of Mathematics. 58 (1): 108–122. doi:10.2307/1969822. JSTOR 1969822.
- Hu, Sze-Tsen (1956). "Axiomatic approach to the homotopy groups". Bull. Amer. Math. Soc. 62 (5): 490–504. doi:10.1090/s0002-9904-1956-10038-4. MR 0080304.

=== Books ===
- Introduction to Homological Algebra. San Francisco: Holden Day. 1968.
- Homotopy theory. Academic Press. 1959. ISBN 9780123584502.
- Threshold Logic. University of California Press. 1965. ISBN 9780262040099.
- Introduction to General Topology. San Francisco: Holden Day. 1966.
- Homology theory. San Francisco: Holden Day. 1966.
- Cohomology theory. Chicago: Markham. 1968.
- Mathematical Theory of Switching Circuits and Automata. University of California Press. 1968.
- Differentiable Manifolds. New York: Holt, Rinehart and Winston. 1969.
