= Bert Sutherland =

American computer scientist (1936–2020)

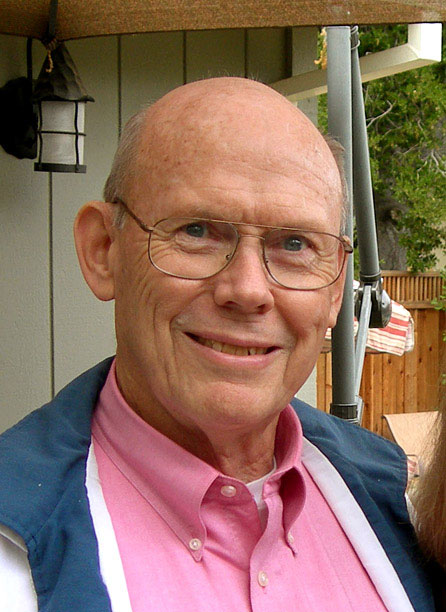
- Born: William Robert Sutherland; May 10, 1936; Hastings, Nebraska, United States
- Died: February 18, 2020 (aged 83); Mountain View, California, U.S.
- Education: RPI; MIT
- Known for: Computer research management, Computer graphics
- Awards: Legion of Merit
- Scientific career
- Fields: Electrical engineering; Computer science; Internet; Management
- Workplaces: United States Navy; BBN Technologies; Xerox PARC; Sun Microsystems
- Doctoral advisor: Claude Shannon

William Robert Sutherland (May 10, 1936 – February 18, 2020) was an American computer scientist who was the longtime manager of three prominent research laboratories, including Sun Microsystems Laboratories (1992–1998), the Systems Science Laboratory at Xerox PARC (1975–1981), and the Computer Science Division of Bolt, Beranek and Newman, Inc. which helped develop the ARPANET.

In these roles, Sutherland participated in creating the personal computer, the technology of advanced microprocessors, two programming languages (Smalltalk, Java), and the Internet.

Unlike traditional corporate research managers, Sutherland added individuals from fields like psychology, cognitive science, and anthropology to enhance the work of his technology staff. He also directed his scientists to take their research, like the Xerox Alto "personal" computer, outside of the laboratory to allow people to use it in a corporate setting and to observe their interaction with it.

In addition, Sutherland fostered a collaboration between California Institute of Technology researchers developing methods of very-large-scale integration (VLSI) for integrated circuits, namely Ivan Sutherland (Bert's brother) and Carver Mead, and with PARC staff member Lynn Conway. With PARC resources made available by Sutherland, Mead and Conway developed a textbook and university syllabus that helped expedite the development and distribution of a technology with an effect now immeasurable.

Sutherland said that a research lab is primarily a teaching institution, "teaching whatever is new so that the new can become familiar, old, and used widely."

Sutherland was born in Hastings, Nebraska, on May 10, 1936, to a father from New Zealand; his mother was from Scotland. The family moved to Wilmette, Illinois, then Scarsdale, New York, for his father's career. Bert Sutherland graduated from Scarsdale High School, then received his bachelor's degree in electrical engineering from Rensselaer Polytechnic Institute (RPI), and his master's degree and Ph.D. from Massachusetts Institute of Technology (MIT); his thesis advisor was Claude Shannon. During his military service in the United States Navy, he was awarded the Legion of Merit as a Carrier ASW plane commander. He was the older brother of Ivan Sutherland. Sutherland died on February 18, 2020, aged 83.
