= Lyn Irvine =

British literary journalist (1901–1973)

Lyn Lloyd Newman
- Born: Lyn Lloyd Irvine; 3 May 1901; Berwick-upon-Tweed, Northumberland, England
- Died: 19 May 1973 (aged 71)

Lyn Lloyd Newman (née Irvine; 3 May 1901 – 19 May 1973) was a literary journalist and writer.

== Biography ==
She was born in Berwick-upon-Tweed, the daughter of John A. Irvine, a Presbyterian minister, and his Irish wife Lilian; Andrew Irvine, who died on Mount Everest in 1924, was her first cousin. After studying at the University of Aberdeen and Girton College, Cambridge, she moved to London and published poems and reviews. Some of these were published by Leonard Woolf, then literary editor of the Nation and Athenaeum, with whom Lyn formed a long friendship.

In 1931, the Hogarth Press published her first book, Ten Letter Writers, increasing her recognition within the Bloomsbury Group and beyond. In 1934, she started a literary subscription journal, The Monologue, which she very largely wrote, printed and published herself. Subscribers included Clive and Julian Bell, Elizabeth Bowen, Graham Greene, Maynard Keynes, Vita Sackville-West, and Leonard and Virginia Woolf, Irvine ended the journal in February 1935.

In 1934, Irvine married the Cambridge mathematician Max Newman; they had two sons, Edward (born 1935) and William, later a computer scientist (1939). They bought Cross Farm, in the village of Comberton five miles from the city, as a family house, and Lyn considered this home for the rest of her life. When Max visited Princeton University in 1937, Lyn and the infant Edward accompanied him there for six months; in 1940, she evacuated with both sons to the US while Max remained in Cambridge. After Max had started working at Bletchley Park, they returned to live with him, and then moved with Max when he became Professor of Mathematics at the University of Manchester in 1945. It was Max who was instrumental in bringing Alan Turing to Manchester. Turing at first lived near to the Newmans and Max and Lyn both became close friends; only Lyn joined Turing's mother and brother at his funeral. She never enjoyed Manchester and returned permanently to Cross Farm in 1952 while Max remained in Manchester during term-times.

Lyn published three more books under her maiden name. The first was a memoir of her childhood, followed by a piece of nature writing based on her life at Cross Farm. She formed Monologue Books to market these and to self-publish a memoir of her friend Alison Cairns. She also wrote a foreword to Sara Turing's biography of her son Alan. The dovecote of Cross Farm was converted for her and from there she maintained prolific correspondences with friends and family.

== Works ==
- Ten Letter Writers (1931)
- The Monologue (1934–1935)
- So Much Love So Little Money (1957) autobiography
- Field With Geese (1960)
- Alison Cairns and Her Family (1967)

== Archives ==
St. John's College, Cambridge has an archive of Lyn Newman's papers.
