= You-Dong Liang =

Mathematician and educator

You-Dong Liang (梁友栋) is a mathematician and educator, best known for his contributions in geometric modeling and the Liang-Barsky algorithm.

== Education and teaching ==
You-Dong Liang was born on July 19, 1935, in Fuzhou, Fujian Province, China. Liang pursued his graduate degree in Fudan University, where he worked under the supervision of Professor Su Buqing and specialized in geometric theory. After graduating in 1960, he joined the mathematics teaching faculty at Zhejiang University, where he actively promoted the development of geometric design and graphics. From 1984–1990, he was the chairman of the mathematics department, and on several occasions, was a visiting scholar and visiting professor at the University of California at Berkeley, University of Utah, and University of Berlin. Liang helped form the Computational Geometry Collaborative Group in China. As the leader of this group, Liang supported the collaboration of scholars in geometric design and computational graphics. Liang was awarded the “Chinese Geometric Design and Calculation Contribution Award” in 2009.

== Contributions, papers, and awards ==
Liang has worked on computer-aided geometric design and computer graphics research. In 1984, Liang developed the Liang–Barsky algorithm, which has applications in computer graphics. Liang made further improvements on this algorithm in 1992. In the late 1980s and early 1990s, Liang proposed a series of theories and methodologies in geometric continuity. In 1991, Liang supervised the completion of "Generated Computer Graphics and Geometric Modeling Research" and was awarded the Chinese National Science Third Prize. During these years, Liang received other honors, including the Chinese Academy of Sciences Award and the “European Graphics Conference” Best Paper Award. Liang has published more than 50 papers, including "A New Concept and Method for Line Clipping", "Some Theorems on Geometrical Objects", "Curve and Surface Geometry Continuity", and "An Analysis and Algorithm for Polygon Clipping."
