= Comberton =

Village and civil parish in South Cambridgeshire, England

Coordinates: 52.1876°N 0.0240°E

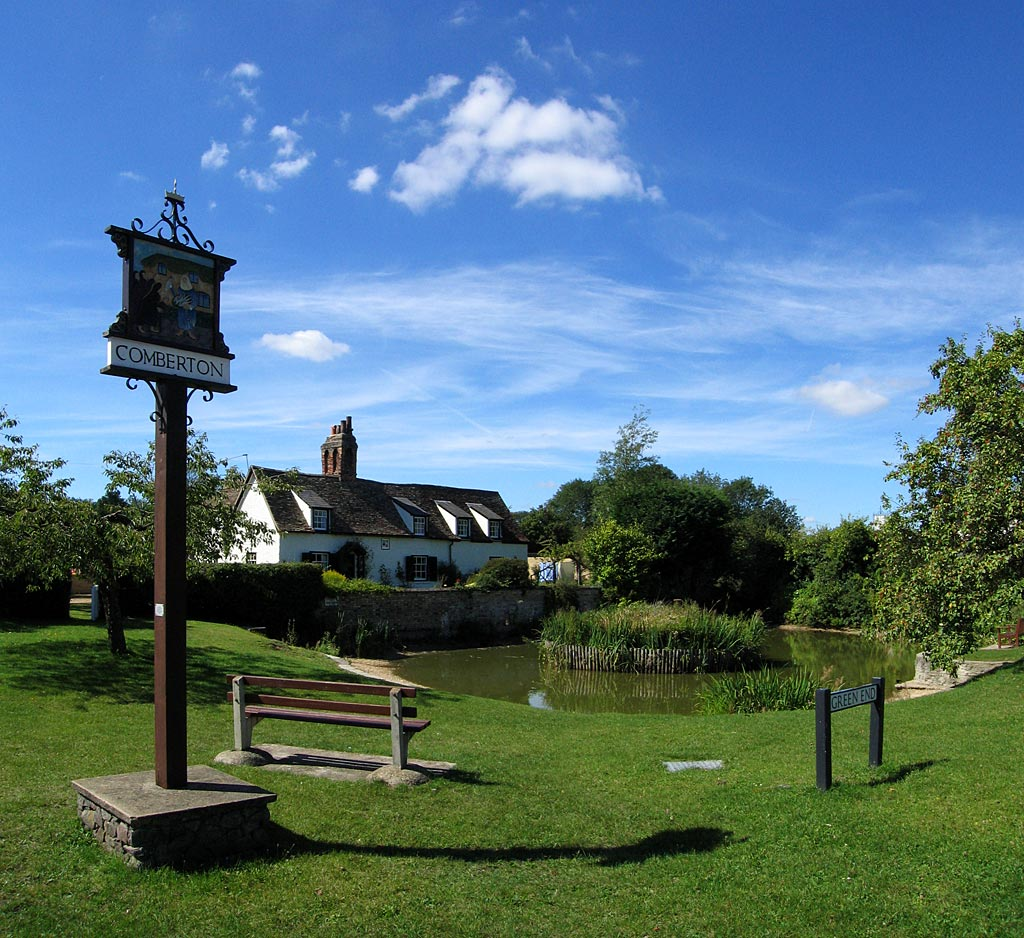
- Comberton village green and pond

- Location within Cambridgeshire
- Population: 2,346 (2011 Census)
- OS grid reference: TL383563
- District: South Cambridgeshire
- Shire county: Cambridgeshire
- Region: East
- Country: England
- Sovereign state: United Kingdom
- Post town: CAMBRIDGE
- Postcode district: CB23
- Dialling code: 01223
- Police: Cambridgeshire
- Fire: Cambridgeshire
- Ambulance: East of England
- UK Parliament: South Cambridgeshire

Comberton is a village and civil parish in South Cambridgeshire, England, a few miles south-west of Cambridge.

== Toponymy ==
The village's name is often derived from "Cumbre" + "-tun", where "Cumbre" generically means Briton(the Cymru), and -tun is an Old English suffix meaning enclosure or farmstead. The Domesday Book (1086) has it recorded as Cumbertone. According to William Kip’s map of the area in 1607 Comberton is spelt as it is today (2025).

== History ==
Archaeological finds, including a Neolithic polished stone axe (found to the south of the current village) and a Bronze Age barrow (to the north), suggest there has been a settlement here for thousands of years. A Roman villa was discovered in 1842. In a hypothesis, the Roman villa has been associated with the tenth-century Battle of Brunanburh.The village was mentioned in Domesday Book of 1086 as Cumbertone, and therefore dates to at least the 11th century. Some of the present houses in the village date from the 14th century.

== Geography ==
Comberton is about 5 miles (8.0 km) south-west of the city of Cambridge, and just 1/2-mile (0.80 km) east of the Greenwich Prime Meridian, lying at a height above mean sea level of around 25 feet (7.6 m). The civil parish covers 1,954 acres (790.8 ha), and is part of the local government district of South Cambridgeshire. Nearby villages include Barton to the east and Toft to the west. Comberton is twinned with Le Vaudreuil, a village near Rouen, France. The Prime Meridian is marked by a stone plaque on the north side of the main road (B1046) between Comberton and the neighbouring village of Toft.

== Community ==
Comberton has a population of about 2,300, down from 2,400 in 2011. It has a pub, The Three Horseshoes, a Co-Op, a post office, a recreation ground, a doctor's surgery, a dentist's surgery, a coffee shop, and two churches: the Church of England St Mary's, a Grade I listed Early English-style building dating from the 13th century, and a Baptist church dating from 1868. The village has a playgroup, a nursery, the Meridian Primary School, Comberton Village College, and the Comberton Sixth Form. The latter two are part of the Cam Academy Trust.

The four corners of the crossroads at the village centre house the village pond with resident ducks, Comberton Playgroup, a large farm house, Cross Farm, and the former village store, now a dental surgery.

From the 1930s onward, Cross Farm was home to the literary journalist and writer Lyn Irvine and her husband, Cambridge mathematician Max Newman. The hamlet of Green End, just north of the crossroads, was named after the landowner Sir Henry Green (d.1370), Chief Justice of the King's Bench 1361–1365. The current Manor House at Green End dates back to the late 16th century.

== See also ==
- List of places in Cambridgeshire
