= Cyrus–Beck algorithm =

Line-clipping algorithm in computer graphics

Cyrus–Beck algorithm

In computer graphics, the Cyrus–Beck algorithm is a generalized algorithm for line clipping. It was designed to be more efficient than the Cohen–Sutherland algorithm, which uses repetitive clipping. Cyrus–Beck is a general algorithm and can be used with a convex polygon clipping window, unlike Cohen-Sutherland, which can be used only on a rectangular clipping area.

Here the parametric equation of a line in the view plane is
$$\mathbf p(t) = t \mathbf p_1 + (1 - t) \mathbf p_0$$
where $0 \leq t \leq 1$.

Now to find the intersection point with the clipping window, we calculate the value of the dot product. Let $\mathbf{p}_E$ be a point on the clipping plane $E$.

Calculate $\mathbf n \cdot (\mathbf p(t) - \mathbf p_E)$:

- if < 0, vector pointed towards interior;
- if = 0, vector pointed parallel to plane containing $p$;
- if > 0, vector pointed away from interior.

Here $\bold n$ stands for normal of the current clipping plane (pointed away from interior).

By this we select the point of intersection of line and clipping window where (dot product is 0) and hence clip the line.

== See also ==
Algorithms used for the same purpose:

- Cohen–Sutherland algorithm
- Liang–Barsky algorithm
- Nicholl–Lee–Nicholl algorithm
- Fast clipping

References in other media:

- Tron: Uprising
