= Liang–Barsky algorithm =

Line-clipping algorithm

In computer graphics, the Liang–Barsky algorithm (named after You-Dong Liang and Brian A. Barsky) is a line clipping algorithm first published in early 1984. The Liang–Barsky algorithm uses the parametric equation of a line and inequalities describing the range of the clipping window to determine the intersections between the line and the clip window. With these intersections, it knows which portion of the line should be drawn. So this algorithm is significantly more efficient than Cohen–Sutherland. The idea of the Liang–Barsky clipping algorithm is to do as much testing as possible before computing line intersections.

The algorithm uses the parametric form of a straight line:

$$x = x_0 + t (x_1 - x_0) = x_0 + t \Delta x,$$
$$y = y_0 + t (y_1 - y_0) = y_0 + t \Delta y.$$

A point is in the clip window, if
$$x_\text{min} \le x_0 + t \Delta x \le x_\text{max}$$
and
$$y_\text{min} \le y_0 + t \Delta y \le y_\text{max},$$
which can be expressed as the 4 inequalities
$$t p_i \le q_i, \quad i = 1, 2, 3, 4,$$
where

$$\begin{align}
p_1 &= -\Delta x, & q_1 &= x_0 - x_\text{min}, & &\text{(left)} \\
p_2 &=  \Delta x, & q_2 &= x_\text{max} - x_0, & &\text{(right)} \\
p_3 &= -\Delta y, & q_3 &= y_0 - y_\text{min}, & &\text{(bottom)} \\
p_4 &=  \Delta y, & q_4 &= y_\text{max} - y_0. & &\text{(top)}
\end{align}$$

To compute the final line segment:

1. A line parallel to a clipping window edge has $p_i = 0$ for that boundary.
2. If for that $i$, $q_i < 0$, then the line is completely outside and can be eliminated.
3. When $p_i < 0$, the line proceeds outside to inside the clip window, and when $p_i > 0$, the line proceeds inside to outside.
4. For nonzero $p_i$, $u = q_i / p_i$ gives $t$ for the intersection point of the line and the window edge (possibly projected).
5. The two actual intersections of the line with the window edges, if they exist, are described by $u_1$ and $u_2$, calculated as follows. For $u_1$, look at boundaries for which $p_i < 0$ (i.e. outside to inside). Take $u_1$ to be the largest among $\{0, q_i / p_i\}$. For $u_2$, look at boundaries for which $p_i > 0$ (i.e. inside to outside). Take $u_2$ to be the minimum of $\{1, q_i / p_i\}$.
6. If $u_1 > u_2$, the line is entirely outside the clip window. If $u_1 < 0 < 1 < u_2$ it is entirely inside it.

// Liang–Barsky line-clipping algorithm
#include<iostream>
#include<graphics.h>
#include<math.h>

using namespace std;

// this function gives the maximum
float maxi(float arr[], int n) {
  float m = 0;
  for (int i = 0; i < n; ++i)
    if (m < arr[i])
      m = arr[i];
  return m;
}

// this function gives the minimum
float mini(float arr[], int n) {
  float m = 1;
  for (int i = 0; i < n; ++i)
    if (m > arr[i])
      m = arr[i];
  return m;
}

void liang_barsky_clipper(float xmin, float ymin, float xmax, float ymax,
                          float x1, float y1, float x2, float y2) {
  // defining variables
  float p1 = -(x2 - x1);
  float p2 = -p1;
  float p3 = -(y2 - y1);
  float p4 = -p3;

  float q1 = x1 - xmin;
  float q2 = xmax - x1;
  float q3 = y1 - ymin;
  float q4 = ymax - y1;

  float exitParams[5], entryParams[5];
  int exitIndex = 1, entryIndex = 1;
  exitParams[0] = 1;
  entryParams[0] = 0;

  rectangle(xmin, ymin, xmax, ymax); // drawing the clipping window

  if ((p1 == 0 && q1 < 0) || (p2 == 0 && q2 < 0) || (p3 == 0 && q3 < 0) || (p4 == 0 && q4 < 0)) {
      outtextxy(80, 80, "Line is parallel to clipping window!");
      return;
  }
  if (p1 != 0) {
    float r1 = q1 / p1;
    float r2 = q2 / p2;
    if (p1 < 0) {
      entryParams[entryIndex++] = r1;
      exitParams[exitIndex++] = r2;
    } else {
      entryParams[entryIndex++] = r2;
      exitParams[exitIndex++] = r1;
    }
  }
  if (p3 != 0) {
    float r3 = q3 / p3;
    float r4 = q4 / p4;
    if (p3 < 0) {
      entryParams[entryIndex++] = r3;
      exitParams[exitIndex++] = r4;
    } else {
      entryParams[entryIndex++] = r4;
      exitParams[exitIndex++] = r3;
    }
  }

  float clippedX1, clippedY1, clippedX2, clippedY2;
  float u1, u2;
  u1 = maxi(entryParams, entryIndex); // maximum of entry points
  u2 = mini(exitParams, exitIndex);   // minimum of exit points

  if (u1 > u2) {
    outtextxy(80, 80, "Line is outside the clipping window!");
    return;
  }

  clippedX1 = x1 + (x2 - x1) * u1;
  clippedY1 = y1 + (y2 - y1) * u1;
  clippedX2 = x1 + (x2 - x1) * u2;
  clippedY2 = y1 + (y2 - y1) * u2;

  setcolor(CYAN);
  line(clippedX1, clippedY1, clippedX2, clippedY2); // draw clipped segment

  setlinestyle(1, 1, 0);
  line(x1, y1, clippedX1, clippedY1); // original start to clipped start
  line(x2, y2, clippedX2, clippedY2); // original end to clipped end
}

int main() {
  cout << "\nLiang-Barsky Line Clipping";
  cout << "\nThe system window layout is: (0,0) at bottom left and (631, 467) at top right";
  cout << "\nEnter the coordinates of the window (xmin, ymin, xmax, ymax): ";
  float xmin, ymin, xmax, ymax;
  cin >> xmin >> ymin >> xmax >> ymax;

  cout << "\nEnter the endpoints of the line (x1, y1) and (x2, y2): ";
  float x1, y1, x2, y2;
  cin >> x1 >> y1 >> x2 >> y2;

  int gd = DETECT, gm;
  initgraph(&gd, &gm, ""); // using winbgim

  liang_barsky_clipper(xmin, ymin, xmax, ymax, x1, y1, x2, y2);
  getch();
  closegraph();
}

== See also ==
Algorithms used for the same purpose:

- Cyrus–Beck algorithm
- Nicholl–Lee–Nicholl algorithm
- Fast clipping
