= Cohen–Sutherland algorithm =

Line-clipping algorithm in computer graphics

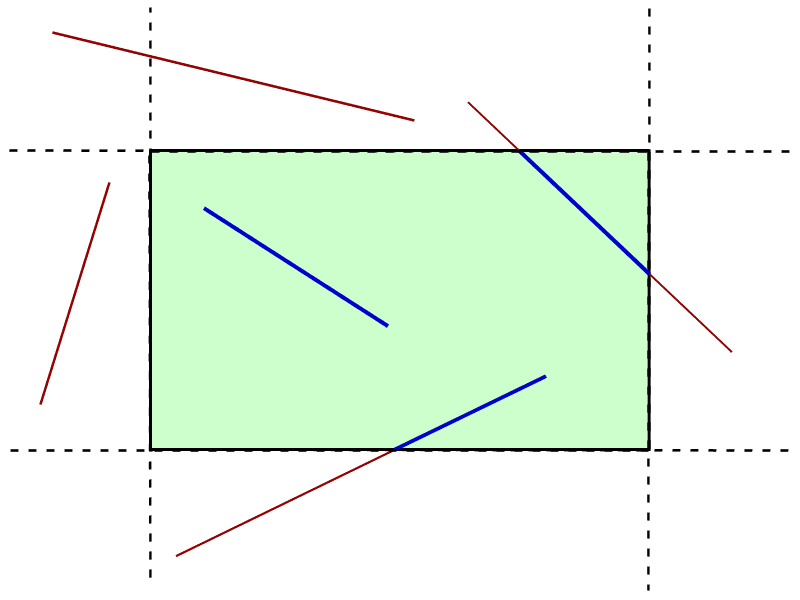
An example showing blue lines within the viewport, and red lines outside the viewport

In computer graphics, the Cohen–Sutherland algorithm is an algorithm used for line clipping. The algorithm divides a two-dimensional space into 9 regions and then efficiently determines the lines and portions of lines that are visible in the central region of interest (the viewport).

The algorithm was developed in 1967 during flight simulator work by Danny Cohen and Ivan Sutherland.

== The algorithm ==
The algorithm includes, excludes or partially includes the line based on whether:

- Both endpoints are in the viewport region (bitwise OR of endpoints = 0000): trivial accept.
- Both endpoints share at least one non-visible region, which implies that the line does not cross the visible region. (bitwise AND of endpoints ≠ 0000): trivial reject.
- Both endpoints are in different regions: in case of this nontrivial situation the algorithm finds one of the two points that is outside the viewport region (there will be at least one point outside). The intersection of the outpoint and extended viewport border is then calculated (i.e. with the parametric equation for the line), and this new point replaces the outpoint. The algorithm repeats until a trivial accept or reject occurs.

The numbers in the figure below are called outcodes. An outcode is computed for each of the two points in the line. The outcode will have 4 bits for two-dimensional clipping, or 6 bits in the three-dimensional case. The first bit is set to 1 if the point is above the viewport. The bits in the 2D outcode represent: top, bottom, right, left. For example, the outcode 1010 represents a point that is top-right of the viewport.

	left	central	right
top	1001	1000	1010
central	0001	0000	0010
bottom	0101	0100	0110

Note that the outcodes for endpoints must be recalculated on each iteration after the clipping occurs.

The Cohen–Sutherland algorithm can be used only on a rectangular clip window.

== Example C++ implementation ==
typedef int OutCode;

const int INSIDE = 0b0000;
const int LEFT   = 0b0001;
const int RIGHT  = 0b0010;
const int BOTTOM = 0b0100;
const int TOP    = 0b1000;

// Compute the bit code for a point (x, y) using the clip rectangle
// bounded diagonally by (xmin, ymin), and (xmax, ymax)

// ASSUME THAT xmax, xmin, ymax and ymin are global constants.

OutCode ComputeOutCode(double x, double y)
{
	OutCode code = INSIDE;  // initialised as being inside of clip window

	if (x < xmin)           // to the left of clip window
		code |= LEFT;
	else if (x > xmax)      // to the right of clip window
		code |= RIGHT;
	if (y < ymin)           // below the clip window
		code |= BOTTOM;
	else if (y > ymax)      // above the clip window
		code |= TOP;

	return code;
}

// Cohen–Sutherland clipping algorithm clips a line from
// P0 = (x0, y0) to P1 = (x1, y1) against a rectangle with 
// diagonal from (xmin, ymin) to (xmax, ymax).
bool CohenSutherlandLineClip(double& x0, double& y0, double& x1, double& y1)
{
	// compute outcodes for P0, P1, and whatever point lies outside the clip rectangle
	OutCode outcode0 = ComputeOutCode(x0, y0);
	OutCode outcode1 = ComputeOutCode(x1, y1);
	bool accept = false;

	while (true) {
		if (!(outcode0 | outcode1)) {
			// bitwise OR is 0: both points inside window; trivially accept and exit loop
			accept = true;
			break;
		} else if (outcode0 & outcode1) {
			// bitwise AND is not 0: both points share an outside zone (LEFT, RIGHT, TOP,
			// or BOTTOM), so both must be outside window; exit loop (accept is false)
			break;
		} else {
			// failed both tests, so calculate the line segment to clip
			// from an outside point to an intersection with clip edge
			double x, y;

			// At least one endpoint is outside the clip rectangle; pick it.
			OutCode outcodeOut = outcode1 > outcode0 ? outcode1 : outcode0;

			// Now find the intersection point;
			// use formulas:
			//   slope = (y1 - y0) / (x1 - x0)
			//   x = x0 + (1 / slope) * (ym - y0), where ym is ymin or ymax
			//   y = y0 + slope * (xm - x0), where xm is xmin or xmax
			// No need to worry about divide-by-zero because, in each case, the
			// outcode bit being tested guarantees the denominator is non-zero
			if (outcodeOut & TOP) {           // point is above the clip window
				x = x0 + (x1 - x0) * (ymax - y0) / (y1 - y0);
				y = ymax;
			} else if (outcodeOut & BOTTOM) { // point is below the clip window
				x = x0 + (x1 - x0) * (ymin - y0) / (y1 - y0);
				y = ymin;
			} else if (outcodeOut & RIGHT) {  // point is to the right of clip window
				y = y0 + (y1 - y0) * (xmax - x0) / (x1 - x0);
				x = xmax;
			} else if (outcodeOut & LEFT) {   // point is to the left of clip window
				y = y0 + (y1 - y0) * (xmin - x0) / (x1 - x0);
				x = xmin;
			}

			// Now we move outside point to intersection point to clip
			// and get ready for next pass.
			if (outcodeOut == outcode0) {
				x0 = x;
				y0 = y;
				outcode0 = ComputeOutCode(x0, y0);
			} else {
				x1 = x;
				y1 = y;
				outcode1 = ComputeOutCode(x1, y1);
			}
		}
	}
	return accept;
}

== See also ==
Algorithms used for the same purpose:

- Liang–Barsky algorithm
- Cyrus–Beck algorithm
- Nicholl–Lee–Nicholl algorithm
- Fast clipping
