= Ivan Sutherland =

American computer scientist (born 1938)

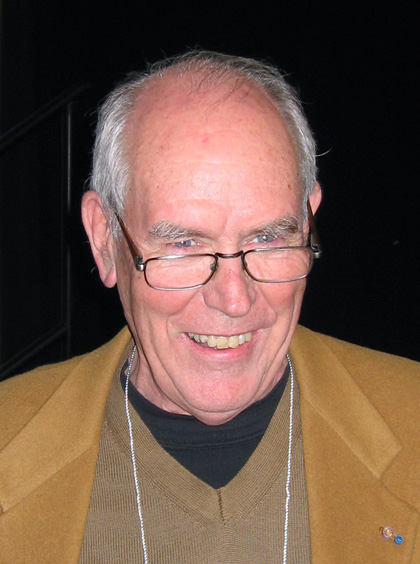
- Sutherland in 2008
- Born: Ivan Edward Sutherland; May 16, 1938 (age 88); Hastings, Nebraska, U.S.
- Education: Carnegie Mellon University (BS); California Institute of Technology (MS); Massachusetts Institute of Technology (PhD)
- Known for: Father of computer graphics Direct linear transformation Interactive computing Sketchpad; Zooming user interface Cohen–Sutherland algorithm Sutherland–Hodgman algorithm Logical effort
- Spouse: Marly Roncken (m. 2006)
- Awards: Turing Award (1988); Computer Pioneer Award (1985); IEEE John von Neumann Medal (1998); ACM Fellow (1994); Member of the National Academy of Sciences (1978); Kyoto Prize
- Scientific career
- Fields: Computer science Computer graphics
- Workplaces: Harvard University; University of Utah; Evans and Sutherland; California Institute of Technology; Carnegie Mellon University; Sun Microsystems; Portland State University; Advanced Research Projects Agency (1964–1966)
- Thesis: Sketchpad, a Man–Machine Graphical Communication System (1963)
- Doctoral advisor: Claude Shannon
- Doctoral students: Danny Cohen; Henri Gouraud; James H. Clark; Bui Tuong Phong; Franklin C. Crow; John Warnock

Ivan Edward Sutherland (born May 16, 1938) is an American computer scientist, widely regarded as a pioneer of computer graphics. His early work in computer graphics, as well as his teaching with David C. Evans in that subject at the University of Utah in the 1970s, was pioneering in the field. Sutherland, Evans, and their students from that era developed several foundations of modern computer graphics. He received the 1988 ACM Turing Award for the invention of the Sketchpad, an early predecessor to the sort of graphical user interface that has become ubiquitous in personal computers, and his contributions to computer graphics. He is a member of the National Academy of Engineering, as well as the National Academy of Sciences among many other major awards. In 2012, he was awarded the Kyoto Prize in Advanced Technology for "pioneering achievements in the development of computer graphics and interactive interfaces".

== Early life and education ==
Sutherland's father was from New Zealand; his mother, Anne Sutherland, was from Scotland. His family moved to Wilmette, Illinois, then Scarsdale, New York, for his father's career. Bert Sutherland, also a computer scientist, was his elder brother. Ivan Sutherland earned his bachelor's degree in electrical engineering from the Carnegie Institute of Technology, his master's degree from Caltech, and his Ph.D. from MIT in electrical engineering in 1963.

Sutherland invented Sketchpad in 1962 while at MIT. Claude Shannon signed on to supervise Sutherland's computer drawing thesis. Among others on his thesis committee were Marvin Minsky and Steven Coons. Sketchpad was an innovative program that influenced alternative forms of interaction with computers. Sketchpad could accept constraints and specified relationships among segments and arcs, including the diameter of arcs. It could draw both horizontal and vertical lines and combine them into figures and shapes. Figures could be copied, moved, rotated, or resized, retaining their basic properties. Sketchpad also had the first window-drawing program and clipping algorithm, which allowed zooming. Sketchpad ran on the Lincoln TX-2 computer.

== Career and research ==
From 1963 to 1965, after he received his PhD, he served in the U.S. Army, commissioning as an officer through the ROTC program at Carnegie Institute of Technology. As a first lieutenant, Sutherland replaced J. C. R. Licklider as the head of the US Defense Department Advanced Research Project Agency's Information Processing Techniques Office (IPTO), when Licklider took a job at IBM in 1964.

From 1965 to 1968, Sutherland was an associate professor of electrical engineering at Harvard University. Work with student Danny Cohen in 1967 led to the development of the Cohen–Sutherland computer graphics line clipping algorithm. In 1968, with his students Bob Sproull, Quintin Foster, Danny Cohen, and others he created the first head-mounted display that rendered images for the viewer's changing pose, as sensed by The Sword of Damocles, thus making the first virtual reality system. A prior system, Sensorama, used a head-mounted display to play back static video and other sensory stimuli. The optical see-through head-mounted display used in Sutherland's VR system was a stock item used by U.S. military helicopter pilots to view video from cameras mounted on the helicopter's belly.

From 1968 to 1974, Sutherland was a professor at the University of Utah. Among his students there were Alan Kay, inventor of the Smalltalk language, Gordon W. Romney (computer and cybersecurity scientist), who rendered the first 3D images at U of U, Henri Gouraud, who devised the Gouraud shading technique, Frank Crow, who went on to develop antialiasing methods, Jim Clark, founder of Silicon Graphics, Henry Fuchs, and Edwin Catmull, who co-founded Pixar and was the president of Walt Disney and Pixar Animation Studios.

In 1968 Sutherland co-founded Evans & Sutherland with his friend and colleague David C. Evans. The company did pioneering work in the field of real-time hardware, accelerated 3D computer graphics, and printer languages. Former employees of Evans & Sutherland included the future founders of Adobe (John Warnock) and Silicon Graphics (Jim Clark).

From 1974 to 1978 Sutherland was the Fletcher Jones Professor of Computer Science at California Institute of Technology, where he was the founding head of that school's computer science department. He then founded a consulting firm, Sutherland, Sproull and Associates, which was purchased in 1990 by Sun Microsystems to form the seed of its research division, Sun Labs.

Sutherland was a fellow and vice president at Sun Microsystems. Sutherland was a visiting scholar in the computer science division at University of California, Berkeley (fall 2005 – spring 2008). Since 2009, Sutherland and Roncken have led the research in Asynchronous Systems at Portland State University.

=== Awards and honors ===
- Computer History Museum Fellow "for the Sketchpad computer-aided design system and for lifelong contributions to computer graphics and education", 2005
- R&D 100 Award, 2004 (team)
- IEEE John von Neumann Medal, 1998
- Elected a Fellow of the Association for Computing Machinery in 1994
- Electronic Frontier Foundation EFF Pioneer Award, 1994
- ACM Software System Award, 1993
- Honorary Doctor of Philosophy from the University of North Carolina at Chapel Hill (1986).
- Turing Award, 1988
- Computerworld Honors Program, Leadership Award, 1987
- IEEE Emanuel R. Piore Award –
  1986 "For pioneering work in the development of interactive computer graphics systems and contributions to computer science education."
- Elected a member of the National Academy of Sciences of the United States in 1978
- National Academy of Engineering member

1973 "for creative contributions in computer science and computer graphics, particularly in the study of the interfaces between men and machines"

- Kyoto Prize 2012, in the category of advanced technology.
- National Inventors Hall of Fame Inductee, 2016.
- Washington Award, 2018
- BBVA Fronteras del conocimiento 2019.

=== Quotes ===
- "A display connected to a digital computer gives us a chance to gain familiarity with concepts not realizable in the physical world. It is a looking glass into a mathematical wonderland."
- "The ultimate display would, of course, be a room within which the computer can control the existence of matter. A chair displayed in such a room would be good enough to sit in. Handcuffs displayed in such a room would be confining, and a bullet displayed in such a room would be fatal."
- When asked: "How could you possibly have done the first interactive graphics program, the first non-procedural programming language, the first object oriented software system, all in one year?", Sutherland replied: "Well, I didn't know it was hard."
- "It's not an idea until you write it down."
- "Without the fun, none of us would go on!"

=== Patents ===
Sutherland has more than 60 patents, including:

- US Patent 7,636,361 (2009) Apparatus and method for high-throughput asynchronous communication with flow control
- US Patent 7,417,993 (2008) Apparatus and method for high-throughput asynchronous communication
- US Patent 7,384,804 (2008) Method and apparatus for electronically aligning capacitively coupled mini-bars
- US patent 3,889,107 (1975) System of polygon sorting by dissection
- US patent 3,816,726 (1974) Computer Graphics Clipping System for Polygons
- US patent 3,732,557 (1973) Incremental Position-Indicating System
- US patent 3,684,876 (1972) Vector Computing System as for use in a Matrix Computer
- US patent 3,639,736 (1972) Display Windowing by Clipping

=== Publications ===
- SketchPad, 2004 from "CAD software – history of CAD CAM" by CADAZZ
- Sutherland's 1963 Ph.D. Thesis from Massachusetts Institute of Technology republished in 2003 by University of Cambridge as Technical Report Number 574, Sketchpad, A Man-Machine Graphical Communication System. His thesis supervisor was Claude Shannon, father of information theory.
- Duchess Chips for Process-Specific Wire Capacitance Characterization, The, by Jon Lexau, Jonathan Gainsley, Ann Coulthard and Ivan E. Sutherland, Sun Microsystems Laboratories Report Number TR-2001-100, October 2001
- Technology And Courage by Ivan Sutherland, Sun Microsystems Laboratories Perspectives Essay Series, Perspectives-96-1 (April 1996)
- Counterflow Pipeline Processor Architecture, by Ivan E. Sutherland, Charles E. Molnar (Charles Molnar), and Robert F. Sproull (Bob Sproull), Sun Microsystems Laboratories Report Number TR-94-25, April 1994
- Oral history interview with Ivan Sutherland at Charles Babbage Institute, University of Minnesota, Minneapolis. Sutherland describes his tenure as head of the Information Processing Techniques Office (IPTO) from 1963 to 1965. He discusses the existing programs as established by J. C. R. Licklider and the new initiatives started while he was there: projects in graphics and networking, the ILLIAC IV, and the Macromodule program.

== Personal life ==
On May 28, 2006, Ivan Sutherland married Marly Roncken. He has two children. His elder brother, Bert Sutherland, was also a computer science researcher.

== See also ==
- List of pioneers in computer science
- Timeline of early 3D computer graphics hardware
