= Bob Sproull =

American computer scientist (born c. 1945)

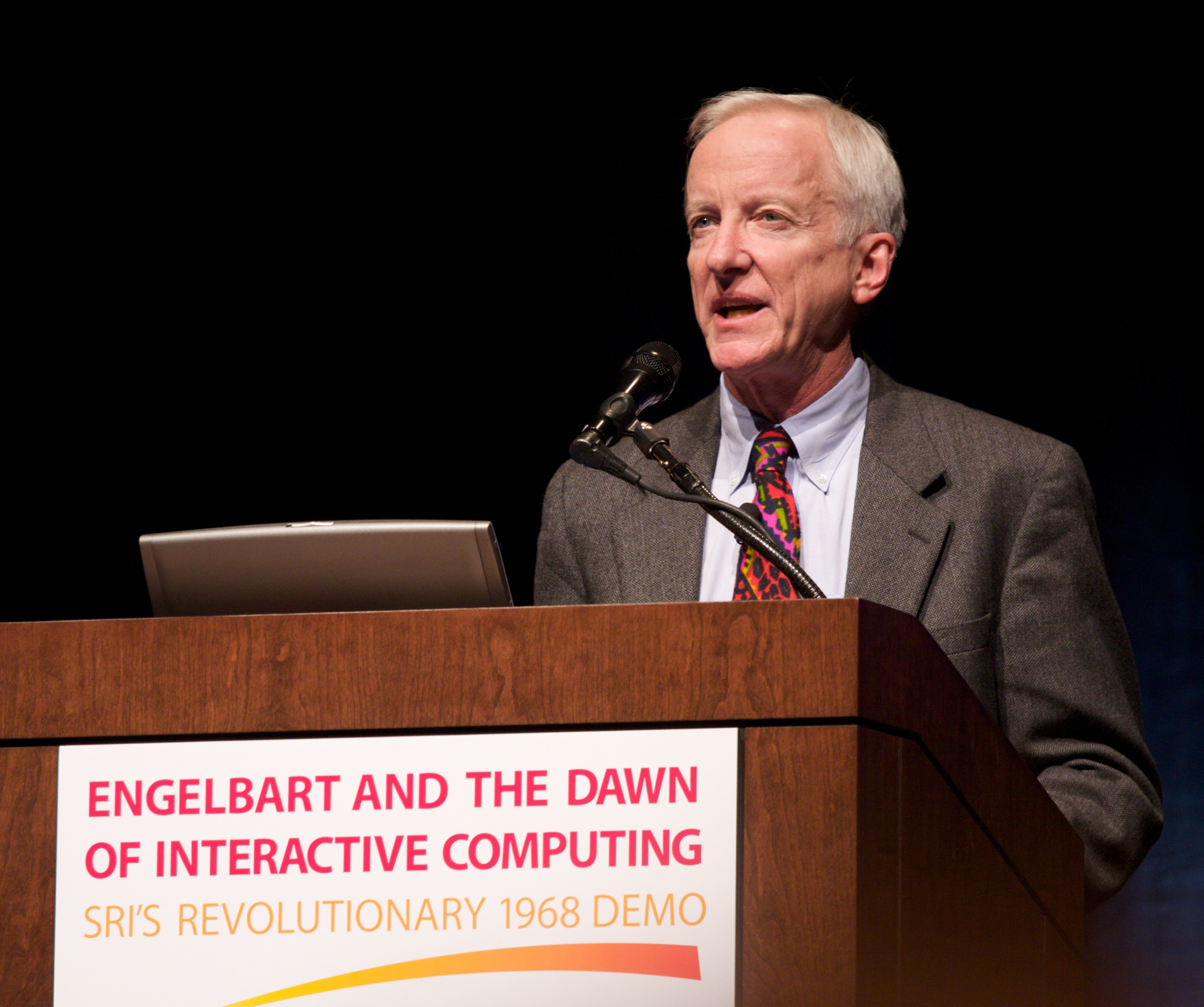
- Bob Sproull in 2008
- Born: c. 1945
- Education: Harvard University, Stanford University
- Scientific career
- Thesis: Strategy construction using a synthesis of heuristic and decision-theoretic methods (1977)
- Doctoral advisor: Jerome A. Feldman
- Doctoral students: Brian Reid; Carl Ebeling; James Gosling; Pradeep Sindhu

Robert Fletcher "Bob" Sproull (born c. 1945) is an American computer scientist, who worked for Oracle Corporation where he was director of Oracle Labs in Burlington, Massachusetts. He is currently an adjunct professor at the College of Information and Computer Sciences, at the University of Massachusetts Amherst.

== Biography ==
While working towards his B.A. in physics at Harvard College in 1967, Sproull met Ivan Sutherland. Together, they worked on head-mounted displays, which led the way for 3-dimensional virtual reality.

Sproull received his master's degree in computer science from Stanford University in 1970, and doctorate in computer science from Stanford in 1977.

Sproull worked as a researcher for Xerox Palo Alto Research Center from December 1973 to August 1977. While at Xerox PARC, he worked on the design of the Alto personal computer, the first laser printers, page description languages and the initial PC-type operating systems.

In 1973, Sproull and William M. Newman wrote Principles of Interactive Computer Graphics; a second edition was published in 1979. This was the first comprehensive textbook on computer graphics, and was regarded as the graphics "bible," until it was succeeded by Foley and van Dam's Computer Graphics: Principles and Practice.

Sproull was an associate professor of computer science at Carnegie Mellon University. In 1980, Bob Sproull and Ivan Sutherland founded a consulting firm, Sutherland, Sproull and Associates.

In 1990, Sun Microsystems bought out Sutherland, Sproull and Associates for its patents and key people. This led to the creation of Sun Microsystems Laboratories, where Sproull worked on asynchronous processor design. In 2006 he became director of the laboratories. In 2010 after Sun was purchased by Oracle Corporation, it became Oracle Labs.

Sproull is also a member of the National Academy of Engineering, a Fellow of the American Academy of Arts and Sciences, and has served on the US Air Force Scientific Advisory Board. He is a former chair of the United States National Research Council's Computer Science and Telecommunications Board (CSTB). He has co-authored several books in addition to Principles of Interactive Computer Graphics, such as Logical Effort, and holds 7 patents.

== Publications ==
- Newman, W., Sproull, R. (1979), Principles of Interactive Computer Graphics, Mcgraw-Hill College, ISBN 0-07-046338-7.
- Molnar, C., Sproull, R., Sutherland, I. (1994), Counterflow Pipeline Processor Architecture, Sun Microsystems, Technical Report TR-94-25.
