= Julian Richards (director) =

Welsh film director

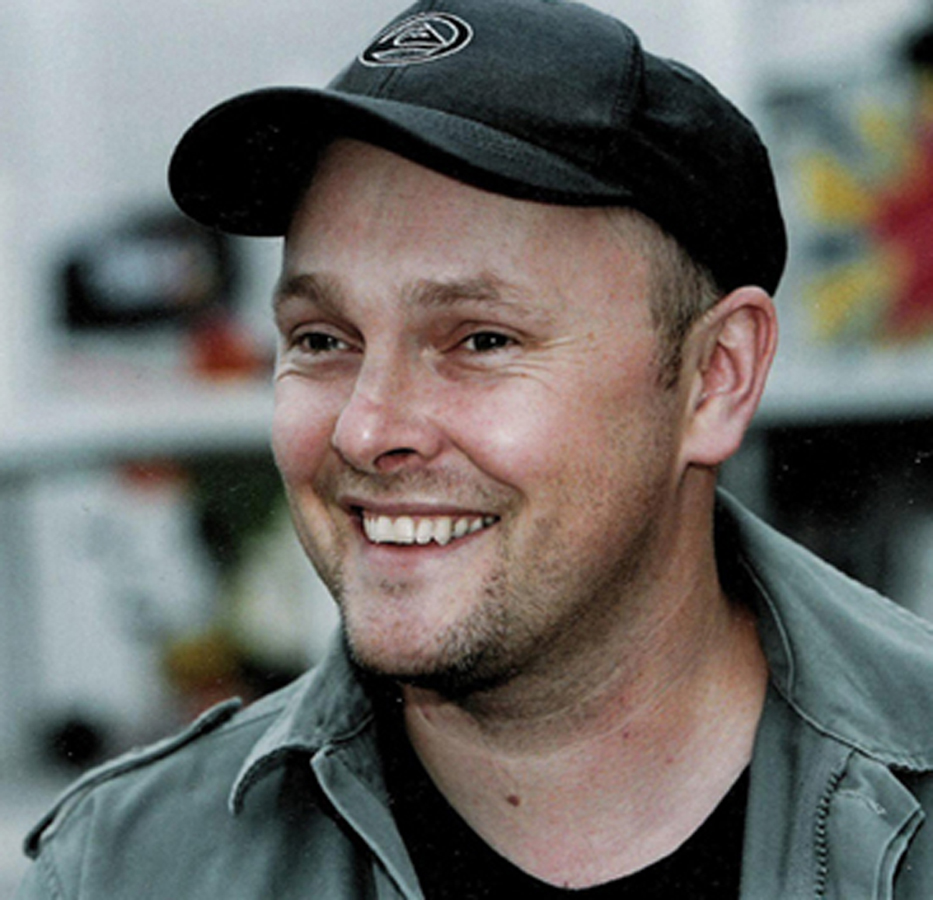
- Born: 31 July 1968 (age 57); Newport, Wales
- Occupations: Film director, producer
- Website: jingafilms.com

Julian Richards (born 31 July 1968) is a Welsh film director. He is associated with the Cool Cymru era of culture and arts in Wales.

== Biography ==
=== Early life ===
Julian Richards was born in Newport, South Wales, where his father owned DIY retail store Handiland. Inspired by his uncle Rex Richards Hollywood acting career, Julian decided to become a film director and produced several short films on super 8 mm including The Curse of Cormac, Gang War, Evil Inspirations and The Girl That Cried Wolf which was broadcast by the BBC in the "16 and Up Video Showcase".

=== Education ===
In Newport, Julian attended St Julian's Comprehensive School and Gwent College of Higher Education where he studied Art & Design Foundation. In 1985 he attended the film school at Bournemouth and Poole College of Art where he directed two Super 8 mm shorts "Time" and "Infanticide" and two 16 mm shorts Pirates and Queen Sacrifice. Pirates won The Starting Out Award at the Celtic Media Festival 1988 and Queen Sacrifice won the Thames Television Award for Best Fiction Film at the BP Expo–British Short Film Festival 1990 before being broadcast on Screenplay Firsts.

In 1988, Richards attended the National Film and Television School in Beaconsfield, where he was invited to direct In with the Rent for BBC Wales and A Week in the Life a documentary about a cattle drover for S4C. In 1992, Richards graduated the NFTS with the 16 mm short Bad Company, broadcast on ITV Wales and selected to screen at AFI Fest in Los Angeles.

=== Directing career ===
In 1992, Richards moved to Los Angeles where he worked for Shapiro Glickenhaus Entertainment directing an EPK for Slaughter of the Innocents starring Scott Glenn and adapted Chris Westwood's novel Calling All Monsters for Steven Spielberg's Amblin Entertainment at Universal Studios. In 1994 he returned to the UK to direct A Mutter of Voices for BBC2 and twelve episodes of the Channel 4 soap Brookside, including the body under the patio episodes.

In 1996, he wrote and directed his debut feature film Darklands, a brooding tale of underground paganism starring Jon Finch, Craig Fairbrass and Rowena King. A festival favourite winning several awards including the Méliès d'Argent for Best European Fantasy Film 1997, Darklands was picked up for distribution by Pathé. The film forms part of the cultural era in Wales identified as Cool Cymru. Richards followed up with Silent Cry starring Emily Woof, Douglas Henshall, Frank Finlay, Kevin Whately, Clive Russell and Craig Kelly, an urban thriller which received its UK premiere on Channel 5.

In 2003, Richards expanded into film production, establishing Prolific Films through which he produced and directed the micro-budget shocker The Last Horror Movie which won sixteen awards including Best UK Feature at Raindance Film Festival and the Méliès d'Argent for Best European Fantasy Film 2005. This video diary of a serial killer was theatrically released in the US by Fangoria and in the UK by Tartan Films.

In 2006 Richards produced and directed coming-of-age thriller Summer Scars which won two BAFTA Cymru awards and was nominated for Best Film. Summer Scars was released in North America by TLA Releasing and in the UK by Soda Pictures. In 2008, Richards directed Charles Dickens's England featuring Sir Derek Jacobi, a documentary about the life of the 19th century author, which received a theatrical release in the UK by Guerilla Films before being broadcast by Sky Television. In 2011 Richards directed Shiver, a psychological horror starring Danielle Harris, John Jarratt, Casper Van Dien and Rae Dawn Chong, which was released in North America by Image Entertainment. In 2018 Richards directed Daddy's Girl, a psychological horror starring Costas Mandylor and Jemma Dallender which was released in North America by Cleopatra Entertainment and Reborn, a paranormal horror starring Barbara Crampton, Michael Pare, Kayleigh Gilbert, Rae Dawn Chong, Chaz Bono, Monte Markham and Peter Bogdanovich which was released in North America by Vertical Entertainment. In 2019, Richards wrote and directed Bad Santa, a five-minute episode in the Christmas themed horror anthology Deathcember which was released in North America by Scream Factory.

=== Filmography ===
- Deathcember (2019) – Director, Writer
- Daddy's Girl (2018) – Director
- Reborn (2018) – Director
- Shiver (2012) – Director
- Charles Dickens's England (2009) – Director
- Summer Scars (2007) – Director, producer, co-Writer
- The Last Horror Movie (2003) – Director, producer, co-Writer
- Silent Cry (2002) – Director
- Darklands (1997) – Director, writer

=== Film sales and distribution career ===
In 2006 Richards founded world sales company Jinga Films which represents over 133 genre films.

=== Jinga filmography ===
- Everyone Is Going To Die (2024)
- Protos (2024)
- The Well (2023)
- Iconic (2023)
- Maya (2023)
- Swap (2023)
- Creepy Pasta (2023)
- Transmission (2023)
- The Witch Game (a.k.a. Juego Des Brujas) (2023)
- Goliath (2022)
- Dawn of the Great Steppe (2022)
- The Ghost writer (2022)
- They Wait in the Dark (2022)
- The Ones You Didn't Burn (2022)
- The Quantum Devil (2022)
- The Ghosts of Monday (2022)
- Shepherd (2021)
- An Unquiet Grave (2021)
- Girl Next (2021)
- Night at the Eagle Inn (2021)
- Red Snow (2021)
- The Unburied (a.k.a. El Corpo Insepulto) (2021)
- The Funeral Home (La Funeraria) (2020)
- Angie Lost Girls (2020)
- Exquisite Corpse (2020)
- Beast Within (2019)
- Ten Minutes To Midnight (2020)
- Scavenger (2020)
- Chop Chop (2020)
- Reborn (2019)
- Antrum (2019)
- The Ringmaster (a.k.a. Finale) (2019)
- Sadistic Intentions (2019)
- I am Toxic (a.k.a. Soy Toxico) (2019)
- Infection (a.k.a. Infeccion) (2019)
- Snuff Tapes (2019)
- The Quarry (a.k.a. En El Poso) (2019)
- The Curse of Dracula (a.k.a. The Curse of Valburga) (2019)
- Echoes of Fear (2019)
- Lust (2018)
- The Night Sitter (2018)
- The Ice Cream Truck (2018)
- The Damned (a.k.a. Bab Jahannan)(2018)
- The Cleaning Lady (2018)
- Framed (2018)
- Central Park (2018)
- All The Creatures Were Stirring (2018)
- Nazi Undead (2018)
- Desolation (2017)
- Ruin Me (2017)
- Ten: The Secret Mission (2017)
- Still/Born (2017)
- Replace (2017)
- Sequence Break (2017)
- Freddy Eddy (2017)
- Crone Wood (2017)
- Ecstasy (2017)
- Replace (2017)
- Our Evil (a.k.a. Mal Nosso) (2017)
- Freddy Eddy (2016)
- Incarnation (2016)
- The Night Of The Virgin (2016)
- Tonight She Comes (2016)
- Love Is Thicker Than Water (2016)
- Beyond The Gates (2016)
- Lost Solace (2016)
- Through The Shadow (2016)
- The Rift (2016)
- Atroz (a.k.a. Atrocious) (2015)
- My Honor Was Loyalty (2015)
- Worry Dolls (2015)
- The Lesson (2015)
- Night Of The Living Deb (2015)
- Last Girl Standing (2015)
- Scherzo Diabolico (2015)
- Hellions" (2015)
- Fear Clinic (2015)
- Luna Del Miel (a.k.a. Honeymoon) (2015)
- Francesca (2015)
- Feed The Devil (2015)
- La Cara Del Diablo (a.k.a. Face Of The Devil) (2015)
- La Entitad (a.k.a. The Entity) (2015)
- The Dead 2 (2014)
- La Casa Del Fin De Los Tiempos (a.k.a. The House t The End Of Time) (2014)
- The Nesting (a.k.a. Apparition) (2014)
- The Canal (2014)
- Blood Moon (2014)
- Deadly Virtues (2014)
- Drones (2013)
- AB Negative (2013)
- Goldberg And Eisenburg (2013)
- On Tender Hooks (2013)
- The House with 100 Eyes (2013)
- Para Elisa (2013)
- The Human Race (2013)
- Hansel And Gretel Get Baked (2012)
- After (2012)
- Sawney: Flesh Of Man (a.k.a. Lord Of Darkness) (2012)
- Tulpa (2012)
- Closed Circuit Extreme (2012)
- Rites Of Spring (2011)
- The Dead (2011)
- Midnight Son (2011)
- Bad Meat (2011)
- Ghetta Life (2011)
- Face To Face (2011)
- Cherry (2011)
- Gandu (2011)
- Rabies (a.k.a. Kalavet) (2010)
- Bedways (2010)
- The Bunny Game (2010)
- A Serbian Film (2010)
- Iron Doors (2010)
- The Hunt (2010)
- Timer (2009)
- Shadow (2009)
- Gnaw (2009)
- Salvage (2009)
- The Disappeared (2009)
- Hush Your Mouth (2008)
- Exodus (2008)
- Summer Scars (2006)
- Outlanders (2007)
- Jetsam (2007)
- Everything (2005)
- Wild Country (2005)
- Evilenko (2004)
- The Last Horror Movie (2003)
- Silent Cry (2002)
- Darklands (1997)
- Mute Witness (1995)
- Rawhead Rex (1986)
- Underworld (1986)
