= Linda Regan =

British actress and author (born 1949)

- Born: Linda Mary Drinkwater; 5 November 1949 (age 76); Brixton, London
- Occupation: Actress
- Years active: 1970–present
- Spouse: Brian Murphy (m. 1995; died 2025)
- Relatives: Carol Drinkwater (sister)
- Website: lindareganonline.co.uk

Linda Regan (born 5 November 1949), born Linda Mary Drinkwater, is a British actress and author, who has appeared on television, film, radio and on stage. She is best known for her role as yellowcoat April Wingate in the British holiday camp sitcom Hi-de-Hi!.

== Early life ==
Born in Brixton, London, Regan is a daughter of bandleader and agent Peter Regan (born Peter Albert Drinkwater) and Phyllis McCormack, an Irish nurse; Regan's older sister is the actress and writer Carol Drinkwater. They moved to Rochester, before settling in Bromley when Regan was five. Regan often helped her father while entertaining, such as helping with Punch and Judy and balloon modelling. After leaving school, Regan attended the Worcester Repertory Company.

== Career ==
Regan made her television debut in 1970, in an episode of the ITV sitcom On the Buses. Shortly after, she appeared in the film version of the same name. Sha also had a role in the festive Carry On Christmas special opposite Sid James. This was followed by roles in programmes such as Doctor at Large, Softly, Softly: Task Force, Special Branch and Dixon of Dock Green. She was also the stunt double for Katy Manning's Jo Grant in the Doctor Who episode "Carnival of Monsters" in 1973. In the mid-1970s, Regan appeared in several sex comedy films including Confessions of a Pop Performer (1975), Carry On England (1976) and Adventures of a Private Eye (1977). She also appeared in the films A Private Enterprise (1974), The Hiding Place (1975) and Quadrophenia (1979) and had a main role in the hospital drama General Hospital from 1976 to 1977. Regan appeared in the first episode of the drama series Minder in 1979 starring George Cole and Dennis Waterman and played a Swedish pop star in Bergerac, before having a role in the film The Hit (1984) with John Hurt and Terence Stamp. She followed this with a main role in the holiday camp sitcom Hi-de-Hi! as April, a character she would play from 1984 until the show's end in 1988, appearing in a total of twenty-four episodes.

After appearances in Birds of a Feather, thriller Framed and the crime drama The Knock, Regan starred in five episodes of The Bill before appearing as Harry's mother in all 4 series of children's drama series Harry and Cosh from 1999 to 2003. She continues her career on both stage and screen, including Holby City, Doctors and Run for Your Wife, as well as appearing in several short films and commercials, and writing award-winning crime novels. Regan was in two episodes of podcast sitcom Barmy Dale in 2023 and played alongside her husband Brian Murphy as the mayor of Barmy Dale Felicity Palmer.

== Personal life ==
Regan was married to actor Brian Murphy from 1995 until his death in 2025. She had two stepsons from his previous marriage.

She is dyslexic and was not encouraged at school but wrote stories from a young age. Just before her first book was published, in 2005, Regan was kidnapped at knifepoint and forced into a car, later jumping from the vehicle to escape. Soon after, she was diagnosed with cancer, which she believes was caused by her kidnap ordeal; she overcame the disease.

A dog lover since childhood, Regan runs her own blog in which she communicates with other dog owners.

== Filmography ==
=== Film ===
Year	Title	Role	Notes
1971	On the Buses	Pretty Girl on Bus	
1973	Adolf Hitler: My Part in His Downfall	Girl at Dance	
1974	Keep It Up, Jack	Gloria	
1974	A Private Enterprise	Eve	
1975	The Hiding Place	Prostitute	
1975	Confessions of a Pop Performer	Brenda Climax	
1976	Carry On England	A.T.S. Private Taylor	
1977	Hardcore	Secretary	
1977	Adventures of a Private Eye	Clarissa	
1979	Quadrophenia	Chief Rocker Girl	
1984	The Hit	Madame Isabella	
1999	Janice Beard	Unknown	
1999	Holding On	Pru	
2003	The Last Horror Movie	Terri	
2004	Let Go	Susan	Short film
2012	Blitz and Bananas	Emily Spratt	
2012	Run for Your Wife	Allotment woman	Cameo
2016	After Hours	Shirley	Short film
2018	The Vampire of Soho	Beryl	Short film

=== Television ===
Year	Title	Role	Notes
1970	Z Cars	Factory Girl	Episode: "Stop Over: Part 1"
1970	Carry On Christmas	Island Girl	TV film
1970	On the Buses	Edna	Episode: "Christmas Duty"
1971	Doctor at Large	Schoolgirl	Episode: "Doctor Dish"
1971	Softly, Softly: Task Force	Girl in Lorry	Episode: "Copper Wire"
1972	Engelbert with the Young Generation	Girl in Film Sequence	Episode: #1.11
1972	Doctor in Charge	Girl at Dance	Episode: "The Taming of the Wolf"
1972	Villains	Young Woman	Episode: "Belinda"
1972	Sacha's Back in Town	Belly Dancer	Episode: #1.4
1973	Special Branch		Episode: "Red Herring"
1974	Seven Faces of Woman	Barbara	Episode: "Polly Put the Kettle On"
1975	Dixon of Dock Green	Liz Rowley	Episode: "On a Moody Complaint"
1975	Scene	Polly	Episode: "Because I Said So"
1976	Barney's Last Battle	Lily Ayres	TV film
1976–1977	General Hospital	Susan	3 episodes
1977	ITV Playhouse	Valerie	Episode: "The Proofing Session"
1978	Z Cars	Woman at Bus Stop	Episode: "A Woman's Place"
1979	Minder	Liz	Episode: "Gunfight at the O.K. Laundrette"
1980	The Gentle Touch	Marilyn	Episode: "Break-In"
1982	Kelly Monteith	Various	Episode: #4.1
1984	Bergerac	Gudrun Olfsberg	Episode: "A Cry in the Night"
1984–1988	Hi-de-Hi!	April	24 episodes
1985	Dempsey and Makepeace	Gloria	Episode: "Blind Eye"
1985	C.A.T.S. Eyes	Naval Computer Operator	Episode: "Something Nasty Down Below"
1985	Lost in London	Rosey	TV film
1986	C.A.T.S. Eyes	Amber	Episode: "Hit List"
1988	Comic Relief	Hospital Patient	TV special
1988	The Bill	Burnside's Girlfriend	Episode: "Snout"
1991	Birds of a Feather	Annie	Episode: "We'll Always Have Majorca"
1992	The Bill	Building Society Manageress	Episode: "Sympathy for the Devil"
1992	Framed	Mrs Minton	Episode: #1.2
1992	Crime Monthly	Linda Calvey	Episode: "The Black Widow"
1992	Fool's Gold: The Story of the Brink's-Mat Robbery	Brenda Noye	TV film
1993	Over the Rainbow	Jenny	Episode: "The House of the Rising Sun"
1994	The Detectives	Barmaid	Episode: "Witness"
1994	The Bill	Pub Manageress	Episode: "Pals"
1994	The Knock	June	3 episodes
1994	Hale and Pace	Wife in Hospital	2 episodes
1995	Ghostbusters of East Finchley	Prostitute	Episode: #1.1
1997	The Bill	Lizzie Byrne	Episode: "Age Gaps"
1998	The Bill	Barmaid	Episode: "Like Family"
1999–2003	Harry and Cosh	Harry's Mother	All 45 episodes
2000	London's Burning	Ivy	Episode: #12.6
2001	Men Only	Aerobics Teacher	TV film
2004	Doctors	Noreen Topper	Episode: "What the Doctor Saw"
2004	Billie: Girl of the Future	Barbara	Episode: #1.4
2005	Tittybangbang	Various	Episode: "Pilot"
2007	Holby City	Polly Hunter	Episode: "Past Imperfect"
2014	Doctors	Hilary Cavendish	Episode: "Good Guys"
2020	Bruised Sky	Linda	Episode: "A Mother's Love"
2023–2025	Barmy Dale	Felicity Palmer	2 episodes

== Writing ==
- Behind You!. (2006 or 2007). Creme de La Crime. ISBN 0-9551589-2-3. ISBN 978-0-9551589-2-6.
- Dead Like Her. (5 February 2007). Creme de La Crime. ISBN 0-9557078-8-9. ISBN 978-0-9557078-8-9.
- Passion Killers. (2008). Creme de La Crime. ISBN 0-9551589-8-2. ISBN 978-0-9551589-8-8.
- Brotherhood of Blades. (28 July 2011). Creme de La Crime. ISBN 1-78029-009-8. ISBN 978-1-78029-009-6.
- Street Girls. (28 March 2012). Creme De La Crime.
- Guts for Garters. (March 2015). Accent Press.
- SisterHoods. (December 2016). Accent Press.
- The Terror Within. (December 2019). Accent Press.

== Theatre roles ==
=== Plays ===
(incomplete)

Year	Title	Role	Venue
1975	Straight Up	Lila	Swan Theatre, Worcester
1976	Dirty Linen	Maddie	UK Tour
1976	Seven Girls	Lisa	Open Space Theatre, Tottenham
1977	Get Some In!	Maureen	Princess Theatre, Torquay
1979	Dirty Linen	Miss Gotobed	West End, London
1980	Once in a Lifetime	Florabel Leigh	Piccadilly Theatre, West End, London
1980	Legend	Marilyn Monroe	Haymarket Theatre, Basingstoke
1981	Last of the Red Hot Lovers	Bobbi Michele	Venn Street Arts Centre, York
1981	Boeing-Boeing		Harrogate Theatre, Harrogate
1981	What the Butler Saw	Geraldine Barclay	Horncastle
1982	Jumpers		Theatre Royal, York
1982	A Funny Thing Happened on the Way to the Forum		Theatre Royal, York
1982	The Mating Game	Honey	Lyceum Theatre, Crewe
1982	Once a Catholic	Mary McGinty	Churchill Theatre, Bromley
1983	My Friend Miss Flint	Lucy	Theatre Royal, Windsor
1983	Henry IV, Part 1	Lady Percy	UK Tour with RSC
1983	Macbeth	Lady Macbeth	UK Tour with RSC
1985	Steaming	Josie	Mercury Theatre, Colchester
1986	Hi-de-Hi Spirits	April Wingate	UK Tour
1987	The Mating Game	Julia	Babbacombe Theatre, Torquay
1987	Veronica's Room	The Girl	Chelmsford
1988	Wife Begins at Forty	Linda Harper	Chelmsford Civic Centre, Chelmsford
1988	Extremeties	Marjorie	Chelmsford Civic Centre, Chelmsford
1988	Noises Off	Brooke Ashton	UK Tour
1989	A Day in the Death of Joe Egg	Sheila	Chelmsford Civic Centre, Chelmsford
1989	One for the Road	Pauline	Chelmsford Civic Centre, Chelmsford
1989	You’ll Do for Me!	Diane	UK Tour
1990	My Wife Whatsername		Chelmsford Civic Centre, Chelmsford
1990	Steaming	Josie	UK Tour
1991	Go Back for Murder		Chelmsford Civic Centre, Chelmsford
1991	Bedroom Farce		Chelmsford Civic Centre, Chelmsford
1991	Wife Begins at Forty	Linda Harper	Devonshire Park Theatre, Eastbourne
1992	Run for Your Wife	Mary Smith	Chelmsford Civic Centre, Chelmsford
1994	Macbeth	Lady Macbeth	Cannizaro Park Open Air Theatre, Wimbledon
1996	Stepping Out	Sylvia	The Mill at Sonning, London
1997	Bartrum		Bearcat Sitcom Club, St Margaret’s
1997	That’s Showbiz!	Loretta	Wimbledon Theatre, Wimbledon
1998	You’re Only Young Twice	Sue	Poole Arts Centre, Poole
1999	Round and Round the Garden		Grand Theatre, Swansea
2001	You’re Only Young Twice	Sue	UK Tour
2012	Goodwood Murder Mystery		Goodwood House
2016	A Day in the Lives of Frankie Abbott	Marion	UK Tour

=== Pantomime ===
Year	Title	Role	Venue
1974–1975	Puss in Boots	Princess Pearl	Assembly Hall Theatre, Tunbridge Wells
1976–1977	Puss in Boots	Puss	Royal Victoria Hall, Southborough
1986–1987	Jack and the Beanstalk	The Fairy	New Wimbledon Theatre, Wimbledon
1987–1988	Cinderella	Cinderella	Octagon Theatre, Yeovil
1988–1989	Dick Whittington	The Good Fairy	Loughborough Town Hall, Loughborough
1989–1990	Jack and the Beanstalk	Vegetable Fairy	Tameside Theatre, Ashton under Lyne
1990–1991	Cinderella	Cinderella	Library Theatre, Solihull
1991–1992	Dick Whittington	Fairy Nuff	Beck Theatre, Hayes
1992–1993	The Adventures of Robinson Crusoe	Fairy Seaspray	Hazlitt Theatre, Maidstone
1993–1994	Dick Whittington	Fairy Bowbells	Spa Centre, Leamington
1994–1995	Cinderella	Cinderella	Hazlitt Theatre, Maidstone
1996–1997	Sleeping Beauty	Good Fairy Dreamawhile	Wyllyotts Theatre, Potters Bar
1999–2000	Cinderella	Fairy Godmother	Horsham Arts Centre, Horsham
