= Brain Damage Films =

American independent film production company known for its horror movies

- Type: Subsidiary
- Industry: Film
- Founded: 2001
- Founder: Darrin Ramage
- Headquarters: Scottsdale, Arizona, U.S.
- Products: Motion pictures
- Parent: Maxim Media Marketing, Inc.
- Website: braindamagefilms.com

Brain Damage Films is a US-based international independent film production and distribution company. It was founded in 2001 by Darrin Ramage. A division located in the UK was launched in September 2009. The company's films are noted for their horror aspects and Z movie budgets. They are also known for a variety of shock/exploitation films, most notably the Traces of Death series, which was produced in response to the popularity of the Faces of Death series.

== Production ==
Brain Damage Films movies usually contain sexuality, nudity, gore and graphic violence, and other elements common to horror films. Founder Darrin Ramage is quoted as saying "everyone is looking for B and B: blood and boobs." After producing and distributing direct-to-video horror films, including Death Factory, Hell's Highway, and The Vulture's Eye, Brain Damage Films created a fan following which continues to grow. The fans are often referred to as "Gorehounds."

Brain Damage Films has served as a launching pad for several people who are now well-known within the horror film genre, including: Ron Jeremy (who has appeared in at least four Brain Damage Films movies), David C. Hayes (wrote, produced, and acted in Brain Damage Films movies), and Sean Tretta (wrote, directed, and produced several Brain Damage Films movies).

Brain Damage Films has explored other territories, including television and music. In 2007, New York-based production company Chatsby Films filmed and produced a reality TV show, titled "Gorehounds", about the Brain Damage Films office and its employees. The show was never broadcast on a television network or released in any form. The Brain Damage Music division was launched in 2011. Its only release so far has been Arizona metal band Reign of Vengeance's album "Disemboweling Swine".

== Controversy and criticism ==
Films produced and distributed by Brain Damage Films are often criticized for their production value and quality. On 22 June 2005, the British Board of Film Classification rejected Traces of Death, stating that "the work presents no journalistic, educational or other justifying context for the images shown." On 14 December 2005, the German government banned Brain Damage Films' website from appearing on major search engines such as Google, stating that the website was "reported as illegal by a German regulatory body".

== Films ==
Brain Damage Films has produced at least six original independent horror films since 2002:

- Hell's Highway (2002)
- Death Factory (2002)
- Goth (2003)
- The Vulture's Eye (2004)
- The Witch's Sabbath (2005)
- Zombies Anonymous (2006)

Below is an incomplete selection of films currently distributed by Brain Damage Films.

- Traces of Death (1993)
- Traces of Death II (1994)
- Traces of Death III (1995)
- Immortal (1995)
- Executions II (1995)
- Traces of Death IV (1996)
- Shock-X-Treme, Vol. 1, - Snuff Video (1997)
- Schizophreniac: The Whore Mangler (1997)
- Paramedics (1997)
- Banned! In America (1998 - 2003)
- Impact 911 (2011)
- Traces of Death V: Back in Action (2000)
- The House That Screamed (2000)
- Wishbone (2000)
- Trees (2000)
- Zombie Chronicles (2001)
- Hip Hop Locos (2001)
- Hellgate: The House That Screamed 2 (2001)
- Fear of the Dark (2001)
- The Coven (2002)
- Hell's Highway (2002)
- Terror Toons (2002)
- Bikini Party Massacre (a.k.a. Joseph Clark's Massacre) (2002)
- Machine Head (2002)
- Toe Tags (2003)
- The Great American Snuff Film (2003)
- Operation Nazi Zombies (2003)
- Dr. Shock's Tales of Terror (2003)
- Blood Sisters (2003)
- Abomination: The Evilmaker II (2003)
- Necromaniac: Schizophreniac 2 (2003)
- Strange Things Happen at Sundown (2003)
- Addiction (2003)
- The Shunned House (2003)
- Vampire Sisters (2004)
- The Vulture's Eye (2004)
- Trees 2: The Root of All Evil (2004)
- Shadowhunters (2004)
- Suburban Sasquatch (2004)
- Drawing Blood (2005)
- Skyggen (2005)
- Swamp Zombies!!! (2005)
- Vampire Whores from Outer Space (2005)
- DeadHouse (2005)
- Silent Bloodnight (2006)
- Hell Hath No Fury (2006)
- Watch Me (2006)
- Cope (2007)
- Edgar Allen Poe's Darkness (2007)
- Chasing Darkness (2007)
- Being Michael Madsen (2007)
- Forever Dead (2007)
- Greetings (2007)
- The Terror Factor (2007)
- Caregiver (2007)
- The Expedition (2008)
- Attack of the Giant Leeches (2008)
- Johnny Sunshine Maximum Violence (2008)
- Taste of Flesh (2008)
- At the House of Madness (2008)
- Apocalypse Rising (2008)
- Skeleton Key 2: 667 Neighbor of the Beast (2008)
- O.C. Babes and the Slasher of Zombietown (2008)
- Caesar and Otto's Summer Camp Massacre (2009)
- Alice in Murderland (2010)
- Attack of the Vegan Zombies! (2010)
- The Midnight Disease (2010)
- Vampegeddon (2010)
- Wendigo: Bound by Blood (2010)
- Pop Punk Zombies (2011)
- Sinister (2011)
- 7 Nights of Darkness (2011)
- Skeleton Key 3: The Organ Trail (2011)
- The Tale of the Voodoo Prostitute (2012)
- Ridge War Z (2013)
- Arachnicide (2014)
- How to Kill a Zombie (2014)
- Horror House on Highway 6 (2014)
- Ghostlight (2014)
- Darkside Witches (2015)
- Misogynist (2015)
- The Conduit (2016)
- The Dooms Chapel Horror (2016)
- Scathing (2017)
