= Alice in Murderland =

Alice in Murderland may refer to:

- Alice in Murderland (manga), a Japanese manga series by Kaori Yuki that began in 2014
- Alice in Murderland (film), a 2010 American horror film
