= Unquiet Grave (disambiguation) =

Unquiet Grave may refer to:

- "The Unquiet Grave", an Irish/English folk song
- The Unquiet Grave (book), a book by Cyril Connolly
- The Unquiet Grave (anthology), an anthology of stories edited by August Derleth
- An Unquiet Grave, a horror-drama film
- Unquiet Graves, a documentary film
