= New York City Horror Film Festival =

- Location: New York City, New York, U.S.
- Founded: 2001
- Festival date: Annually; month of November
- Language: International
- Website: nychorrorfest.com

The New York City Horror Film Festival is an international film festival based in New York City that screens films from the horror genre. It was founded by Michael J. Hein in 2001. It takes place each year in New York City for a week in November.

The festival presents awards best feature film, shorts, cinematography, FX, actor and actress, screenplay, and audience choice. The festival also awards lifetime achievement awards recognizing the careers of horror filmmakers.

== Lifetime achievement award ==
Since 2002, the New York City Horror Film Festival has given the Lifetime Achievement Award to one legendary horror filmmaker each year. Recipients are as follows:

- 2016 - Adrienne Barbeau
- 2015 - Sean S. Cunningham
- 2014 - Angus Scrimm
- 2013 - Lloyd Kaufman
- 2012 - Wes Craven
- 2010 - Robert Englund
- 2009 - William Lustig
- 2008 - Frank Henenlotter
- 2007 - Herschell Gordon Lewis
- 2006 - Mick Garris
- 2005 - Roger Corman
- 2004 - Tobe Hooper
- 2003 - Tom Savini
- 2002 - George A. Romero

== Awards ==
=== 2013 ===
- Lifetime Achievement Award: Lloyd Kaufman
- MJH Award for Personal Achievement in Direction: Stuart Gordon
- Best Feature: Found
- Best Director: Joe Stauffer for Pieces of Talent
- Best Actor: Gavin Brown for Found
- Best Actress: Barbara Weetman for Pieces of Talent
- Best Screenplay: Pieces of Talent
- Best Cinematography: Pieces of Talent
- Best FX: Found
- Best Sound: Pinup Dolls on Ice…
- Best Short: Black Sugar
- Audience Choice Award: Evaded

=== 2012 ===
- Lifetime Achievement Award: Wes Craven
- MJH Award for Personal Achievement in Direction: Rob Zombie
- Best Feature: Gut by Elias
- Best Director: Greg Oliver for Devoured
- Best Actor: Lance Henriksen for It's In The Blood
- Best Actress: Marta Milans for Devoured
- Best Screenplay: It's In The Blood by Scooter Downey and Sean Elliot
- Best Cinematography: Mike Simpson for It's In The Blood
- Best FX: Josh Turi for Gut
- Best Short Film: Show Me by David Schneider
- Audience Choice Award: Sleepwalk by J.F. Morrison

=== 2010 ===
- Lifetime Achievement Award: Robert Englund
- Best Feature: YellowBrickRoad by Andy Mitton and Jesse Holland
- Best Director: Stevan Mena for Bereavement
- Best Actor: James Nesbitt for Outcast
- Best Actress: Emilie Dequenne for The Pack (La meute)
- Best Screenplay: Franck Richard for The Pack (La meute)
- Best Submitted Screenplay: "The Call of the Jersey Devil" by Aurelio Voltaire
- Best Cinematography: Marco Cappetta for Bereavement
- Best FX: Jenn Rose for Kiss The Abyss
- Best Short Film: Ninjas by Dennison Ramalho
- Audience Choice Award: The Living Want Me Dead by Bill Palmer
- Wizard World Award: Written By Karni Baghdikian

=== 2009 ===
- Best Feature - The Revenant
- Best Director - Kerry Prior, The Revenant
- Best Short - Eric Scherbarth, Sinkhole
- Best Actor - (Tie) David Anders and Chris Wylde, The Revenant
- Best Actress - Ellia English, Cornered
- Best Cinematography - Pier Luigi Santi, The Shadow Within
- Best Special Effects - Sweatshop
- Best Screenplay (submitted film) - Andreas Schaap, Must Love Death
- Best Screenplay - Vincent Ho and Stan Shaw, "Gargoyle"
- Audience Choice - The Revenant

=== 2008 ===
- Best Feature - Frank Henenlotter's Bad Biology
- Best Director - Jennifer Chambers Lynch, Surveillance
- Best Short - Nathan Bezner's Altar
- Best Cinematography - Stephanie Martin, The Objective
- Best Screenplay (submitted) - Jason Contino, "Remake"
- Best Screenplay for a Submitted Film - Nacho Vigalondo, Timecrimes
- Best Special Effects - Gabriel Bartalos, Bad Biology
- Best Actor - Dameon Clarke, How to Be a Serial Killer
- Best Actress - Ryan Simpkins, Surveillance
- Audience Choice Award: Short - Jason Eisener's Treevenge
- Audience Choice Award: Feature - Nacho Vigalondo's Timecrimes

=== 2007 ===
- Best Feature - Botched
- Best Short - Criticized
- Best Cinematography - Nobody
- Best Screenplay - Death of a Ghost Hunter
- Best Special Effects - Seed
- Best Actor - Stephen Dorff - Botched
- Best Actress - Masha Wattanapanich - Alone
- Audience Choice Award - DARA

=== 2006 ===
- Best Feature - Fingerprints
- Best Short - Happy Birthday To U
- Best Screenplay - Last Rites of the Dead
- Best Cinematography - The Marsh
- Best Special Effects - The Marsh
- Best Actor - Robert "Opal" Oppel - Rapturious
- Best Actress - Gina Ramsden - Last Rites of the Dead
- Audience Choice Award - Eddie Loves You

=== 2005 ===
- Best Feature - The Dark Hours
- Best Short - Zombie Movie
- Best Screenplay - Headspace
- Best Cinematography - Headspace
- Best Special Effects - Neighborhood Watch
- Best Actor - Jason Campbell - Nightmare
- Best Actress - Nicole Roderick - Nightmare
- Audience Choice Award - Roadkill

=== 2004 ===
- Best Feature - The Last Horror Movie
- Best Short - Herbie
- Best Screenplay - The Ghouls
- Best Cinematography - London Voodoo
- Best Special Effects - Cube Zero
- Best Actor - Kevin Howarth - The Last Horror Movie
- Audience Choice Award - Unwelcome

=== 2003 ===
- Best Feature - Malevolence
- Best Short - Scream for Me
- Best Cinematography - Flesh for the Beast
- Best Actor - Kristina Copeland Savage Island
- Best Special Effects - Flesh for the Beast
- Audience Choice Award - Strange Things Happen At Sundown

=== 2002 ===
- Best Feature - Lucky
- Best Short - Chuck
- Best Cinematography - Horror
- Best Actor - Den
- Best Special Effects - Hell's Highway
- Audience Choice - The Human Being

== Guests ==
=== 2008 ===
Frank Henenlotter William Lustig Michael Gingold

=== 2007 ===
- Eli Roth
- Herschell Gordon Lewis
- William Lustig
- Michael Gingold
- Frank Zagarino
- Roy Fumkis

=== 2006 ===
- Tony Todd was presented with a special award for "Excellence In Acting" in horror films
- Mick Garris was presented the Lifetime Achievement Award
- Ken Foree
- Betsy Palmer
- Michael Gingold
- Joe Kane
- William Lustig
- Jack Ketchum

=== 2005 ===
- Roger Corman, who received the Lifetime Achievement Award
- Don Coscarelli
- Angus Scrimm
- Michael Gingold
- Armand Mastroianni
- William Lustig

=== 2004 ===
- Tobe Hooper received the Lifetime Achievement Award
- Amanda Plummer
- Jeff Lieberman
- William Lustig
- Michael Gingold

=== 2003 ===
- Tom Savini received the Lifetime Achievement Award
- Lloyd Kaufman
- Joe Bob Briggs
- Michael Ruggerio

=== 2002 ===
- George A. Romero to receive the Lifetime Achievement Award
- Felissa Rose
- Lloyd Kaufman

== See also ==
- List of fantastic and horror film festivals
