= Roach motel =

Roach motel may mean:

- A low-priced motel or comparable lodging facility, usually a considerably older property in disrepair, not affiliated with a major chain, and located in a decaying area of town
- Roach Motel (1987 film), a 1987 British television film by Bryan Sinclair Morgan in the anthology series ScreenPlay Firsts
- Roach Motel, a device used to catch cockroaches
- Roach Motel, an alias of English electronic music duo Fire Island
- In computing, a type of dark pattern deceptive user interface
