= ScreenPlay Firsts =

- Country of origin: United Kingdom
- Original language: English

Original release
- Network: BBC Two
- Release: 17 August 1987 – 29 September 1993

ScreenPlay Firsts is a BBC Two anthology TV series consisting of short films and plays made by first time directors, who are predominantly British.

The filmmakers are mainly graduates of film schools in UK and abroad, who have never had one of their productions broadcast on TV before.

Each film is approximately 30 minutes in length.

The first film was broadcast on the 17 August 1987.

== Episodes ==
Series Number	Episode Number	Film Title	Director	Release date	Film School	Awards	Result
Series 1	Episode 1	Careless Talk	Noella Smith	17 August 1987	National Film School	BAFTA Award 1985 - Best Short Film	Won
Series 1	Episode 2	The Act	Chris Fallon	18 August 1987	Royal College of Art, School of Film and Television	Chicago International Film Festival 1986 - Gold Plaque for Best Short Film	Won
Series 1	Episode 3	See You At Wembley, Frankie Walsh	Mark Herman	19 August 1987	National Film School	Student Film Awards 1987 - Foreign Student Film	Won
Series 1	Episode 4	Roach Motel	Bryan Sinclair Morgan	20 August 1987	Royal College of Art		
Series 1	Episode 5	A View from a Window (Note: Also known as Mohammed's Daughter)	Suri Krishnamma	21 August 1987	Bournemouth and Poole College of Art and Design	BAFTA Award 1986 - Best Short Film	Nominated
Series 2	Episode 1	The Riveter	Michael Caton-Jones	6 September 1988	National Film School		
Series 2	Episode 2	Queen Sacrifice	Julian Richards	13 September 1988	Bournemouth and Poole College of Art and Design		
Series 2	Episode 3	Edward (Note: Also known as Edvard)	Justin Hardy	20 September 1988			
Series 2	Episode 4	Borderland	Teresa Moore	27 September 1988	National Film and Television School		
Series 2	Episode 5	Substance of Dreams	Tom Peirce	4 October 1988	Bournemouth and Poole College of Art and Design		
Series 2	Episode 6	Facts of Life	Laura Sims	11 October 1988	National Film and Television School		
Series 3	Episode 1	Sincerely, Harold Washington	Simon Howard	19 July 1989	London International Film School		
Series 4	Episode 1	Arrivederci Millwall	Charles McDougall	3 January 1990	National Film and Television School		
Series 4	Episode 2	The Unkindest Cut	Jim Shields	4 January 1990	National Film and Television School		
Series 4	Episode 3	The Audition	Anna Campion	11 January 1990			
Series 4	Episode 4	June	John Strickland	18 January 1990			
Series 4	Episode 5	False Profit	Mark Logan	25 January 1990	West Surrey College of Art and Design		
Series 4	Episode 6	Fotofinish	Sönke Wortmann	1 February 1990	Munich Film School		
Series 4	Episode 7	Looking after Number One	Simon Cellan Jones	6 February 1990			
Series 5	Episode 1	King of Jazz	Bill Anderson	17 July 1991	National Film and Television School		
Series 5	Episode 2	That Burning Question	Alan Taylor	24 July 1991	New York University		
Series 5	Episode 3	Jack's Bicycle	John Moore	31 July 1991	Rathmines College of Commerce		
Series 5	Episode 4	When I Was a Girl	David Yates	14 August 1991			
Series 5	Episode 5	Wendy	James Doyle & Matthew Leys	21 August 1991	Royal College of Art		
Series 5	Episode 6	Clubland	Laura Sims	28 August 1991			
Series 5	Episode 7	A Life in Death	Richard Monks	28 August 1991	Royal College of Art		
Series 5	Episode 8	Big Swinger	Declan Recks	4 September 1991	Don Laoghaire College of Art		
Series 5	Episode 9	Carmela Campo	Ariel Piluso	11 September 1991	National Film School		
Series 5	Episode 10	Sunday on Mars	David Hill	18 September 1991	National Film School		
Series 6	Episode 1	Saints and Scholars	Eamonn Manning	15 July 1992	Dun Laoghaire College of Art and Design		
Series 6	Episode 2	Siberian Summer	Andras Der	22 July 1992			
Series 6	Episode 3	Bossanova Blues	Eamonn Manning	29 July 1992	Royal College of Art		
Series 6	Episode 4	BitterSweet	Ute Krause	12 August 1992	Munich Television and Film School		
Series 6	Episode 5 (Part 1)	Resurrection	Ray Kilby	19 August 1992	Royal College of Art		
Series 6	Episode 5 (Part 2)	TuningIn	Elaine Streeter	19 August 1992	National Film and Television School		
Series 6	Episode 6	Through an Open Window	Eric Mendelsohn	26 August 1992			
Series 6	Episode 7	Supper at Emmaus	Frances Kelly	16 September 1992	National Film and TV School		
Series 7	Episode 1 (Part 1)	Schwarzfahrer (Note: Also known as Fare Dodger)	Pepe Danquart	6 September 1993			
Series 7	Episode 1 (Part 2)	The Burden	Naranhuar	6 September 1993			
Series 7	Episode 2	The Chanter	Jon Love	7 September 1993			
Series 7	Episode 3	The Miller's Tale	Ray Kilby	8 September 1993			
Series 7	Episode 4 (Part 1)	The Shoes	Nicholas Martin	9 September 1993			
Series 7	Episode 4 (Part 2)	Like/Dislike	Chris Boebel	9 September 1993			
Series 7	Episode 5 (Part 1)	Money Talks	Alrick Riley	10 September 1993			
Series 7	Episode 5 (Part 2)	The Waiter	Tania Diez	10 September 1993			
Series 7	Episode 6	Came Out, It Rained, Went Back In Again	Betsan Morns Evans	29 September 1993			
