= Hell's Highway (2002 film) =

- DVD released by Brain Damage Films
- Directed by: Jeff Leroy
- Written by: Jeff Leroy
- Produced by: David S. Sterling
- Starring: Kiren David; Ron Jeremy; Hank Horner; Joe Haggerty; Phoebe Dollar; Beverly Lynne; Jonathan Gray
- Cinematography: Jeff Leroy
- Edited by: Jeff Leroy
- Music by: Jay Woelfel
- Production company: Brain Damage Films
- Distributed by: Brain Damage Films
- Release date: January 12, 2002 (United States)
- Running time: 70 minutes
- Country: United States
- Language: English

Hell's Highway is a 2002 American supernatural slasher film written and directed by Jeff Leroy.

== Plot ==
Out on a highway in Death Valley, a man picks up a female hitchhiker named Lucindia (Phoebe Dollar), and gives her a drink. Lucindia has a coughing fit upon ingesting the liquid, stumbles out of the vehicle, and is stabbed to death by the motorist. The man (revealed to be a priest, whose offer to Lucindia was holy water) buries Lucindia's body, and erects a crucifix over the impromptu grave. As the preacher prays, Lucindia reappears, and bludgeons him with his shovel as he screams, "El Diablo!"

Nearby, four college students (Eric, Chris, Monique, and Sarah) from Western Pennsylvania are on a road trip to Redondo Beach. Spotting Lucindia at a cluster of crosses, the quartet pick her up. When Chris mentions that a group of their friends are also on their way to Redondo, Lucindia brags that she tortured them to death before pulling out a gun and sexually assaulting Sarah. Lucindia then tries to shoot Sarah in the crotch, but is knocked out of the car by her and Eric.

The next day, Lucindia (who had just robbed, castrated, and murdered a motorist) catches up with the college students, who run her down, beheading and disemboweling her. On what's left of Lucindia's body, Eric finds Chris's brother's cell phone, and a battery pack that fits into a camcorder that Sarah had earlier unearthed in the desert. The group watches the last few minutes recorded by the camera, which shows Lucindia shooting all of their friends during a botched séance. Lucindia then turns to the camera and tells the story of a settler couple that became trapped in the valley; to try and save his wife (implied to be Lucindia), the husband killed himself so that she could consume his flesh. Her husband's body was not enough to sustain her, and in her last dying hours the woman cursed God and prayed to the Devil for salvation, and received it in exchange for a steady stream of victims.

When the video ends, Lucindia appears, and attacks and mortally wounds Chris with a chainsaw. The students drive off, with Lucindia catching up to them when they run out of gas. Sarah, Eric, and Monique run, but are cornered by a pair of Lucindias, who murder Monique. Sarah accidentally kills Eric, then kills one of the Lucindias and is saved from the remaining one by two government operatives, who then capture Sarah.

Sarah is taken to a military installation, where it is explained that there were four equally delusional Lucindias and that they were the result of cloning and accelerated growth experiments. The staff tell Sarah that she is going to become their new test subject and as they try to give her an injection, a wounded Lucindia barges in. Sarah screams "I told you the Devil would come back!" as Lucindia opens fire with a shotgun, causing an explosion that presumably kills her and everyone else in the room.

== Cast ==
- Phoebe Dollar as Lucindia / Nurse Polonia
- Kiren David as Sarah McKinnis
- Hank Horner as Eric
- Beverly Lynne as Monique
- Jonathan Gray as Chris Struther
- Ron Jeremy as Jack
- Joe Haggerty as Preacher
- Garrett Clancy as Dr. Sullivan
- Brian C. Donnelly as Ralph Struther
- Jackie Johnson as Julie
- Jennifer Warren as Carla
- Natalie Pierre as Debra

== Reception ==
Joe Bob Briggs gave Hell's Highway a score of 2½ stars out of a possible 4, and wrote, "The acting is uneven, but the story does satisfy the first rule of drive-in movie-making: anybody can die at any moment. And you've gotta love a movie that has a sequence with porn legend Ron Jeremy as a bitter film producer who picks up the diabolical hitchhiker and is rewarded by getting disemboweled with a butcher knife while he's driving". Bruce Kooken of Horror News was highly critical of the film's twist ending, but still categorized Hell's Highway as "campy, funny and, without question, a blast" and summed up his closing thoughts regarding it with, "Just because I was disappointed with the ending doesn't mean there isn't plenty of entertaining aspects of the film".
