= Just a Gigolo (TV series) =

- Genre: Sitcom
- Starring: Tony Slattery
- No. of series: 1
- No. of episodes: 7

Production
- Production company: Central for ITV

Original release
- Release: 8 April – 20 May 1993

Just a Gigolo is a 1993 British sitcom made by Central for ITV starring Tony Slattery as Nick Brim, a teacher who must become a gigolo to pay for his house.

Other characters include his younger brother Simon (played by Paul Bigley) and Natalie, Nick's love interest, played by Rowena King.

== Cast ==
- Tony Slattery as Nick Brim
- Paul Bigley as Simon Brim
- Rowena King as Natalie
- Susan Denaker as Naomi
- Wanda Ventham as Marge Payne
