= Operation Nazi Zombies =

- Directed by: David B. Steart III
- Written by: David B. Steart III
- Produced by: Joseph De Christopher Snr
- Starring: Jon Osbeck
- Cinematography: Sean Hutcheon
- Edited by: David B. Steart III
- Music by: David B. Steart III
- Production company: Brain Damage Films
- Distributed by: Brain Damage Films
- Release date: August 13, 2003 (USA)
- Running time: 87 minutes
- Country: USA
- Language: English

Operation Nazi Zombies is an independently produced Nazi zombie film originally titled Maplewoods which was recorded in 1999 in Bucks County, Pennsylvania before being released in 2003.

== Plot ==
A special forces unit is sent on a mission to a research testing facility to fight the undead.

== Cast ==
- Thomas Reily as General Gibbs
- Elissa Mullen as Lieutenant Meyer
- Christopher Connolly as Chaplain Johnson
- John Weidemoyer as Mayor O'Malley

== Reception ==
Horrornews.net praised the film's special effects. Ain't It Cool News reviewed the film, stating that they "love productions like this because one can see that it is driven by a dedicated soul, doing a little bit of everything to make his dream happen. The end result is not perfect, but everyone involved seem to be giving it their all and a deep love of horror exudes from every frame."

== See also ==
- List of zombie Nazi films
