= Simona Brhlikova =

British actress

Simona Brhlikova, also known as Simona Roman
- Occupation: Actor
- Years active: 2004–present

Simona Brhlikova-Roman was born in former Czechoslovakia. From a young age, she appeared in several stage and musical productions.

Graduating from Commerce & Language Academy in Slovakia, Simona moved to London where she perfected her English at University College London, and trained at RADA and The Actors Centre. She also speaks seven languages. Simona left her family home at the age of 17 to travel North America and Africa before moving to London to pursue her acting career.

Simona first worked in theatre in London, in productions like Much Ado About Nothing, As You Like It, and Queen of Spades. This led to a string of independent films including a major role in Lycanthropy (2006), alongside George Calil and David Bradley, and then to television work on such shows as The IT Crowd, Life Begins, Footballers' Wives, Bad Girls and Casanova's Love Letters.

Moving onto international projects, Brhlikova landed the role of the villainess Kisscut in Gallowwalker starring opposite Wesley Snipes, and Maddoff: Made off with America about the infamous Ponzi schemer Bernie, playing mastermind "Ursula a.k.a. Mrs X". In 2013, Simona can be seen adding a touch of mystery and sophistication to Danny Dyer's Vendetta.

Simona now lives and works in London and Los Angeles.
