= Summer Scars =

- Film Poster
- Directed by: Julian Richards
- Written by: Julian Richards; Al Wilson
- Produced by: Julian Richards; Mike Tims
- Starring: Kevin Howarth; Ciaran Joyce; Amy Harvey; Darren Evans; Jonathan Jones; Chris Conway; Ryan Conway; Chole Parfitt
- Release date: 14 September 2007 (Oldenburg International Film Festival)
- Running time: 73 minutes
- Country: United Kingdom
- Language: English
- Budget: £135,000

Summer Scars is a 2007 British thriller film produced and directed by Julian Richards. It is based on a hostage situation that Richards experienced during his childhood. The cast includes Kevin Howarth, Ciaran Joyce, Amy Harvey, Darren Evans, Jonathan Jones, Chris Conway, Ryan Conway and Chole Parfitt.

== Plot ==
Six youths ditch school for the woods, where some hotrodding on a stolen moped changes the fate of their day. They crash into Peter, a dishevelled drifter, who is delighted to have a group of teens to hang out with. First he gains their trust by joining in their games, but then his behaviour changes. Peter uses what he has learned about the kids against them, bullying the alpha boys, belittling the weaker ones and saving his worst for the only girl in the group. Realising too late that they are being held hostage, the kids are forced to embrace the dark side of human nature in order to survive the ordeal.

== Cast ==
- Kevin Howarth as Peter
- Ciaran Joyce as Bingo
- Amy Harvey as Leanne
- Darren Evans as Jonesy
- Jonathan Jones as Paul
- Chris Conway as Ben
- Ryan Conway as Mugsey
- Chole Parfitt as Scott

== Release ==
The film had a limited UK theatrical release in 2009 by the Institute of Contemporary Arts (ICA) in their screening season for 'New British Cinema'. In 2008, Summer Scars was released on DVD in North America by TLA Releasing on their Danger After Dark label. In 2009, the film was released on DVD in the UK by Soda Pictures. Other DVD distributors include MIG Film GmbH (German speaking Europe), MCF Megacom (Former Yugoslavia), Wide Pictures (Spain), Sahamongkol Film International (Thailand) and Viswas (India).

== Reception ==
Rotten Tomatoes, a review aggregator, reports that 70% of ten surveyed critics gave the film a positive review; the average rating was 5.6/10. The site's consensus reads: "This low budget British psycho-thriller packs plenty of atmospheric tension and suspense into its slender running time." Summer Scars has been linked with other, roughly contemporaneous, films that deal with concerns over "Broken Britain" and a fear of "hoodies", including Harry Brown, Eden Lake, The Disappeared, Outlaw, The Great Ecstasy of Robert Carmichael and Heartless.

Kurt Dahlke of DVD Talk rated it 4/5 stars and called it "lean, mean, disturbing and deftly crafted". Josh Winning of Total Film rated it 3/5 stars and called it a "bare-boned tween nightmare" that is a combination of Stand by Me and Eden Lake. Nigel Floyd of Time Out London rated it 3/5 stars and wrote, "An inexperienced cast don't always make the most of a slippery, unsettling script". Andrew Pulver of The Guardian rated it 2/5 stars and wrote, "There's not much to recommend in this putative hoodie horror from Julian Richards, which takes the inverse position to Eden Lake."

=== Awards ===
Organization	Award	Recipient	Result	Year	Ref
BAFTA Cymru	Best Newcomer	Al Wilson	Won	2008	
BAFTA Cymru	Best Titles	Craig Wilkinson	Won	2008	
BAFTA Cymru	Best Film	Julian Richards	Nominated	2008	
Canada International Film Festival	Best Foreign Feature	Summer Scars	Won	2009	
London Independent Film Festival	Best Director	Julian Richards	Won	2008	
Fantastic Fest	Best Actor	Kevin Howarth	Won	2007	
