= Pop Punk Zombies =

- Directed by: Steve Dayton
- Screenplay by: Brian Leis
- Story by: Steve Dayton
- Produced by: Steve Dayton; Brian Leis
- Starring: Ian Kane; Nick Marinnuci; Laura Savage; Adam Hatfield
- Cinematography: Luke Gilbertson
- Edited by: Steve Dayton
- Music by: Tara Moulder
- Distributed by: Brain Damage Films
- Release date: January 10, 2011
- Running time: 84 minutes
- Country: United States
- Language: English

Pop Punk Zombies is a 2011 American horror film directed by Steve Dayton and written by Brian Leis. Adam Hatfield stars as a greedy manager who brings back a punk band as zombies.

== Plot ==
When the members of a punk band die, Dameon David, a greedy manager, brings them back to life again as zombies. David attempts to civilize the zombies as he manipulates them for his own benefit.

== Cast ==
- Ian Kane as Eddy Whitset
- Nic Marinucci as Ciezmore Jones
- Laura Savage as Lisa Corteen
- Adam Hatfield as Dameon David

== Production ==
Pop Punk Zombies was shot at The Warehouse, a local Wisconsin nightclub, in 2008 and 2009. The Disabled were recruited for the main theme.

== Release ==
The film was released direct-to-video by Brain Damage Films in 2011.

== Reception ==
Mark L. Miller of AICN said that the film "had a great idea" but the crew "lacked the skill or talent available to pull it off." HorrorSociety.com called the storyline "flawed and illogical" but said that the film had a fun concept.
