= Giro City =

1982 British TV film

Giro City is a 1982 British television drama film written and directed by Karl Francis. It stars Glenda Jackson, Jon Finch and Kenneth Colley. The film was released in the United States under the title And Nothing But the Truth in 1984.

== Plot ==
A team of reporters come up against censorship when they pursue a story.

== Cast ==
- Glenda Jackson as Sophie
- Jon Finch as O'Mally
- Kenneth Colley as Martin
- James Donnelly as James
- Karen Archer as Brigitte
- Graham Berry as TV10 Cameraman
- Chris Renty as TV10 Soundman
- David Quilter as TV10 Lawyer
- Peter Halliday as Government Minister
- Simon Coady as Awards Compere
- Emrys James as Tommy Williams
- Simon Jones as Henderson
- Michael Lees as GNH Chairman
- Bruce Alexander as GNH Lawyer
- David Beames as Joe
- Sharon Morgan as Social Worker

== Production ==
The budget was £441,000.
