= Queen Sacrifice (film) =

Queen Sacrifice is a 30-minute short film written and directed by Julian Richards in 1988 whilst he was a film student at Bournemouth and Poole College of Art and Design and is based on his childhood experience as a school boy chess champion.

The cast includes Richard Davies, Duane Phillips, Lisa Climie and the music was composed by Julian Nott.

The 16mm short was filmed on location in Trehafod in the Rhondda Valley and in Bournemouth.

== Synopsis ==
Davey, a talented young chess player and Wil Bevan, his history teacher are in Bournemouth for the British Chess Championships. When Davey meets up with Helen, a punk girl from London, Wil is faced with the problem of steering his charge through the championship and the trauma of first love.

== Awards ==
Thames Television Award for Best Fiction Film at The BP Expo - British Short Film Festival 1990

ZDF Award for Best Film at Munich International Student Film Festival 1989

Award Of Excellence at Tel Aviv Student Film Festival 1989

Silver Plaque at Chicago International Film Festival 1988

Golden Knight for Best Film at Valletta International Film Festival 1991

Certificate of Merit at Cork Film Festival 1989

Special Jury Commendation, Celtic Media Festival 1988

== Distribution ==
Queen Sacrifice was broadcast by the BBC in Screenplay Firsts a drama series for debut film-makers. Queen Sacrifice was also broadcast by the BBC in Scene, a drama series for schools and colleges. Other broadcasts include ZDF in Germany and ITV in Wales. Queen Sacrifice is also available as added value on the German DVD release of The Last Horror Movie.
