= Adrian Rigelsford =

British writer (born 1969)

Adrian Rigelsford (born 1969, in Cambridge) is a British writer and TV historian, most affiliated with Doctor Who. His work has been subject to controversies over inaccuracies and theft. In June 2004, he was convicted of stealing photographs from the Daily Mail / Associated Newspapers archive in Kensington.

== Writing career ==
Rigelsford has written several articles and books on TV and film history. Among them were ghost written biographies of Peter Sellers and Brian Blessed.

In 1993, he wrote the script for The Dark Dimension, a proposed 30th anniversary Doctor Who special. BBC Enterprises supported the project and it was scheduled as a "straight-to-video" project, despite its very low budget. The project eventually earned the backing of BBC1 Controller Alan Yentob, who agreed to invest in it and show the programme on BBC1. However, the programme folded after 5 weeks of pre-production. He would return to scripting television again on the 1998 sci-fi series Space Island One.

In 2004, Big Finish Productions produced the Rigelsford-written The Roof of the World as part of their main range Doctor Who audio plays. It starred Peter Davison as the Fifth Doctor. He was attached to write for the Lethbridge Stewart spin-off books, before being dropped quietly. He did contribute to the screenplay for the 2012 horror film The Seasoning House.

In 2026, it was discovered that Rigelsford had been writing for several years under the pseudonym Tom Dexter, allowing him to covertly continue his association with the Lethbridge Stewart range and other Doctor Who spin-off media.

== Controversies ==
The accuracy of Rigelsford's reference work has been heavily disputed. He was accused of unsourced and previously unheard-of quotes from William Hartnell, as well as the omission of an entire season from one of his Doctor Who reference works.

Later, a publication in TV Times of a "final" interview with director Stanley Kubrick brought Rigelsford to the attention of Anthony Frewin, a friend of Kubrick's. Frewin's investigation uncovered that a supposed tape of the Kubrick interview did not exist. In the light of this and Frewin's expert doubts, TV Times ran an apology about the interview.

In June 2004, Rigelsford was convicted of stealing 56,000 photographs from the Daily Mail/Associated Newspapers research library over an eight-year period and reselling them for approximately £75,000. Rigelsford was sentenced to eighteen months imprisonment.
