= Rowena King =

British actress

- Born: Rowena King; London, England
- Education: Mountview Academy of Theatre Arts
- Occupation: Actress
- Years active: 1991–present

Rowena King is a British stage, film and television actress.

== Early life and education ==
Rowena King was born in London to Phyllis Ndhlandhla from Soweto, South Africa, and British-born John King, an entrepreneur and designer. She spent her childhood with her parents and three older sisters in Hertfordshire.

She attended formal dramatic studies at the Mountview Academy of Theatre Arts, from where she transitioned to ensemble work with the Royal Shakespeare Company.

== Career ==
King first appeared in the 1991 drama London Kills Me. She had recurring roles in a number of UK television series such as Framed, Screen One, Full Stretch, Just a Gigolo, To Play the King, Tales of the South Seas and Wonderful You.

King is known to the British public for her portrayal of Amelie in Wide Sargasso Sea, the 1993 film adaptation, directed by John Duigan, of Jean Rhys's 1966 novel of the same name; and as Rachel Morris in director Julian Richards' 1996 horror film Darklands. Her role as "attendant to Gertrude" in Kenneth Branagh's four-hour screen version of Hamlet drew on King's Shakespearean background, but provided her with relatively little screen time.

In 2006 she had a secondary role as Heather in Peter Levin's A Perfect Day, starring Rob Lowe and Christopher Lloyd. In 2007 she appeared as Angelica in Rob Reiner's The Bucket List with Morgan Freeman and Jack Nicholson. King's television credits include guest roles in Grey's Anatomy, Eli Stone, The All New Alexei Sayle Show, Nip/Tuck, Lie to Me, Death in Paradise, among others; and recurring roles in Breaking News, Half & Half, and The Wrong Mans.

In 2015/16 King played a supporting role in 8 episodes of the ABC television drama series Of Kings and Prophets, based on the Books of Samuel. The series follows an ensemble of characters including Saul and David, the successive Kings of Israel, their families, and their political rivals.

== Filmography ==
=== Film ===
Year	Title	Role	Notes
1991	London Kills Me	Melanie	
1993	Wide Sargasso Sea	Amelie	
1995	The Turnaround	Fiona	
1996	Darklands	Rachel Morris	
1996	Hamlet	Attendant to Gertrude	
1997	My Son the Fanatic	Margot	
1997	So This Is Romance?	Moira	
2000	Proof of Life	Pamela	
2002	Today I Vote for My Joey	Maryse	
2007	The Bucket List	Angelica	
20??	Sexual Healing	Marilyn	Announced

=== Television ===
Year	Title	Role	Notes
1992	Sam Saturday	Sandra Morrisey	"On the Other Hand"
1992	Framed	Charlotte Lampton	TV miniseries
1992	A Touch of Frost	Julia King	"Conclusions"
1992	Screen One	Roberta Ford	"Black and Blue"
1993	Full Stretch	Tessa Knowles	TV series
1993	Just a Gigolo	Natalie	"1.1", "1.2", "1.3"
1993	Vicious Circle	Celia	TV film
1993	To Play the King	Chloe Carmichael	TV miniseries
1994	Screen One	Mariella	"Two Golden Balls"
1998–2000	Tales of the South Seas	Lavinia Timoto	Main role
1999	Wonderful You	Laura Kennett	TV miniseries
2002	Breaking News	Jamie Templeton	Main role
2003	Fastlane	Adriana	"Overkill"
2003	The Lyon's Den	Robyn Petrie Nwamaka	"Pilot"
2003–04	Half & Half	Camille	Recurring role
2004	Las Vegas	Vita Brighton	"Games People Play"
2004	Dr. Vegas	Marta	"Lust for Life"
2005	Alias	Pierpont	"Mockingbird"
2006	A Perfect Day	Heather	TV film
2007	Grey's Anatomy	Celeste Newman	"Desire"
2007	Futureshock: Comet	Kimberly Marshall	TV film
2008	Eli Stone	Holly Rains	"Something to Save"
2009	Criminal Minds	Det. Benning	"To Hell... And Back"
2009	Revolution	Gov. Olivia Agee	TV film
2010	Numb3rs	Elizabeth Hopkins	"And the Winner Is..."
2010	Nip/Tuck	Jill Jacobson	"Christian Troy II"
2010	Lie to Me	Helen Dezekis	"Beat the Devil"
2013	Midsomer Murders	Wendy Robson	"The Sicilian Defence"
2013	Death in Paradise	Sister Marguerite	"2.2"
2013	By Any Means	DI Bates	"1.4"
2013	The Wrong Mans	Wood	"Inside Mans", "Wanted Mans", "Running Mans"
2014	Edge of Heaven	Janelle	"1.5"
2015	NCIS: Los Angeles	Dr. Camille Rivers	"Field of Fire"
2016	Of Kings and Prophets	Zaphra	Main role
2017	Shut Eye	Maggie Sexton-Templesmith	"Charles the Magnificent", "Crimes and Punishments", "Purple Hearts"
2017	Trauma	Lisa	TV miniseries, post-production
2018	Dietland	Cheryl Crane-Murphy	Series Regular – AMC
2019	Agent Hamilton	Haig	Recurring - Amazon / Dramacorp
2019	Emergence	Helen & Loretta	Recurring
2020	The Wilds	Alice	Guest Star in Episode 108
2022	Grantchester	Edith Larsen	ITV
2022	DI Ray	Maureen Groves	ITV
2022	The Old Man	Nina Kruger	Recurring - FX
2022	Foundation	Kalle	Recurring - Apple TV+
