= Virtual World (novel) =

1996 novel by Chris Westwood

- Author: Chris Westwood
- Cover artist: Diane Fenster
- Language: English
- Genre: Young adult
- Publisher: Viking Penguin
- Publication date: 1996
- Publication place: United Kingdom
- Media type: Print (hardback)
- Pages: 182pp
- ISBN: 0-670-86287-8

Virtual World is the sixth young adult novel by the English writer Chris Westwood. It was published in the UK (1996) and in the US (1997) by Viking Penguin. It was long-listed for the Carnegie Medal in 1997.
