= A Perfect Day (2006 film) =

- Based on: A Perfect Day by Richard Paul Evans
- Screenplay by: Joyce Eliason
- Directed by: Peter Levin
- Starring: Rob Lowe; Frances Conroy; Paget Brewster; Christopher Lloyd; Jude Ciccolella; Rowena King
- Composer: Jeff Beal
- Country of origin: United States
- Original language: English

Production
- Producer: Judy Cairo
- Cinematography: Kees Van Oostrum
- Running time: 87 minutes
- Production companies: Magna Global Entertainment; Stephanie Germain Productions

Original release
- Network: TNT
- Release: December 18, 2006

A Perfect Day is a 2006 American made-for-television drama film directed by Peter Levin and written by Joyce Eliason. It is based on the 2003 novel A Perfect Day by Richard Paul Evans. The film stars Rob Lowe, Frances Conroy, Paget Brewster, Christopher Lloyd, Jude Ciccolella and Rowena King. The film premiered on TNT on December 18, 2006.

== Plot ==
Rob is a man who lives a miserable life made of sacrifices with his family. The turning point comes when he finally decides to publish a book inspired by the moving experience of his father-in-law's death. Though the book is initially not successful, later Rob travels around the world submerged by important conferences and meetings with curious readers and authors. This leads him to put his loved ones in the background and to separate from his wife. An elderly gentleman points out to him what he is losing, foreseeing his near death. The film ends with a happy ending, with Rob reunited with his wife and daughter.

== Casts ==
- Rob Lowe as Rob Harlan
- Frances Conroy as Camille
- Paget Brewster as Allyson Harlan
- Christopher Lloyd as Michael
- Jude Ciccolella as Chuck
- Rowena King as Heather
- Kevin Dunn as Darren
- Meggie Geisland as Carson Harlan
- Mike Pniewski as Stuart Parks
- Damon Lipari as Stan Harlan
- Candi Brooks as Stacey
- Lauren Fain as Marla
- Michael Arata as Concerned Man
- Jerry Leggio as Old Man
- Janet Shea as Aunt Denise
- Lara Grice as Reporter #1
- John Valdetero as Ted Sterling
- Larry King as Himself
