= Kevin Howarth =

British film actor

- Born: Coventry, England
- Occupation: Actor
- Years active: 1998–present

Kevin Howarth is a British film actor, known for his roles as Max in The Last Horror Movie, Peter in Summer Scars and Viktor in The Seasoning House.

== Career ==
Howarth attended the Webber Douglas Academy of Dramatic Art in London, from which he graduated with distinction.

== Filmography ==
- Cash in Hand (1998) – Ripper
- The Big Swap (1998) – Julian
- Razor Blade Smile (1998) – Platinum
- Last Orders (short) (2000)
- The Ghost of Greville Lodge (2000) – Billyboy
- Whacked (short) (2002) – Karl Ryan
- Don't Look Back (2003) – The Stranger
- The Last Horror Movie (2003) – Max Parry
- The Lord of the Rings: The Return of the King (2003) – character voices
- Cold and Dark (2005) – Mortimer Shade
- Summer Scars (2007) – Peter
- Burlesque Fairytales (2010) – Jimmy Harrison
- Two Peas (short) (2010) – Mary's Father
- Brave (2012) – character voices
- Gallowwalkers (2012) – Kansa
- The Seasoning House (2012) – Viktor
- The Magnificent Eleven (2013) – Vince

== Television ==
- The First Olympian (2004)
- If... (TV series) Series 2 Episode 3: If...Drugs Were Legal (2005) – Daniel Kandinski
- Revealed – The Captain Bligh Conspiracy (2007) – James Morrison

== Video games ==
- Wipeout Pure (2005) – Lead Male Voice
- Spartan: Total Warrior (2005) – Tiberius
- Anno 1701 (2006) – Various character voices
- Clive Barker's Jericho (2007) – Additional character voices
- The Witcher (video game) (2007) – Temerian Soldier/Rich Youth (English version)
- Wipeout Pulse (2007) – Lead Male Voice
- Rhodan: Myth of the Illochim (2008) – Ara Mediker Eol Toregent
- Memento Mori (video game) (2008)
- Anno: Create A New World (2009) – William Riley
- Trine (2009) – Amadeus the Wizard
- Venetica (2009) – Voice (English version)
- Trine 2 (2011) – Amadeus the Wizard
- Jack Keane 2: The Fire Within (2013) – Umbati
- The Raven (video game) (2013) – David Kreutzer (English version)
- The Wolf Among Us (2013–2014) – Georgie Porgie
- Risen 3: Titan Lords (2014) – Character voice
- Trine 3: The Artifacts of Power (2015) – Amadeus the Wizard
- Trine 4: The Nightmare Prince (2019) – Amadeus the Wizard
- Elden Ring (2022) – Alexander

== Awards ==
- 2004 Won Best Actor – New York City Horror Film Festival (The Last Horror Movie)
- 2004 Won Best Actor – Buenos Aires Rojo Sangre International Film Festival (The Last Horror Movie)
- 2004 Won Best Actor – Eerie Horror Film Festival (The Last Horror Movie)
- 2007 Won Best Actor – Montevideo Fantastico Film Festival (The Last Horror Movie)
- 2007 Won Best Actor – Austin Fantastic Film Festival (Summer Scars)
- 2015 Nominated for Best Vocal Ensemble in a Video Game – "BTVA Video Game Voice Acting Award" (The Wolf Among Us)
