= The Great American Snuff Film =

- Directed by: Sean Tretta
- Written by: Sean Tretta
- Starring: Mike Marsh; Ryan Hutman; Melinda Lorenz; Holi Tavernier; Jason Dinger; Melanie Trimble; April Hinojosa
- Cinematography: Sean Tretta
- Edited by: Sean Tretta
- Music by: Ryan Hutman
- Production company: Ominous Productions
- Distributed by: Brain Damage Films
- Release date: 2003
- Running time: 87 minutes
- Country: United States
- Language: English

The Great American Snuff Film is a 2003 American horror film directed by Sean Tretta. Purporting to be real footage taken by a pair of serial killers, the film follows two young women who have been kidnapped and are being forced to star in a snuff film. The film is shown in a mix of third-person view and found footage-style. In 2010, the film was followed by a sequel titled The Greatest American Snuff Film.

== Cast ==
- Mike Marsh as William Allen Grone
- Ryan Hutman as Roy
- Melinda Lorenz as Patti
- Holi Tavernier as Sarah
- Jason Dinger as Chuck
- Melanie Trimble
- April Hinojosa
- Jeff Tretta as David
- Kierra Bowden
- Andrea Villa
