= A Light in the Black =

1989 novel by Chris Westwood

- First edition
- Author: Chris Westwood
- Cover artist: Sophie Williams
- Language: English
- Genre: Young adult
- Publisher: Penguin Books
- Publication date: 1989
- Publication place: United Kingdom
- Media type: Print (Hardback)
- Pages: 208pp
- ISBN: 978-0-670-82726-8

A Light in the Black is the first novel by Chris Westwood, a British author of children's and young adult fiction. It was first published in the UK in 1989 by Viking Kestrel (part of the Penguin Group) and in the US in 1991 by HarperCollins Children's Books. Listed in Children's Books Of Year 1990 (ISBN 978-0-86264-307-2. Andersen Press) and short-listed for the Guardian Children's Fiction Prize 1990.

== Reviews ==
Michael Baldwin, The Guardian: In Chris Westwood's A Light in the Black (Kestrel) a hypnotic stranger drops into town and the locals begin to drop out. Is Mr Stands a zombie, an alien, or just extremely odd? The plot may be as old as the Pied Piper of Hamelin, but the writer is extraordinarily — no, paranormally — compelling, and gives off a very sinister glitter.
