= Strange Things Happen at Sundown =

2003 comedy horror film

Strange Things Happen at Sundown is a 2003 comedy horror film, directed by Marc Fratto, produced by Insane-o-rama Productions and distributed by Brain Damage Films. It stars J. Scott Green, Masha Sparon and Jocasta Bryan. The film won the audience choice award at the 2003 New York City Horror Film Festival and has received generally favorable reviews. Film Threat called it "a wickedly funny take on the vampire genre".

The film's plot centers on the lives of a handful of New York vampires, interwoven together, and clashing in a violent finale.

== See also ==
- Vampire film
