= The Seasoning House =

- Directed by: Paul Hyett
- Written by: Paul Hyett; Conal Palmer; Adrian Rigelsford
- Based on: an original idea by Helen Solomon
- Produced by: Michael Riley
- Starring: Rosie Day; Kevin Howarth; Sean Pertwee; Anna Walton; Jemma Powell
- Cinematography: Adam Etherington
- Edited by: Agnieszka Liggett
- Music by: Paul E. Francisco
- Production company: Sterling Pictures
- Distributed by: Kaleidoscope Film Distribution
- Release date: 23 August 2012
- Running time: 90 mins
- Country: United Kingdom
- Language: English

The Seasoning House is a 2012 British horror film directed by Paul Hyett. It was his directorial debut and stars Rosie Day, Kevin Howarth and Sean Pertwee.

== Synopsis ==
Angel is a young girl who is forced to work in a house that specializes in supplying kidnapped women forced into the sex trade to various military personnel. Initially planned to be put to work as an unwilling sex slave, Angel, a young deaf girl with an "unattractive" birth mark on her face, instead becomes the assistant to Viktor, who runs the brothel. During the day, she is given the duty of putting makeup on the kidnapped women and drugging them. After they have been violently raped by various men, Angel has the duty of cleaning them up.

At night, Angel wanders the walls and crawlspaces of the house, which is when she befriends newcomer Vanya who understands sign language. The squad that brought in Angel comes for a visit. The commander, Goran, brings his squad into the brothel, including his beloved brother, Josif, and another soldier, Ivan. Angel crawls through the vents from her room to Vanya's room and sees Vanya being raped by Ivan. When Ivan kills Vanya, Angel uses a knife to attack and kill him. The shuffling noises inside the room alert Goran, Viktor, and the rest of the squad who come to find Ivan and Vanya dead, with Angel gone. The rest of the men start looking for Angel. Goran sends one of his men into the vents, but Angel is able to outmaneuver and kill him. Viktor kills one of Goran's men because he has been losing so many women from the brutal rapes.

Angel escapes the house and runs into a nearby forest. As Goran, Josif and Viktor start looking for her, Angel sees all the dead women decomposing in the forest. Viktor catches up to Angel and convinces her that he isn't going to harm her, and she gives up the knife. Viktor, being caught by Goran and Josif, offers Angel in exchange for their mercy. The three men are at a standstill with their weapons drawn with Viktor using Angel as a human shield. Viktor convinces Goran and Josif to call a truce by offering half of his profits. As the men slowly put down their weapons, Angel grabs the knife from Viktor's belt and stabs him in the foot causing him to inadvertently shoot Josif. Goran is enraged and shoots Viktor. Josif then dies and Goran kills Viktor by shooting him several times.

Angel escapes to a woman's house, but soon realizes the woman is Ivan's wife, Lexi. After Lexi gets a call from Goran and hears the tragic news of Josif, she unsuccessfully attempts to kill Angel. Angel kills her and starts running to the nearest factory. Goran catches up and they start climbing the tubes. When Goran gets stuck, Angel stuffs his mouth with a rag so he would be unable to speak or call for help. Angel proceeds out of the tube leaving Goran behind to suffocate. Finally free, Angel runs to the nearest house and is helped by an elderly couple. It is the doctor's house which Viktor calls for help regarding his girls.

== Cast ==
- Rosie Day as Angel
- Kevin Howarth as Viktor
- Sean Pertwee as Goran
- Anna Walton as Violeta
- Jemma Powell as Alexa
- David Lemberg as Dimitri
- Amanda Wass as Arijana
- Sean Cronin as Branimar
- Tomi May as Aleksander
- Emma Britton as Samira
- Emily Tucker as Nina
- Katy Allen as Tatjana
- Thomas Worthington as Vinko
- Gina Abolins as Jasmina
- Dominique Provost-Chalkley as Vanya
- Fabiano De Souza Ramos as Dragan
- Christopher Rithin as Danijel
- Rachel Waring as Emilia
- Laurence Saunders as Stevan
- Tommie Grabiec as Ratko
- Philip Anthony as Dr. Andre
- Alec Utgoff as Josif
- Ryan Oliva as Ivan
- Daniel Vivian as Radovan
- James Bartlett as Marko
- Adrian Bouchet as Branko
- Eddie Oswald as Boiler Room Thug
- Abigail Hamilton as Marisa

== Production ==
Filming for the movie began in January 2012 at a disused air force base in London. Stuart Bailey and Paul Blackwell appear in uncredited cameos.

== Reception ==
The film received negative reviews. It holds a 21% rating on Rotten Tomatoes, based on reviews from 14 critics. Empire said: "Stylistically bold and brutally compelling. It also handles its delicate subject more carefully than you might imagine from a brief synopsis". Starburst said: "The film is just powerful and gut-churning enough to leave a lasting impression and one of the strongest directorial debuts of recent times. Boasting a remarkable performance from young Rosie Day, the film is very different from your typical British genre picture and is a refreshing change from endless zombie films or movies about hooded violent teenagers". Dread Central said: "Hyett’s direction is measured, confident, and darkly poetic throughout, weaving an emotional web of tenderness amidst hopelessness and abuse. The Seasoning House is a lyrical, bleak, and deeply wounding exploration of brutality and inhumanity that cries out to be seen". Bloody Disgusting wrote: "What makes The Seasoning House stand out is that everything about it is simple and done in a way that just results in the proper definition of art".

Time Out London criticized what they saw as a "failure to blend the raw sexual violence and social comment with more familiar generic tropes" and the "downbeat switchback ending" that they felt was "neither convincing nor earned.". The Guardian also panned the film, as they felt that the depictions of human monsters were "cardboard" and did not feel genuine.

== Awards ==
- Best Actress at Screamfest LA – Rosie Day
