= Brother of Mine =

Book by Chris Westwood

1994 Penguin edition

Brother of Mine is the fourth young adult novel by English writer Chris Westwood. It was first published in the UK by Viking Kestrel (part of the Penguin Group and in the US by Clarion Books in 1994.
