= Charles Dickens's England =

- Directed by: Julian Richards
- Written by: David Nicholas Wilkinson
- Produced by: David Nicholas Wilkinson
- Narrated by: Derek Jacobi
- Release date: 2009
- Country: United Kingdom

Charles Dickens's England is a feature documentary written and produced by David Nicholas Wilkinson, directed by Julian Richards and presented by Derek Jacobi. Other participants include Roy Hattersley, Adrian Wootton, Tony Williams, Thelma Grove, Lee Ault and Tony Pointon.

== Synopsis ==
Charles Dickens's England takes the viewer on a journey of important places, towns and cities that were the inspiration to some of the most famous settings in literature; Cooling Church in Kent used by Dickens in the opening chapter of Great Expectations; Miss Havisham’s house in Rochester; the London Roman Baths used by David Copperfield; Joe Gargery’s cottage in Chalk; the notorious Bowes Academy, the harshest of the Yorkshire schools now known to the world as Dotheboys Hall in Nicholas Nickleby.

Over 100 locations are featured including from Portsmouth to the Isle of Wight, numerous London locations, from Chatham to Broadstairs, to Folkestone, to Barnard Castle, and to St George's Hall in Liverpool. Many of the locations, such as the interior of 58 Lincoln's Inn Fields, where Dickens first read in public, the All the Year Round offices in Covent Garden where he lived and worked, and Gads Hill Place in Kent, are not open to the public and have rarely been filmed.

== Theatrical Release ==
In 2009, Charles Dickens's England was released in UK cinemas by Guerilla Films.

== DVD release ==
In 2009, an extended version of Charles Dickens's England was released on DVD in the UK by Guerilla Films.

In October 2009, Charles Dickens's England was broadcast in the UK by Sky Television on their channel Sky Arts.

== Critical reaction ==
Reviews of the film were largely mixed to negative, earning it a 25% fresh rating on Rotten Tomatoes.

Mark Kermode called it a "waste (of) two hours of my life...". Critics derided the uncinematic quality of the filmmaking and the ineptitude of Jacobi as a presenter.

The Financial Times wrote: "Thank goodness for Charles Dickens's England...endearing Dickensian innocence". Empire magazine wrote "decidedly charming documentary".
