= Gallowwalkers =

2012 film

- Official DVD cover
- Directed by: Andrew Goth
- Written by: Andrew Goth; Joanne Reay
- Produced by: Alex Avant; Michael Gebauer; Joanne Reay
- Starring: Wesley Snipes; Kevin Howarth; Riley Smith; Tanit Phoenix; Patrick Bergin; Diamond Dallas Page
- Cinematography: Henner Hofmann
- Edited by: Rudolf Buitendach
- Music by: Stephen Warbeck
- Production companies: Summit Entertainment; Boundless Pictures; Jack Bowyer Productions
- Distributed by: Intandem Films; Lionsgate; Vantage Media International; Wrekin Hill Entertainment
- Release dates: October 27, 2012 (Film4 FrightFest); August 6, 2013 (Direct-to-DVD)
- Running time: 90 minutes
- Country: United States
- Language: English
- Budget: $17 million

Gallowwalkers is a 2012 American horror Western film written and directed by Andrew Goth, and starring Wesley Snipes, Kevin Howarth, Riley Smith, Tanit Phoenix, Patrick Bergin, and Diamond Dallas Page. Due to Wesley Snipes' tax problems, the film went through many changes and delays and was completed in 2010. It still had no official release until a 2012 screening at the "Film4 FrightFest" festival in the United Kingdom. It was released on DVD and Blu-ray in the United States in 2013, nearly eight years after the film started production in 2006.

== Plot ==
A group of disfigured people gather near a railroad in a desert where they are killed by a mysterious gunslinger named Aman (Wesley Snipes), who rips out the head and spine from one of the dead bodies.

Nearby in the same desert, a group of criminals are waiting to be transported. Aman arrives, kills most of the guards, and frees one criminal called Fabulos (Riley Smith). The rest of the criminals are transported to a small settlement where they are supposed to be hanged. Just as they arrive, the settlement is attacked by a bizarre gang led by a skinless man named Kansa (Kevin Howarth), who slaughters most of the inhabitants.

Through flashbacks, it is revealed that the same gang of outlaws once raped Aman's lover. Aman attacked the group and brutally killed them while they were imprisoned and defenseless. While running away, Aman is killed. His mother, who is a nun, breaks her covenant with God and sacrifices herself to save him, which places a curse on him for life. The curse brings all the people killed by Aman back to life, so all the gang members that Aman had killed return as undead to seek revenge, except for Kansa's son who remained dead. The undead lose their skin after a week, so they remove the skins from the people they kill to use as replacements. The only way the undead can be killed is by destroying their brains.

While Aman and Fabulos are visiting a woman and child, part of the undead gang attacks. But the four manage to kill all the attackers. However, Fabulos is severely wounded, so Aman kills him in order for him to come back as undead.

Kansa, who has put on a new skin, and his remaining two undead followers arrive at a secret temple with the beautiful Angel (Tanit Phoenix) whom they take hostage back in the settlement. Kansa believes that inside the temple they will find a way to resurrect his dead son, but this proves to be false. Aman and the undead Fabulos soon catch up with them, and Aman kills Kansa and his followers. While Aman is leaving with Kansa's head in his hand, Angel seductively approaches Fabulos.

== Cast ==
- Wesley Snipes as Aman
- Kevin Howarth as Kansa
- Riley Smith as Fabulos
- Tanit Phoenix as Angel
- Patrick Bergin as Marshall Gaza
- Steven Elder as Apollo Jones (Priest)
- Diamond Dallas Page as Skullbucket
- Jenny Gago as Mistress
- Simona Brhlikova as Kisscut
- Alyssa Pridham as Sueno
- Alex Avant as Forty Bold
- Hector Hank as Hool
- Jonathan García as Slip Knot

== Production ==
=== Development ===
The film first came to general attention in 2005 as The Wretched with actor Chow Yun-fat set to star as zombie bounty hunter Rellik.

The filming in Namibia coincided with Wesley Snipes' tax problems. The backer, Gary Smith, had ensured there was a completion bond as backup, but Smith declared, "We are happy that he continues to turn up on set each day. If his indictment creates this amount of press it shows he is a star."

In a 2014 interview with Empire Snipes called the film an "absolute disaster".

== Release ==
=== Home media ===
Lionsgate Home Entertainment released Gallowwalkers on DVD in Region 1, digital download, and video on demand on August 6, 2013.

== Reception ==
=== Critical response ===
Scott Foy of Dread Central rated it 1/5 stars and wrote, "If you've seen the trailer for Gallowwalkers, then not only have you seen pretty much all the best parts, you've actually seen a more lucid version of the movie than the film itself." Scott Weinberg of Fearnet wrote, "It would take a team of veteran film critics working around the clock to catalog all the things that are wrong with this outrageously goofy movie [...] GallowWalkers is funnier by accident than Adam Sandler is on purpose." Olie Coen of DVD Talk rated it 1.5/5 stars and wrote, "I can't recommend this movie to anyone, unless you just want to see Snipes pretending he's a cowboy." Andrew Dowler of Now wrote, "With some okay action and spectacular scenery, Gallowwalkers starts strong, sags in the middle, suffers from some narrative incoherence and comes back for a decent finish."
