= The Vulture's Eye =

- DVD cover
- Directed by: Frank Sciurba
- Written by: Frank Sciurba
- Produced by: Frank Sciurba; Tom Basham; Diane Park
- Starring: Anne Flosnik; Fred Iacovo; Jason King; James Nalitz; Brooke Paller; Joseph Reo
- Edited by: Frank Sciurba
- Music by: Christopher Sciurba
- Distributed by: Brain Damage Films
- Release date: September 3, 2004
- Running time: 100 minutes
- Country: United States
- Language: English

The Vulture's Eye is a 2004 horror film directed by Frank Sciurba and starring Anne Flosnik, Fred Iacovo, Jason King, James Nalitz, Brooke Paller, and Joseph Reo. Inspired by Bram Stoker's novel Dracula, it is set in Virginia.

== Premise ==
A young woman, Lucy, in falls from her horse while on a ride in the Virginia countryside and is rescued by her new neighbor, the foreign Count Klaus Vogul. The Count becomes obsessed by the sultry Lucy and all of her friends.
