= Arachnicide =

2014 Italian horror film featuring giant spiders

- Promotional poster
- Directed by: Paolo Bertola
- Starring: Gino Barzacchi; Gabriel Cash; Riccardo Serventi Longhi; Crisula Stafida
- Music by: Erik Ekholm
- Country of origin: Italy
- Original languages: Italian; English

Production
- Producer: Ruben Maria Soriquez
- Editor: Paolo Bertola
- Running time: 91 minutes
- Production company: See Thru Pictures
- Budget: $670,950

Original release
- Release: April 27, 2014

Arachnicide (also known as L9 Commando and Spiders) is a 2014 Italian made-for-television action horror film directed by Paolo Bertola and produced by Ruben Maria Soriquez.

== Plot ==
After years of experimenting, a researcher succeeds in creating an incubator that accelerates plant and animal growth. The technology is controlled by a powerful criminal organisation and is being used to accelerate the growth of plants needed for manufacturing of illegal drugs and narcotics. To destroy the laboratories they operate, the United Nations organises an elite team of operatives known as the L9 Commandos.

The L9 Commandos are a task force composed of six of the best soldiers from different Special Forces Units. After successfully taking down the drug operation, the L9 Commandos are called on for an important mission in Albania. There, they discover that the incubator has created a group of colossal spiders.

== Cast ==
- Gino Barzacchi as Major Murra
- Gabriel Cash as Lieutenant Kolman
- Riccardo Serventi Longhi as Colonel Monti
- Crisula Stafida as Dr. Sarti
- Andrea Graziani as Narcotrafficker

== Production ==
In 2014, Paolo Bertola served as the film's director, after having worked on another television film, Virtually Dead, which was broadcast in January of that same year. Bertola also acted as the film's editor, as well as a visual effects supervisor. The film was produced by See Thru Pictures on a budget of $670,950, under the working title of L9 Commando, and was distributed by Brain Damage Films in May 2016. On December 10, 2015, an official trailer for the film was uploaded to YouTube by Midnight Releasing.

== Release ==
The film was released on DVD by Brain Damage on May 10, 2016.

== Reception ==
Jeremy Wheeler from TV Guide awarded the film 1/4 stars, criticizing the film's acting, and poor special effects. HorrorNews.net gave the film a negative review, writing, "Horror with spiders common because one of the most well-known fears is arachnophobia. In many cases, this leads to fun movies about arachnids killing people. Arachnicide was not one of them. It felt too long, it had bad effects that weren’t even fun to look at, and it was ugly because of how certain scenes were filmed."

== See also ==
- List of natural horror films
