= Game of Seduction =

Game of Seduction Une femme fidèle
- Directed by: Roger Vadim
- Screenplay by: Roger Vadim; Daniel Boulanger
- Produced by: Francis Cosne; Raymond Eger
- Starring: Sylvia Kristel; Nathalie Delon; Jon Finch
- Cinematography: Claude Renoir
- Edited by: Victoria Mercanton
- Music by: Pierre Porte; Mort Shuman
- Distributed by: Alpha France
- Release date: 25 August 1976
- Running time: 93 minutes
- Country: France
- Language: French
- Box office: 273,394 admissions (France)

Game of Seduction (French: Une femme fidèle) is a French drama directed by Roger Vadim. Its plot is similar to the novel Les Liaisons dangereuses (1782) by Pierre Choderlos de Laclos, but the setting is changed to the mid 19th century.

== Cast ==
- Sylvia Kristel as Mathilde Leroy
- Nathalie Delon as Flora de Saint-Gilles
- Jon Finch as Comte Charles de Lapalmmes
- Gisèle Casadesus as Marquise de Lapalmmes
- Marie Lebée as Isabelle de Volnay
- Jean Mermet as The father Anselme
- Anne-Marie Deschodt as Duchesse de Volnay
- Edouard Niermans as Carral
- Annie Braconnier as Victoire
- Katy Amaizo as Pauline
- Serge Marquand as Samson
- Jacques Berthier as Monsieur Leroy

== Accolades ==
Year	Award	Category	Recipient	Result
1977	César Award	Best Cinematography	Claude Renoir	Nominated
