= Chris Westwood (author) =

English author and journalist

- Born: Christopher Westwood; 26 November 1959 (age 66); Wakefield, Yorkshire, England, United Kingdom
- Occupations: Author, Music journalist
- Writing career
- Notable works: Calling All Monsters, Profile
- Website: www.chris-westwood.com

Christopher Westwood (born 26 November 1959 in Wakefield, Yorkshire, England) is an English author and journalist. Born as the son of a coal miner and school teacher, he is best known as the author of young adult fiction and children's books. He began his writing career as a music journalist before studying Film production & TV production at a college in Bournemouth. After graduating from college, he began a career as a novelist.

== Career ==
Westwood's first publication was in the weekly English music newspaper Record Mirror, where he worked for three years until 1981 and became the first English rock journalist to cover the work of the Irish rock band U2.

His first novel A Light In The Black, was published in 1989 by Penguin Books and became a runner-up for The Guardian Children's Fiction Prize. His second young adult novel Calling All Monsters (1990), had film potential and was considered for adaptation by Steven Spielberg's Amblin Entertainment and later DreamWorks. Westwood's other novels include Brother of Mine (1993), a study of sibling rivalry between twins, Becoming Julia (1995), a taut thriller about a murder victim and her doppelgänger. These were followed by his cyberspace adventure Virtual World (1996), which was set in a world of interactive computer games. This book was in included in the contenders list for the Carnegie Medal.

His Internet stalker psychological thriller, Profile, was published in 2009. The main influence for this novel was the Alfred Hitchcock film Shadow Of A Doubt, one of several Hitchcock films referred to in the novel.

== Bibliography ==
=== Children's books ===
- A Light In The Black. HarperCollins (1991). ISBN 978-0-397-32487-3 - A stranger, Mr Stands, comes to town and with him threats to a teenager called Jules and other town inhabitants.
- Calling All Monsters. Viking (1990). ISBN 978-0-670-83293-4 - Joanne finds that the horror creations of her favourite writer are appearing in real life.
- Personal Effects. Viking (1991). ISBN 978-0-670-83879-0
- Brother Of Mine. Clarion Books (1994). ISBN 978-0-395-66137-6 - about identical twins, Nick and Tony, who antagonise each other but also occasionally pretend to be the other.
- Becoming Julia. Puffin (1996). ISBN 978-0-14-037031-7 - a girl called Maggie resembles Julia, a girl who has disappeared, so the police ask Maggie to play Julia in a television reconstruction of the day she went missing.
- Virtual World. Viking (1997). ISBN 978-0-670-87546-7 - about a boy called Jack North who becomes obsessed with a game called Silicon Sphere that somehow causes elements of itself to appear in the real world and other players to disappear.
- Profile. Lulu.com (2009). ISBN 978-1-4092-8848-0 - a thriller about an internet stalker.

=== Adult fiction ===
- Dark Brigade. Headline (1991). ISBN 978-0-7472-3479-1
- The Silence. Piatkus (1993). ISBN 978-0-7499-0195-0
- Sight Unseen. Piatkus (1994). ISBN 978-0-7499-0235-3

=== Short stories ===
- Closeness, anthology: Thirteen More Tales Of Terror
