= Schizophreniac: The Whore Mangler =

1997 film

- DVD released by Cut Throat Video
- Directed by: Ron Atkins
- Screenplay by: Ron Atkins
- Story by: Ron Atkins; John Giancaspro; Gary Lee Bauman
- Produced by: Ron Atkins
- Starring: Garvin Lee; Pete Coleman; Jennifer Atkins; Kevin O'Malley; J. Breck Brown; Jasmin Putnam; John Giancaspro
- Cinematography: Ron Atkins
- Edited by: Ron Atkins; Gary Lee Bauman
- Music by: Ron Atkins
- Production company: BNP Productions
- Distributed by: Cut Throat Video
- Release date: 1997 (United States)
- Running time: 84 minutes
- Country: United States
- Language: English

Schizophreniac: The Whore Mangler is a 1997 exploitation film written, directed, and produced by Ron Atkins. It was followed by two sequels; Necromaniac: Schizophreniac 2 in 2003, and The Cuckoo Clocks of Hell in 2011, the latter being a crossover with Last House on Dead End Street.

== Plot ==
The film follows Harry Russo, a psychotic, drug-addicted crossdresser and screenwriter who is obsessed with a puppet named Rubberneck, a gift from his girlfriend Drew, which is also the mascot of his favorite film. Harry believes Rubberneck speaks to him and has instructed him to commit acts of violence, such as killing "whores" (or "who-ers" as Harry pronounces it). Egged on by Rubberneck, Harry fatally chokes two prostitutes (mutilating and having anal sex with their bodies afterward), and stabs his psychiatrist to death.

As his mind deteriorates, Harry confesses to Rubberneck that his parents neglected, beat, humiliated, and raped him throughout his childhood and that he murdered his father when he tried to abandon him and his mother. Harry kills Drew during an argument about his impotence, rapes her dead body, and eats one of her breasts. While experiencing another psychotic episode, Harry assaults a fence, and castrates and shoots his partner-in-crime. By this point, the authorities realize a serial killer is running amok.

At a pornographic theatre, Harry's obnoxious behavior annoys the other patrons, who he then butchers via bludgeoning, slashing, and shooting. Seeing a newscast identifying him as the serial killer, Harry unsuccessfully tries to dispose of Rubberneck and has a complete mental breakdown. After suffering a series of nightmares and hallucinations, Harry strangles a neighboring little girl, changes his appearance, and goes on the run with Rubberneck.

== Cast ==
- John Giancaspro as Harry Russo
- Jasmin Putnam as Drew/The Prostitute
- J. Breck Brown as Doctor Brown
- Pete Coleman as Otis
- Garvin Lee as Jack
- Mary Francis as Woman with Baby
- Kevin O'Malley as Jim Rhoades
- Jennifer Atkins as Kim Jenkel
- Bobby Jo Rabishaw as Ms. Parker
- Sandy Shoning as Theater Victim
- Kimberly Lynn Lillard as Child
- Robert Williams as Frank Burget
- Laurie Farwell as Shower Victim
- Michael Anthony Caschetta as Theater Victim 2
- Alexis Giancaspro as Baby in Bathroom
- Gary Lee Bauman as Theater Victim 3
- Ron Atkins as The Radio Man/Rubberneck's Voice

== Reception ==
Critical Condition's review of Schizophreniac and its first sequel described both films as "the definition of sick" and "a love it or hate it affair". A score of three and a half was given by Crypt of the Dead, which wrote that the film is "sick and twisted" and "was a weird and very interesting ride" that despite the bad acting and poor special effects "[has] got some real shock value and it's also quite funny at times".

Horror News.net described it as "not so bad" and "entertaining on several levels", while Film Threat awarded five stars and summed Schizophreniac up with "There's a sense of danger here and it's bound to leave one's mouth agape despite the shortcomings of an underground film such as poor production value and acting. You don't think to poke fun at bad special effects, sets, or performances. You're just waiting to see what the hell will happen next."

Rogue Cinema praised John Giancaspro's erratic performance and said Schizophreniac may be the most disturbing film they have ever seen. Giancaspro's performance was also commended by Soiled Sinema, whose review gave the closing statement, "As can be expected, most low budget films are complete shit. Ron Atkin's Schizophreniac is an exception to the afflicted world of extremely low budget filmmaking. When you have a star like John Ginacaspro and a director with an eye for entertainment like Ron Atkins, it is hard to go wrong."

On its page detailing the works of Ron Atkins, the Worldwide Celluloid Massacre categorized the film as worthless and described Giancaspro as "an energetic but bad actor". Unrated Magazine said that while the gore was disappointing and the camera effects could get annoying, the film succeeds at shocking, Giancaspro was great, and that all in all it is "guaranteed a few laughs".
