= Calling All Monsters =

1990 novel by Chris Westwood

First edition

Calling All Monsters is the second novel by Chris Westwood, a British author of children's and young adult fiction. It was first published in the UK in 1990 by Viking Kestrel (part of the Penguin Group) and in the US in 1993 by HarperCollins Children's Books. Optioned for film three times by Steven Spielberg and later DreamWorks, the film version of the book remains unproduced.

== Reviews ==
Douglas Hill, The Guardian: Chris Westwood writes a scary book about scary books in Calling All Monsters. Young Joanne finds that the horror creations of her favourite writer are crashing terrifyingly into her real life. And when she and the writer join forces to oppose them, she learns, like Dr Frankenstein, that it is deadly difficult to unmake your own monsters. You will never read another horror story again.
