= Hazlitt Theatre =

Municipal building in Maidstone, England

Hazlitt Theatre and Exchange Studio
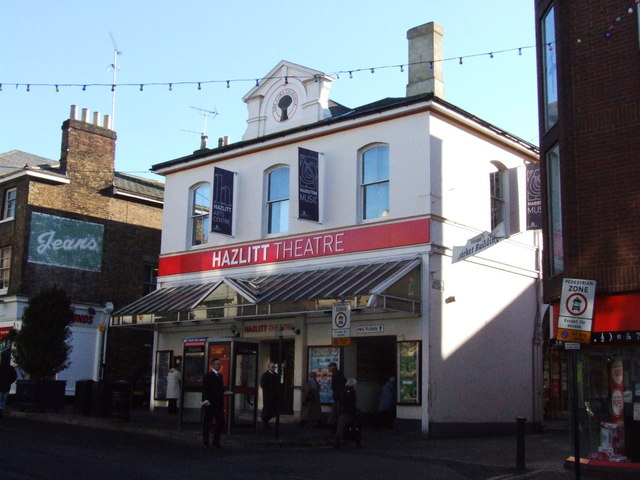
- Hazlitt Theatre and Exchange Studio

- Shown in Kent
- 51.2745°N 0.5216°E
- Location: Earl Street, Maidstone

History
- Built: 1835

Site notes
- Architectural style: Neoclassical style
- Website: www.parkwoodtheatres.co.uk/hazlitt-theatre

Listed Building – Grade II
- Official name: Market Buildings
- Designated: 2 August 1974
- Reference no.: 1086298

The Hazlitt Theatre and Exchange Studio, also known as the Hazlitt Arts Centre, is a theatre complex in Earl Street in Maidstone, Kent, England. The oldest part of the complex, which is now used as a shopping complex on the ground floor, and as a theatre venue known as the "Exchange Studio" on the first floor, is a Grade II listed building.

== History ==
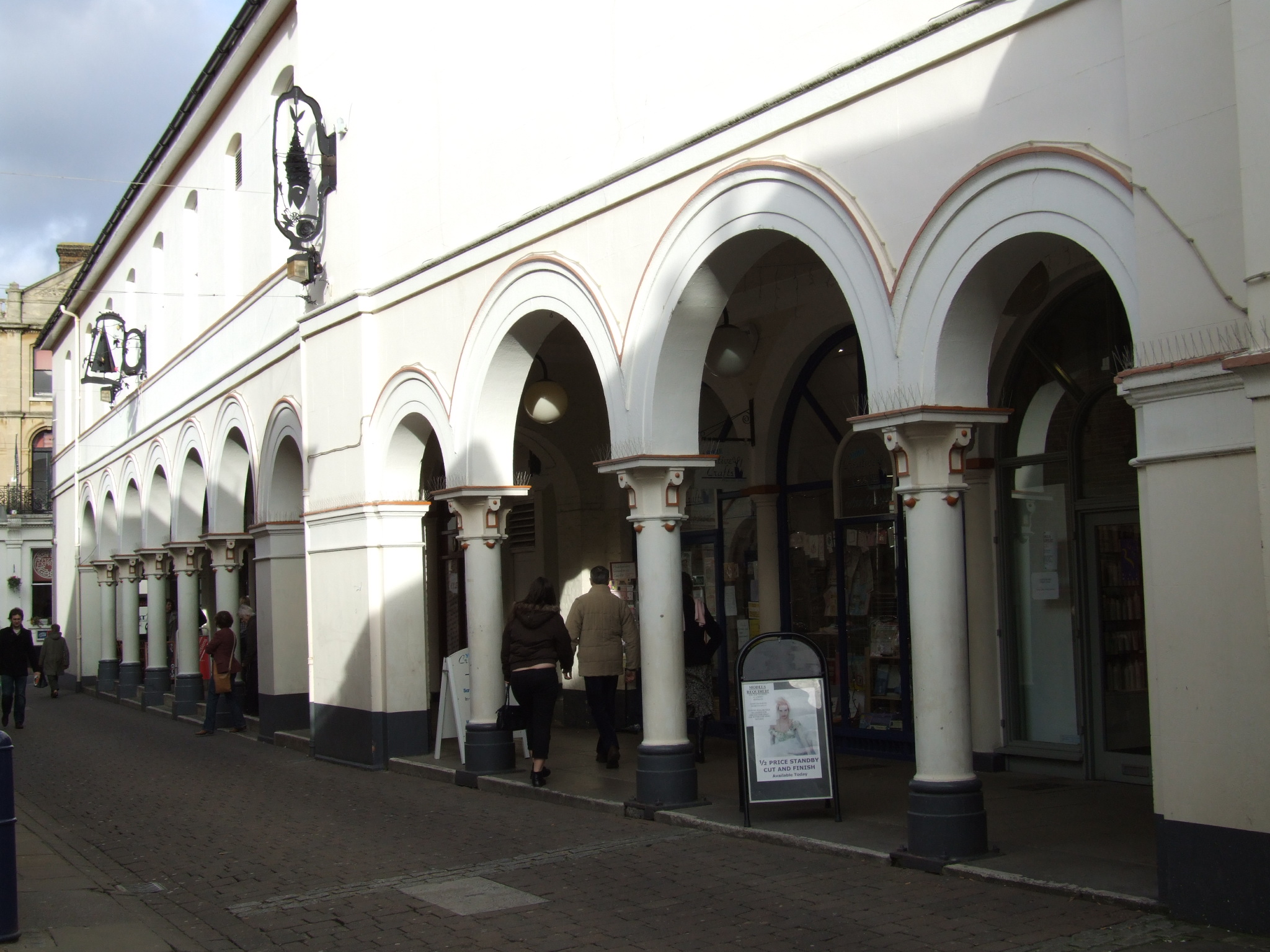
The old corn exchange, also known as the "Market Buildings", which forms the rear part of the complex

The complex was built in two parts. The older part, at the rear of the complex, was commissioned as a corn exchange, sometimes referred to as the "Market Buildings": it was designed by the Kent County Surveyor, John Whichcord Sr., in the neoclassical style, built with a stucco finish and was completed in 1835. The design involved a long frontage of 18 bays running down the right hand side of the complex. It featured a colonnade in three sections: seven bays in the north section, four bays in the central section and seven bays in the south section. On the ground floor, the bays were separated by Tuscan order columns supporting arches, while, on the first floor, the left hand section was fenestrated by sash windows (two of which were blind), the central section was completely blind, and the right hand section was fenestrated by sash windows (none of which were blind). The architectural historian, Nikolaus Pevsner, was unimpressed with the design and referred to the "ugly mid-19th century arcading".

The newer part, at the front of the complex, was commissioned as a concert hall: it was designed in the neoclassical style, built with a stucco finish, and was completed in 1869. The design involved a main frontage of three bays facing onto Earl Street. On the ground floor, the central bay contained a doorway while, in the right hand bay, there was an opening providing access to the colonnade. On the first floor, there were three segmental headed windows, and at roof level, there was a cornice and a moulded pediment. The pediment contained a circular panel with a carving of a sheaf of corn and the words "The Corn Exchange" around it.

The use of the rear part of the complex as a corn exchange declined significantly in the wake of the Great Depression of British Agriculture in the late 19th century. The ground floor was re-purposed as a series of boutique shops, while the assembly room on the first floor became the "Exchange Studio".

In the context of changing consumer tastes, the concert hall, at the front of the complex, was re-purposed as a theatre in 1955. It was initially known as the "Maidstone Municipal Theatre" and a local theatre group known as the "County Towners Variety Club" performed two variety shows a year. By the mid-1960s it had been re-named after the essayist, William Hazlitt, who had been born in Maidstone in 1778. In 1991, Maidstone Borough Council, which holds the freehold on the complex, sold a 125 lease to a property company. It then rented the complex back on a short-term sublease. In 2009, Carolyn Williams unveiled a plaque at the theatre to commemorate the life of her father, the children's television presenter, Tony Hart, who was born in the town.

The theatre itself has been a prolific centre for youth arts, following the founding of the Hazlitt Youth Theatre in 1996. The youth theatre saw its future threatened in 2020 by Maidstone Borough Council when the council threatened to cut the theatre's contract with the theatre's parent company Parkwood Theatres 8 years early, planning to return the Hazlitt to the Maidstone Borough Council, who were still the owners of the building. The council had claimed that the Theatre as a whole was no longer "good value for money". However, the council reversed its decision after extensive campaigning by Oliver Award winning composer Darren Clark and youth theatre members Devon Cable and Lee Bradley, who produced the protest song "All The Little Things" in November 2020. This was supported by a 6,000 signature petition, which made it clear to Maidstone Borough Council that the Hazlitt was worth the extra cost. The council reversed its decision in January 2021.

== Facilities ==
The Hazlitt Theatre offers seating for 382 people while the Exchange Studio offers seating for 200 people. The two venues taken together are known as the "Hazlitt Arts Centre". The venue continues to put on pantomime and other theatrical performances each year, such as locally acclaimed Hazlitt Institute productions. Most recent productions by the Hazlitt Institute (in house Youth Programme) including full length productions of Shrek the Musical and The Sound Of Music.

== See also ==
- Corn exchanges in England
