= Jon Finch =

English actor (1942–2012)

- Finch in Lady Caroline Lamb (1972)
- Born: John Nicholas Finch; 2 March 1942; Caterham, Surrey, England
- Died: 28 December 2012 (aged 70); Hastings, East Sussex, England
- Resting place: All Saints Churchyard, Hastings, East Sussex, England
- Education: Caterham School
- Occupation: Actor
- Years active: 1970–2005
- Spouse: Catriona MacColl (m. 1982–1987)
- Children: 1

John Nicholas Finch (2 March 1942 – c. 28 December 2012) was an English stage and film actor who became well known for his Shakespearean roles. Most notably, he starred in films for directors Roman Polanski (Macbeth, 1971) and Alfred Hitchcock (Frenzy, 1972).

== Early life ==
Finch was born on 2 March 1942, in Caterham in Surrey, the son of a merchant banker.

=== Education ===
Between 1950 and 1960, Finch was educated at Caterham School. Upon leaving school he refused the offer of a place at the London School of Economics.

=== Early acting and SAS ===
After performing in amateur theatre companies and singing in a folk ensemble, Finch performed his National Service in the Parachute Regiment and remained as a member of the SAS Reserve Regiment, training at weekends and several nights a week. He resigned from the Army as his acting commitments became more demanding, and said he was relieved to not have to serve in Borneo during the Indonesian Confrontation (1963–66).

He appeared on stage in From the Hill in 1963. He got a job as assistant stage manager in Pembroke Theatre in the Round.

== Career ==
=== Early television ===
In the early phase of his career, Finch appeared in episodes of Crossroads, The Fellows, ITV Playhouse, City '68, Tom Grattan's War, ITV Sunday Night Theatre and Thirty-Minute Theatre. He was in a number of episodes of Z-Cars and played Sir John Mortimer in a BBC play about Mary, Queen of Scots in 1969.

Finch played the lead character, Simon King, in the BBC science fiction series Counterstrike (1969), one of the last BBC drama series made in black and white. One of the ten episodes made was never screened, owing to the broadcast in its place of a documentary about the Kray Twins when they were jailed.

He also appeared in two Hammer Films productions, The Vampire Lovers (1970) and The Horror of Frankenstein (1970). He had a small role in the ground-breaking 1971 drama Sunday Bloody Sunday, which starred the unrelated Peter Finch. He said his career at this stage "wasn't spectacular but it was interesting."

=== Stardom ===
Finch met Roman Polanski on a plane flight. That led to the actor being cast in the lead in Polanski's 1971 version of William Shakespeare's Macbeth. His casting was announced in October 1970, and was controversial, because Finch was so young and had not performed any Shakespeare previously.

Alfred Hitchcock was looking for a lesser-known leading man for Frenzy (1972). He was impressed with the rushes for Macbeth and cast Finch. That in turn led to him being cast in Lady Caroline Lamb (1972), as William Lamb. Finch said at that stage of his career he wanted to make "one good film" a year and do theatre. He had two more films to do for Caliban, the company which made Macbeth, and was going to write screenplays. Projects announced for him included an adaptation of Dostoevsky's The Possessed and a thriller The Reporter.

In The Final Programme (1973) he played Michael Moorcock's secret agent Jerry Cornelius. In April 1973, he was called "Europe's hottest young property of the moment", announced for Gargantua from Ken Russell and Pantagruei in Italy.

However, while Frenzy was a hit, Macbeth, Lady Caroline Lamb and Final Programme were commercial disappointments. Finch starred in Diagnosis: Murder (1974). In 1975, he played the title role in a BBC/ABC joint production series about Australia's first outlawed bushranger, Ben Hall.

Finch was offered the role of James Bond in Live and Let Die (1973), but he declined the part and it went to Roger Moore. He also declined a role in Richard Lester's The Three Musketeers (1973).

Finch went to Europe to star in Game of Seduction (1976), directed by Roger Vadim, as well as The Second Power (1976) and The Standard (1977). He was credited as guest star in The New Avengers Medium Rare (1977)

In 1977, he was the original choice for the role of Doyle, taken by Martin Shaw, in the British television series The Professionals (Shaw previously had played Banquo to Finch's Macbeth in Polanski's film). Finch withdrew at the last minute, claiming that he "couldn't possibly play a policeman".

During 1978 and 1979, Finch played the role of Henry Bolingbroke in the BBC Television Shakespeare productions of Richard II, Henry IV, Part I and Henry IV, Part II, which also featured Derek Jacobi, John Gielgud, David Gwillim and Anthony Quayle in principal roles.

At the end of the decade, Finch's roles in films included Death on the Nile (1978) and La Sabina (1979).

He was cast as Kane in Ridley Scott's Alien (1979), but had to drop out after falling ill on the first day of filming, leading to a type 1 diabetes diagnosis, and John Hurt was cast in his place.

=== 1980–2005 ===
In 1980, Finch appeared in Breaking Glass and, in 1981, he played Luke the Evangelist in the television film Peter and Paul, which featured Robert Foxworth and Anthony Hopkins in the title roles. He was in Giro City (1982) with Glenda Jackson and Power Game (1983), and played an SAS man in the TV series The Odd Job Man (1984). In 1984, he played Don Pedro in the BBC's Much Ado About Nothing.

Finch became increasingly associated with support roles like Plaza Real (1988) and Streets of Yesterday, and guest starred on TV shows. On stage he shone as a memorable Edmund in a touring production of King Lear starring Nigel Davenport in 1986. He appeared in The Play on One 'Unexplained Laughter' (1989) with Diana Rigg. He was the man inside the bandages in Ken Hill’s 1991 production of The Invisible Man at the Theatre Royal Stratford East.

Occasional film roles included an appearance in Darklands (1997) and a small role as the Catholic Patriarch of Jerusalem in the Ridley Scott film Kingdom of Heaven (2005).

== Personal life and death ==
While filming Diagnosis: Murder in 1974, Finch was more than 40 lbs underweight, passed out a couple of times on set, and was then diagnosed with diabetes after being hospitalised for two weeks. In the early 1970s, until his diagnosis, he was also a racing car driver (single-seaters), but the condition prevented him from getting a racing driver licence.

Finch was married once, to the actress Catriona MacColl. They wed in 1982 and divorced in 1987. He later had a daughter.

Finch's body was discovered in his flat in Hastings, East Sussex, on 28 December 2012, after friends and family had become concerned for his welfare. He was 70 years old.

== Filmography ==
- Counterstrike (1969, TV Series) – Simon King
- The Vampire Lovers (1970) – Carl Ebhardt
- The Horror of Frankenstein (1970) – Lt. Henry Becker
- Sunday Bloody Sunday (1971) – Scotsman
- Macbeth (1971) – Macbeth
- Frenzy (1972) – Richard Blaney
- Lady Caroline Lamb (1972) – William Lamb
- The Final Programme (1973) (U.S. title: The Last Days of Man on Earth) – Jerry Cornelius
- Ben Hall (1975, TV series) – Ben Hall
- Diagnosis: Murder (1975) – Det. Insp. Lomax
- Une femme fidèle (1976) – Comte Charles de Lapalmmes
- The Second Power (1976) – Juan de Sacramonte
- The Standard (1977) – Major Charbinsky
- Death on the Nile (1978) – Mr. Ferguson
- Richard II (1978, TV film) – Henry Bolingbroke
- La Sabina (1979) – Michael
- Henry IV, Part I (1979, TV film) – King Henry IV
- Henry IV, Part II (1979, TV film) – King Henry IV
- Breaking Glass (1980) – Woods
- Gary Cooper, que estás en los cielos (1980) – Mario Pérez
- Peter and Paul (1981, TV film) – Luke
- Doktor Faustus (1982) – Adrian Leverkühn
- Giro City (1982) – O'Mally
- Power Game (1983)
- Much Ado About Nothing (1984, TV film) – Don Pedro
- Pop Pirates (1984) – Coastguard
- The Rainbow (1988, TV miniseries) — Uncle Tom
- Plaza Real (1988) – David
- The Voice (1989) – Miller
- Streets of Yesterday (1989)
- La più bella del reame (1989) – Jeremy
- Lurking Fear (1994) – Bennett
- Darklands (1996) – David Keller
- Bloodlines: Legacy of a Lord (1998) – Derek Jarvis
- Anazapta (2002) – Sir Walter de Mellerby
- New Tricks (2003, TV series) – Roddy Wringer
- Kingdom of Heaven (2005) – Patriarch Heraclius (final film role)

== Sources ==
- Hildred, Stafford. Martin Shaw, The Biography.
- Harvey F. Chartrand. "No Frenzy For Stardom: An Interview With Jon Finch", Shock Cinema (USA), 2005, Iss. 27, pg. 8-12+46.
