= The House with 100 Eyes =

- Directed by: Jim Roof
- Written by: Jim Roof; Jay Lee
- Produced by: Brian Bellinkoff; Sharon Malone
- Starring: Jim Roof; Shannon Malone
- Music by: David Bowick
- Production companies: Tapir Co; Scream HQ
- Distributed by: Artsploitation Films
- Release dates: 3 October 2013 (Grimmfest); 16 June 2015 (DVD)
- Running time: 75 minutes
- Country: United States
- Language: English

The House with 100 Eyes is a 2013 American mockumentary horror comedy film directed by Jim Roof, starring Roof and Shannon Malone.

== Cast ==
- Jim Roof as Ed
- Shannon Malone as Susan
- Liz Burghdorf as Crystal
- Larissa Lynch as Jamie
- Andrew Hopper as Clutch

== Release ==
The film was released on DVD on 16 June 2015 by Atrsploitation Films.

== Reception ==
Jessy Williams of Scream rated the film 4 stars out of 4, writing, "All in all, House With 100 Eyes is 100% bloody, hilarious and shocking fun." Matt Boiselle rated the film 3.5 stars out of 5, writing, "Overall, The House With 100 Eyes will appeal to those who like their twisted indignation wrought with some finespun wittiness, and both Roof and Malone’s performances carry the film through some plodding occasions." M. L. Miller of Ain't It Cool News wrote a positive review of the film, writing that it "succeeds with two rock solid performances by its leads and a tone that will have you laughing and wincing all at once". Sean Leonard of HorrorNews.net wrote the film a positive review, writing, "Some of it is predictable, but we get some good performances, a little bit of a new twist on an old subject, and a pretty tension-filled finale that leaves us rewinding the last minute or so to try and know for sure what just happened."

Mike Wilson of Bloody Disgusting wrote a mixed review of the film, writing, "So while I give points for trying to do something different with a tired fad mixed in with another tired fad, House With 100 Eyes unfortunately treads down the same path as the other films in these genres." The film received a negative review in iHorror.
