= Framed (TV series) =

- Genre: Crime drama
- Written by: Lynda La Plante
- Directed by: Geoffrey Sax
- Starring: Timothy Dalton; Timothy West; David Morrissey; Annabelle Apsion; Penélope Cruz; Trevor Cooper; James Findleton; Barry Findleton; Rowena King; Sheila White
- Ending theme: "The Great Pretender" — The Platters
- Composer: Nick Bicât
- Country of origin: United Kingdom
- Original languages: English; Spanish
- No. of series: 1
- No. of episodes: 4

Production
- Executive producers: Brenda Reid; Delia Fine
- Producer: Guy Slater
- Cinematography: Barry McCann
- Editors: Jim Howe; Graham Walker
- Running time: 60 minutes
- Production companies: Anglia Television; A&E Network Television; Tesauro Productions

Original release
- Network: ITV
- Release: 27 November – 18 December 1992

Framed is a British television crime drama series, created and written by acclaimed author Lynda La Plante, adapted from her novel of the same name. The four-part series, broadcast on ITV, ran from 27 November to 18 December 1992 and followed police officer Lawrence Jackson (David Morrissey), who whilst on holiday in Spain, bumps into career criminal Eddie Myers (Timothy Dalton), who was known to have been involved a bank robbery committed several years ago, but was never caught. The officer who investigated the original case, Jimmy McKinnes (Timothy West) assigns Jackson to go undercover and live with Myers in an attempt to finally bring him to justice.

Annabelle Apsion co-stars as Susan Jackson, Larry's long-suffering wife who has an affair whilst Larry is working on the case, and Penélope Cruz stars as Lola Del Moreno, one of Myers' girls who has been protecting him during his time living in Spain. For its broadcast in the United States, the series was edited down into one, feature-length special, of just 120 minutes long. It removed most of the first episode, which was filmed in Spain, and various scenes of Morrissey and Apsion from the other episodes. The series was remade in the United States in 2002, starring Rob Lowe and Sam Neill in the title roles.

The series was produced by Anglia Television, in association with A&E Network Television and Tesauro Productions. The complete series was released on DVD on 16 January 2006.

== Characters ==
- Timothy Dalton as Eddie Myers
- Timothy West as D.C.I. Jimmy McKinnes
- David Morrissey as D.C. Lawrence 'Larry' Jackson
- Annabelle Apsion as Susan Jackson
- Penélope Cruz as Lola Del Moreno
- Trevor Cooper as D.I. Frank Shrapnel
- James Findleton as Tony Jackson
- Barry Findleton as John Jackson
- Rowena King as Charlotte Lampton
- Sheila White as Moyra Sheffield
- Glyn Grimstead as D.I. Jimmy Falcon
- Anthony Smee as Superintendent Glycin
- Wayne Foskett as D.C. Summers
- Francis Johnson as D.C. Frisby
- Carol Holt as Nurse Jackie

== Episodes ==
No. overall	No. in series	Title	Directed by	Written by	Original release date	Viewers (millions)
1	1	"Episode 1"	Geoffrey Sax	Lynda La Plante	27 November 1992	N/A
Whilst on holiday in Spain, DC Lawrence Jackson is alarmed when he believes he has spotted none other than Eddie Myers, a figurehead turned informant who was wanted for his involvement in a bank robbery some years previously. However, Myers was believed to be long since dead after his wife identified a corpse found in Italy. Convinced that he has seen Myers, Jackson investigates, obtains Myers’ fingerprints, then calls his team back home and soon enough, they arrive on the island to find Myers living it large. Myers is arrested and deported back to England, however he refuses to talk to anyone but Jackson. Myers is kept in a confinement cell, and DCI Jimmy McKinnes assigns Jackson the task of living with Myers until he can obtain information to the whereabouts of the other suspects involved in the bank robbery.
2	2	"Episode 2"	Geoffrey Sax	Lynda La Plante	4 December 1992	N/A
Jackson, determined to get Myers to spill the beans, gets closer and closer to Myers and his charismatic personality. On a short weekend home with his family he and his wife argue repeatedly and, before long, she finds herself in the company of Jackson's colleague, DC Frisby. Meanwhile, the episode deals more and more with the development of a friendship relationship between Myers and Jackson - eating together, working out together and talking of their personal lives for hours. Myers agrees to accompany Jackson and McKinnes to the reported dumping ground of the weapon used in the original robbery, only to be ambushed by parties unknown who bear a grudge - leaving Myers at death's door and McKinnes' case in tatters.
3	3	"Episode 3"	Geoffrey Sax	Lynda La Plante	11 December 1992	N/A
Myers awakes in hospital, having survived the crash relatively unscathed. Knowing that old acquaintances have cottoned on to his plans, Myers decides that time is running out to get back what is rightfully his and shares with Jackson that an untouched £1 million from the robbery is stored away in a safety deposit box. Jackson slips away to a rendezvous with one of Myers' girls from Spain, and she accompanies him to a bank that is the alleged location of the money. While in the hospital, Myers realises that he is being kept under surveillance as well as having a live-in officer Once in a safe house he decides to cut his losses and fakes an accident resulting in him being taken to hospital by ambulance. During the ride, he asks Jackson if he wants in on the robbery, a fact which Jackson fails to communicate to McKinnes. Jackson is torn between his career which is shattering due to his close relationship with Myers and a very large sum of money - but will duty be swayed by temptation? Meanwhile, Jackson also pays an unplanned visit to Myers' wife, much to McKinnes' dismay, and DI Shrapnel makes an error which Jackson tries to cover up for him.
4	4	"Episode 4"	Geoffrey Sax	Lynda La Plante	18 December 1992	N/A
The day of the robbery arrives. Myers escapes from his captors with Jackson and steals a police car. After changing cars, he drives into the central banking district. Jackson keeps McKinnes ahead of the game and McKinnes lies in wait when Myers and Jackson arrive. However, little does Jackson know that Myers has been stringing him along and that the bank they are in fact going to raid is not the bank Jackson originally believed it was. The heist goes ahead as planned, but in an attempt to salvage the remains of the operation, Jackson becomes the getaway driver to safeguard other people on the road. Myers, holding a gun to Jackson's neck, however, has other plans and dismounts at the railway station, where he soon manages to give the police the slip. Jackson is left to face the music while Myers leaves with a large sum to parts unknown. But is it all over?
