= Royal Victoria Hall, Southborough =

Former theatre in Southborough, Kent, England

Coordinates: 51°09′23″N 0°15′37″E

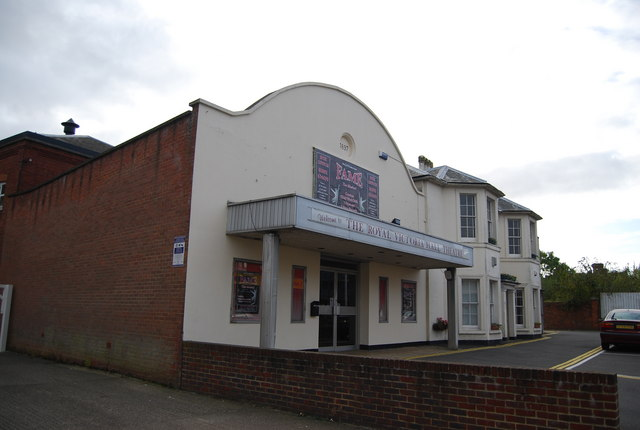
Royal Victoria Hall in 2009

Royal Victoria Hall, Kent was historically notable as the first Municipally funded theatre in England. It stood on London Road, Southborough, Kent and opened on 17 January 1900 to celebrate the Diamond Jubilee of Queen Victoria.

A significant sum for the construction costs was raised by Sir David Lionel Goldsmid-Stern-Salomons, 2nd Baronet, who resided at nearby Broomhill. Sir David is the nephew of Sir David Salomons the 1st Baronet. Such was his standing that he unusually obtained permission to use the Royal Coat of Arms for the theatre on the proscenium arch above the stage.

== Design ==
The design of Royal Victoria Hall is based on the Sir David Lionel's notable Science Theatre at Broomhill.

The Courier article 25 January 1900 cited the altruistic nature of Sir David Lionel insisting on using local labour and materials where possible, notably including bricks manufactured in nearby High Brooms

Sir David Lionel was a meticulous designer. The rake of the seating enhanced the comfort of the theatre goers. The proscenium is extremely rare nowadays. There were ladies and gentlemen's green rooms either side of the stage. The kitchen was in the basement to allow substantial catering when the theatre converted to a Hall, Indeed, many large functions were held at the Hall.

== Frontage ==
The original frontage included wrought iron canopy. There was a gated and wrought iron fence to separate the road, this was later replaced with brick wall.

In the 1970s. the frontage was substantially refurbished to allow alterations externally. The design then matched the next door, and earlier built, Council Offices.

== Commemorative plaque ==
In 1909, a commemorative plaque was unveiled by dignitaries, recognising the significant contribution of Sir David Lionel. The inscription states "This hall was erected in 1899, to commemorate the Diamond Jubilee of Queen Victoria's reign. Three-quarters of the cost was contributed by Sir David Salomons, Bart[Baronet], of Broomhill, the remainder by the [Southborough] Urban District Council upon the condition that the hall should be under the control of the Urban District Council for the benefit of the inhabitants of Southborough."

== Royal Connections ==
Such was Sir David Lionel's connections, he sought use of the prefix Royal for the Victoria Hall, despite Queen Victoria not having visited the Hall.

Her Majesty granted a licence to use the Royal Coat of Arms on September 5, 1899. The Hall was opened on Wednesday January 17, 1900, with two patriotic concerts in aid of the Transvaal War Fund.

== Events, concerts, radio shows, and pantomimes ==
The Royal Victoria Hall was meticulously designed to hold a variety of functions to maximise usability. Whilst the latter years became synonymous with pantomimes, Royal Victoria Hall has hosted a wide variety of events including a Fleetwood Mac concert in 1971, various live Radio 2 shows with Don Dubridge and Paul James, and even speeches by Enoch Powell in 1969 and 1978.

== Demolition ==
Demolition commenced in May 2017 to be replaced by a modern development of Council Offices and ancillary facilities.
