= Alice in Murderland (film) =

- Film poster
- Directed by: Dennis Devine
- Written by: Dennis Devine
- Starring: Malerie Grady
- Distributed by: Brain Damage Films
- Release date: 2010
- Running time: 86 minutes
- Country: United States
- Language: English

Alice in Murderland (also known as The Alice in Wonderland Murders) is a 2010 low-budget American horror film written and directed by Dennis Devine, based on and inspired by both Alice's Adventures in Wonderland and Alice Through the Looking-Glass, and What Alice Found There by Lewis Carroll. It stars Malerie Grady, Marlene McCohen, Kelly Kula and Christopher Senger.

The film has received negative reviews by critics and horror fans.

== Plot ==
Twenty-year-old Alice Lewis is turning 21, and is upset about it. Her sorors want to cheer her up and decide to hold a birthday party with an Alice in Wonderland theme at Charlene Glass's house. Alice knows that in the basement of that house, her mother, Ann Lewis, was brutally hacked to death by a masked killer 20 years before. The girls set a rule that no cell phones and no boys will be allowed.

Everyone comes dressed as their favorite character from the books. Someone who was not invited comes as the Jabberwocky (a fierce dragon from Alice Through the Looking-Glass) and brings mayhem to the girls' night, as he starts murdering them one by one while the party is taking place.

== Cast ==
- Malerie Grady as Alice Lewis
- Marlene Mc'Cohen as Malory White
- Kelly Kula as Kat Glass
- Christopher Senger as Rene White
- Katie Loche O'Brien as Tiffany
- Heath Butler as Donna
- Kim Argetsinger as Samantha Glass
- Gabrielle Abitol as Charlene Glass
- Elizabeth Lam Nguyen as Pima
- Jennifer Field as Dee
- Jennifer Kamstock as Aunt Lena
- Katie Hotchkiss as Ann Lewis
- Montre Bible as Andrew
- John Buco II as Matt

== Release ==
Alice in Murderland was produced in 2010 by Tom Cat Films and was released on February 8, 2011, by Brain Damage Films.

== Reception ==
HorrorNews said, "In spite of whatever criticisms I can make, I have to admit I kinda liked it. It’s a low budget, indie horror film that both suffers and benefits from everything that entails. I’m not going to tell you this film is great, but there are moments of greatness peppered throughout the film. The concept itself makes the film worth watching."
