= The Last Horror Movie =

2003 British found footage horror film by Julian Richards

- Directed by: Julian Richards
- Written by: James Handel; Julian Richards
- Story by: Julian Richards
- Produced by: Zorana Piggott, Julian Richards
- Starring: Kevin Howarth; Mark Stevenson
- Cinematography: Chris St. John-Smith
- Edited by: Claus Wehlisch
- Music by: Simon Lambros
- Release date: 24 August 2003 (London FrightFest Film Festival)
- Running time: 80 minutes
- Country: United Kingdom
- Language: English

The Last Horror Movie is a 2003 British found footage horror film directed by Julian Richards. On 24 August 2003, it premiered at the London FrightFest Film Festival and stars Kevin Howarth and Mark Stevenson. The Last Horror Movie was released onto DVD through Fangoria's Gore Zone label on 7 December 2004.

== Plot ==
The Last Horror Movie follows Max Parry (Kevin Howarth), a wedding videographer who records his activities as a serial killer. The film begins with a typical slasher sequence that is interrupted when Max appears on screen, explaining that he has taped over the original rental movie. He introduces his unnamed assistant (Mark Stevenson), who films much of what follows.

Max describes his intention to create a realistic film about murder. The pair travel around England, abducting and killing various victims while discussing the nature of violence and the audience’s attraction to it. Max frequently addresses the viewer directly, treating the recording as both confession and commentary.

In one scene, the murders of two victims occur off-screen, after which Max asks the viewer, “I bet you wanted to see that, and if you didn’t, why are you still watching?” The sequence emphasizes his awareness of being watched and his attempt to engage the audience in his actions.

The film concludes with Max suggesting that the copy being viewed may be the only version of the tape in existence, implying that whoever watches it may become one of his next victims.

== Cast ==
- Kevin Howarth as Max
- Mark Stevenson as The Assistant
- Antonia Beamish as Petra
- Christabel Muir as Sam
- Jonathan Coote as John
- Rita Davies as Grandma
- Joe Hurley as Ben (as Joe Morley)
- Jamie Langthorne as Nico
- John Berlyne as Phil
- Linda Regan as Terri
- Mandy Gordon as Sarah
- Jim Bywater as Bill
- Lisa Renée as Waitress
- Christopher Adamson as Killer (as Chris Adamson)
- Adrian Johnson as Kelly
- John MacCrossan as Groom

== Development ==
Richards stated that he was inspired to create The Last Horror Movie after reading Stephen King's Danse Macabre. Richards was also inspired by "the idea of using horror fiction to help people explore their anxieties about difficult issues", as he has the main character of Max Parry using it as a way to "justify his crimes to the world". The movie was filmed with a small crew on a limited budget, with most of the film's issues stemming from the prosthetic make-up effects, as they "had to work real time whilst remaining hidden from the camera".

== Release ==
Hart Sharp Video released the DVD Director's Cut and normal cut versions of the film on 7 December 2004. Arts Alliance America also released the film on DVD that same day. Hart Sharp Video has re-released the film several times since their original releases of the film as a part of several multi-disk sets on 4 October 2005 and 2 October 2007. The film was last released on DVD by Jinga Films on 26 August 2014.

== Reception ==
On Rotten Tomatoes, the film holds an approval rating of 50% based on 8 reviews, with a weighted average rating of 5.7/10. ReelFilm criticized the movie as being "repetitive" and that the film would have worked better as a short. Peter Bradshaw from The Guardian awarded the film 1/5 stars, calling it "smug and drearily nasty".

In contrast, Dread Central gave a more positive review and stated that "It's a movie that makes you think, and that's far too rare nowadays." Marc Savlov from Austin Chronicle gave the film 2.5 out of 5 stars, writing, " Despite the film’s horrific verisimilitude... and a genuinely smart screenplay by Richards and James Handel that simultaneously rubs our noses in the horror while allowing us to savor the flavor – and thereby become complicit in Max’s onscreen theatrics"

== Awards ==
- 2005 - Buenos Aires Rojo Sangre Film Festival - Best Film - Winner
- 2005 - Buenos Aires Rojo Sangre Film Festival - Best Actor (Kevin Howarth) - Winner
- 2004 - Espoo Ciné - Méliès d'Argent, Grand Prize of European Fantasy Film in Silver - Winner
- 2004 - Fantasporto - Critics' Award - Winner
- 2004 - Fantasporto - International Fantasy Film Award - Nominee only
- 2004 - New York City Horror Film Festival - Best Actor (Kevin Howarth) - Winner
- 2004 - New York City Horror Film Festival - Best Feature Film - Winner
- 2004 - Rhode Island International Horror Film Festival - Best Director (Julian Richards) - Winner
- 2003 - Festival of Fantastic Films (UK) - Best Independent Feature Award -Winner
- 2003 - Raindance Film Festival - Jury Prize for Best UK Feature - Winner
- 2003 - Festival de Cine de Sitges - Best Film - Nominee Only

== Sequel ==
Richards first expressed interest about creating a sequel in 2003, where he remarked that if it was created, the film would either remain in the found footage video diary format of its predecessor or be a "more conventional slasher movie". In 2012 Richards confirmed that he is actively developing a sequel and that it would be set several years after the events of the first film. The sequel would have Max living in Los Angeles and showing an obsession with social networking sites, which he uses to select his victims.
