= An Unquiet Grave =

2020 film directed by Terence Krey

- Promotional release poster
- Directed by: Terence Krey
- Written by: Terence Krey; Christine Nyland
- Starring: Jacob A. Ware; Christine Nyland
- Production company: Unquiet Films
- Distributed by: Shudder
- Release date: October 11, 2020
- Running time: 72 minutes
- Country: United States
- Language: English

An Unquiet Grave is a 2020 American horror drama film directed by Terence Krey. Its plot features a man, Jamie, whose wife Julia recently died. With the help of Julia's sister Ava, Jamie attempts to bring Julia back from the dead.

== Cast ==
- Jacob A. Ware as Jamie
- Christine Nyland as Ava

== Release ==
An Unquiet Grave was released in the United States at the 2020 Nightstream Film Festival. It is distributed by Shudder.

== Reception ==
On the review aggregator website Rotten Tomatoes, 70% of 27 critics' reviews are positive.

Writing for RogerEbert.com, Simon Abrams gave the film 3 stars out of 4, calling it a "spare, dread-filled mood piece" that "for the most part, [...] is as absorbing as it is focused." Lorry Kikta of Film Threat likewise gave the film a positive review, calling it "a great example of an indie horror film that makes the best of the resources available."
