= Breaking the Code =

1986 play written by Hugh Whitemore

Spanish adaptation of the play in Chile in 2005.

Breaking the Code is a 1986 British play by Hugh Whitemore about British mathematician Alan Turing, who was a key player in the breaking of the German Enigma code at Bletchley Park during World War II and a pioneer of computer science. The play thematically links Turing's cryptographic activities with his attempts to grapple with his homosexuality.

It was adapted into a 1996 television film directed by Herbert Wise, with Derek Jacobi reprising his stage role as Turing.

== Characters ==
- Alan Turing
- Mick Ross, detective
- Christopher Morcom, Turing's childhood friend (1911–1930)
- Sara Turing, Turing's mother (1881–1976)
- Ron Miller, a young man having an affair with Turing (based on Arnold Murray)
- Dillwyn Knox, manager at Bletchley Park recruiting Turing for government service
- Patricia "Pat" Green, a co-worker of Turing's at Bletchley (based on Joan Clarke; 1917–1996)

== Performance history ==
Following an eight-month run at the Theatre Royal, Haymarket in London's West End beginning on 21 October 1986, the play ran on Broadway in New York City from 15 November 1987, to 10 April 1988, in both cases starring Derek Jacobi. The Broadway production also featured Jenny Agutter in the role of Pat Green. William A. Henry III, writing in Time magazine, described the play as "elegant and poignant". The Broadway production was nominated for three Tony Awards including Best Actor in a Play, Best Featured Actor in a Play, and Best Direction of a Play, and for two Drama Desk awards, for Best Actor and Best Featured Actor. Following Jacobi's departure, the London production transferred to the Comedy Theatre with John Castle as Turing.

The national première for Italy of the play was translated and directed by Luca Giberti at the Teatro Stabile in Genoa, featuring Jurij Ferrini.

During the Turing Centenary 2012, there were two productions of the play in Germany, at the English Theatre Frankfurt and an amateur tour through Germany and the Netherlands by the University Players Hamburg.

The play was also staged just before the start of the Alan Turing Year celebrations, in December 2011, at the Old Fire Station Theatre in Oxford, by Oxford Theatre Guild.

The play was produced at The Royal Exchange Theatre in 2016, the first major revival of the play in thirty years, with Daniel Rigby in the role of Alan Turing.

On 5 October 2019 a new production of the play began at Salisbury Playhouse in the UK. Directed by Christian Durham the performance is given in the round. To achieve this the usual seating configuration of the Playhouse was changed and seats placed on the stage. The part of Alan Turing was played by Edward Bennett.

The play ran at the Central Square Theater in Cambridge, Massachusetts, USA beginning on April 2, 2026. Eddie Shields played Turing in a new production directed by Scott Edmiston.

The play is set to be performed again in 2026 by the Norwich Player's Theatre Company at The Maddermarket Theatre in Norwich, Norfolk, UK with a performance coinciding with their annual Norwich Pride celebrations.

== In other media ==
=== Television ===
The play was adapted for television in a 1996 BBC filmed production, directed by Herbert Wise, and also starring Jacobi, which won a Broadcasting Press Guild Award and was nominated for two BAFTA TV awards, for best single drama and best actor, and for a GLAAD Media Award. It was broadcast in the United States by PBS on Masterpiece Theatre. A producer's cut was released on DVD in 2012.
