= Christopher Morcom Prize for Science =

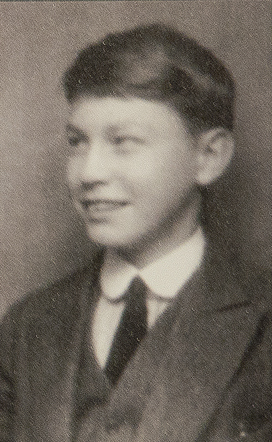
- Sherborne student, astronomer, and prankster Christopher Morcom, for whom the award is named.
- Awarded for: Excellence in science
- Venue: Sherborne School, Dorset, England
- Established: 1930

The Christopher Morcom Prize for Science, established in 1930, is a science prize at Sherborne School to "encourage the true pursuit of Science among Shirburnians".

It was named in memory of Sherborne student athlete, astronomer, and prankster Christopher Morcom.

It was established in 1930 by his parents, the Colonel R.K. Morcom, and sculptor and artist Frances Isobel Swan.

Morcom was a close childhood friend of computer scientist Alan Turing, who received the award twice.

== Background ==
Morcom himself was a science award winner, and considered one of Sherborne's most promising students. In 1929, he won the Digby Prize for Mathematics and Science. He won a scholarship to Trinity College, Cambridge at the age of 18. However, in 1930, Morcom died of tuberculosis. The prize was established on the year he was meant to graduate.

== Design ==
The interior text was illustrated by Madeline Walker in the style of illuminated manuscripts. It also contained an idealized portrait of a young Morcom by Norman Hirst.

The prize and its contents is described in the 1933 Shirburnian as follows:

The Christopher Morcom Prize for Science, in memory of the boy of that name, is provided each year from a Trust Fund. In addition to the sum awarded for books the winner is also presented with a facsimile of the illuminated" Christopher Morcom Prize" book. This states the object of the Prize and contains the names of the winners from year to year. A beautiful case of teak, in itself a fine example of devoted workmanship, made by a craftsman in the employ of the Morcom family, now stands in the Library. In a lower drawer it contains two dozen copies of the Prize Book for future winners; and on view in the glass case is another copy showing the beautiful illuminated work by Madeline Walker. A sliding panel shows on a steel plate a likeness of the boy himself, Scholar Elect of Trinity College, Cambridge, one of the most brilliant members of the School for some time past.

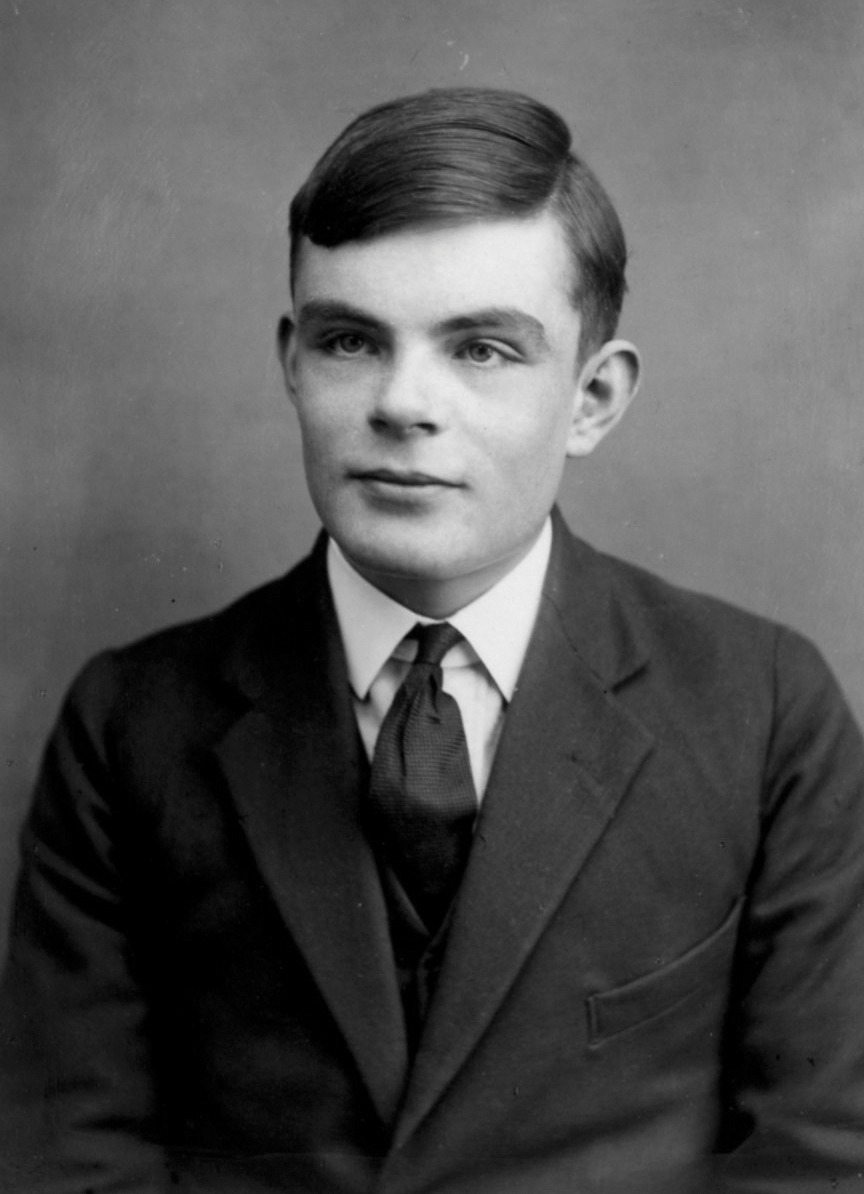
Morcom's schoolmate Alan Turing would receive the award in 1930 and 1931.

== Recipients ==
Year	Recipient	Citation	Notes
1930	Alan Mathison Turing		
1931	Alan Mathison Turing		
1934	Derman Guy Christopherson		Christopherson would go on to become a science academic.
1936	P. H. Geake		Geake was the Head of School.
1940	P. A. Turner		
1957	John Morcom		Nephew of the eponymous Christopher Morcom; twin brother of a younger Chris Morcom. Came to Sherborne in 1952. Both Morcoms also in Lyon House. Both Morcoms admitted to Trinity College, Cambridge.
Unknown year	Dermot Turing		Nephew of Alan Turing.

== See also ==
- List of science and technology awards
