= Mortimer's Law =

- Genre: Crime drama
- Written by: David Reid
- Directed by: Moira Armstrong; Peter Barber-Fleming
- Starring: Amanda Root; Nicholas McGaughey; Gwenyth Petty; Shirley King; Clive Merrison; Louise Breckon-Richards; Valentine Pelka
- Composer: Ilona Sekacz
- Country of origin: United Kingdom
- Original language: English
- No. of series: 1
- No. of episodes: 6

Production
- Executive producers: Malcolm Heyworth; Jen Samson
- Producer: Stephen Jeffery-Poulter
- Editor: Michael Parkinson
- Running time: 50 minutes
- Production company: Chatsworth Television

Original release
- Network: BBC One
- Release: 6 February – 13 March 1998

Mortimer's Law is a British television crime drama series, first broadcast on 6 February 1998, that ran for six episodes on BBC One. The series starred Amanda Root as Rachel Mortimer, a London-based barrister who finds herself relocating to rural Wales after her defence in a sexual assault case goes horrifically wrong. Taking up the post of Coroner, Mortimer finds herself investigating a series of gruesome cases alongside her loyal partner, Gwil Humpries (Nicholas McGaughey). Initially broadcast at 21:30 on Fridays, a single series was broadcast before being axed by the network. The series was a co-production between Chatsworth television and BBC Wales.

Root said of her role in the series; "When researching the role, I listened to some tapes from a Coroner's Officer where they were trying to establish if someone who had died under the wheels of a train had committed suicide. There was an interview with the train driver, who had to give all the facts about what he saw in the last moments before the train hit this man - how he had run on to the line, how he had braced himself. I will never forget those images. I also went to see a woman coroner in Southwark who was fantastic. She was very centred and self-controlled. She organised her court quite brilliantly, and she was formidable in the best sense of the word."

== Cast ==
- Amanda Root as Coroner Rachel Mortimer
- Nicholas McGaughey as DC Gwil Humphries
- Gwenyth Petty as Mrs. Morgan
- Shirley King as Sioned
- Clive Merrison as Dr. Tegwyn Berry
- Windsor Davies as Ian Pugh
- Valentine Pelka as John Keswick

== Episodes ==
No.	Title	Directed by	Written by	British air date
1	"Trial By Fire"	Moira Armstrong	David Reid	6 February 1998
‘’Extended episode’’. London-based barrister Rachel Mortimer returns home to Wales to defend Brian James Batty, a man charged with the rape of a woman in her own home. She is reunited with her mentor Pugh, the local coroner, who is dealing with the unexplained death of a man, which his wife puts down to the mental affect of a long-term overexposure to chemicals. At trial, Rachel manages to destroy the prosecution’s main witness, DC Gwil Humphries, resulting in Barry being found not guilty. Rachel briefly returns to London, but soon learns of Pugh’s death. With her legal career in tatters, Rachel decides to return to Wales permanently to take up the vacant position as coroner, unaware her new staff officer is none other than the disgraced DC Humphries.
2	"Dripping Blood"	Moira Armstrong	David Reid	13 February 1998
When a corpse is found in the freezer room of a butcher's shop, Rachel and Humphries suspect the man's death may have been more than an accident. Meanwhile, a worker at a local industrial firm is minced into tiny pieces after falling into a crusher in what is deemed a horrific accident. Rachel meets with the company CO to determine whether health and safety procedures were breached, in order to determine whether or not to launch an official inquest.
3	"Devil’s Bite"	Peter Barber-Fleming	David Reid	20 February 1998
A young boy's body is found in a ravine, hours after he disappeared whilst playing metres from his house. Rachel and Gwil look into the possibility the death is linked to a teenage girl, who was found in the same ravine some two years earlier. Meanwhile, a retired truck driver is found hanged, having taken his own life. Amongst his possessions are a number of paper clippings relating to the girl’s death, addressed to his former boss - suggesting the two cases may be linked.
4	"One Dies Every Minute"	Moira Armstrong	David Reid	27 February 1998
Bronwyn Parry, a young mother who has just given birth to her first baby, dies suddenly in the county hospital. Her bigamist husband, meanwhile, is nowhere to be found. Rachel launches an inquiry with help from a local colleague, who is himself dealing with the fallout of the death of an eccentric 83-year-old war veteran. Gwil is granted access to see his children. John arrives from London to represent the health authority at Bronwyn’s inquest, and tries to reconnect with Rachel.
5	"A Long Lost Love"	Peter Barber-Fleming	David Reid	6 March 1998
Rachel presides over the inquest into the disappearance of Wendy Frampton, who has been missing for several years. Her mother believes she has been murdered by her husband, Peter. Peter’s current fiancé, a former undercover police officer, testifies to the court that he had previously admitted to the murder, but that details of the event could not possibly be true. At the eleventh hour, Gwil finds a previously unknown witness who claims to have heard details of the killing some months previously.
6	"Sundown"	Peter Barber-Fleming	David Reid	13 March 1998
A disturbing course of events leads Rachel to believe she is being stalked, and she fears it may be the psychopathic Batty. Gwil is offered his old job back in Swansea CID, and is torn when a school trip offers up a new potential romance. In his absence, Rachel is partnered with DS Michael Luscomb, who tries to pry into her private affairs in order to work out who the stalker might be. Events take an unexpected turn for Sioned.
