= The Macedonian Campaign =

1922 history book

- Author: Luigi Villari
- Publication date: 1922

The Macedonian Campaign: A History of the Salonica Expedition is a 1922 book by Italian historian Luigi Villari. It was published in English by T. Fisher Unwin.

== History ==
The same year of its publication, it was awarded to Christopher Morcom as a prize for solving a chess puzzle in The Saturday Review.

In 2011, it was listed as a source for Alan Palmer's The Gardeners of Salonika.
