= Christ Church, Catshill =

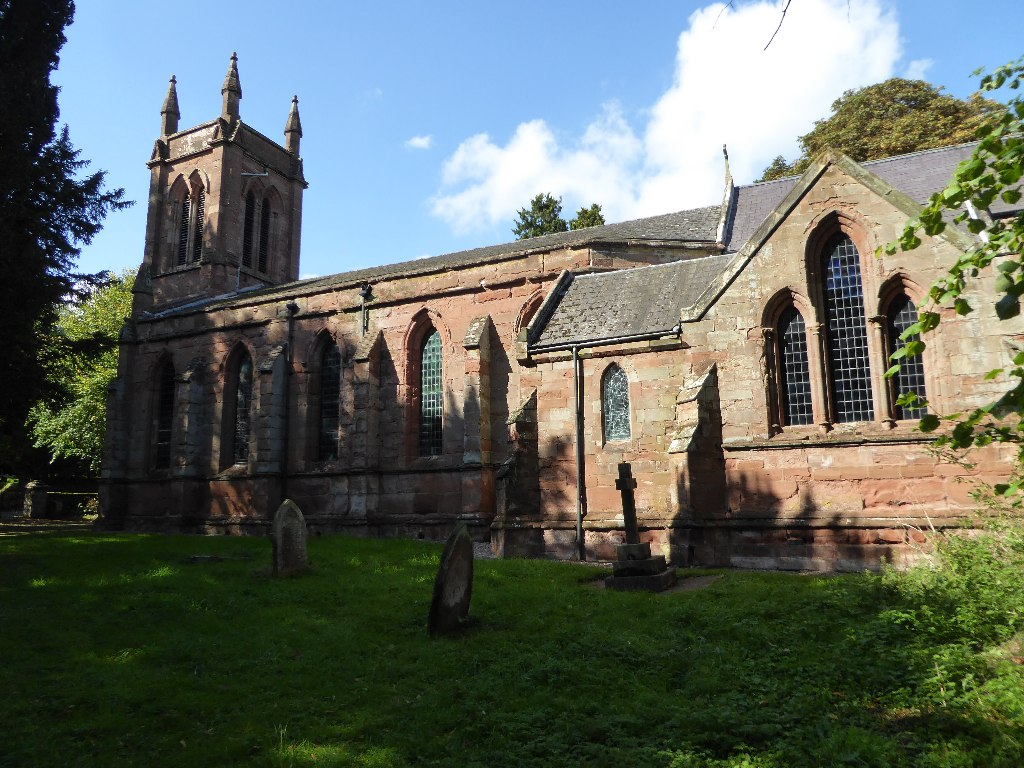
- Christ Church, Catshill
- Christ Church, Catshill
- 52°21′49.1″N 2°3′49.1″W
- Location: Catshill
- Country: England
- Denomination: Church of England

History
- Consecrated: 6 December 1838

Architecture
- Heritage designation: Grade II listed
- Designated: 1 November 1972
- Architect: Harvey Eginton
- Style: Early English Gothic
- Groundbreaking: 5 July 1837

Specifications
- Capacity: 520 persons
- Length: 50 feet (15 m)
- Width: 30 feet (9.1 m)
- Height: 40 feet (12 m)

Administration
- Diocese: Anglican Diocese of Worcester
- Archdeaconry: Dudley
- Deanery: Redditch and Bromsgrove
- Parish: Catshill

Christ Church, Catshill is a Grade II listed parish church in the Church of England in Catshill, Worcestershire.

== History ==
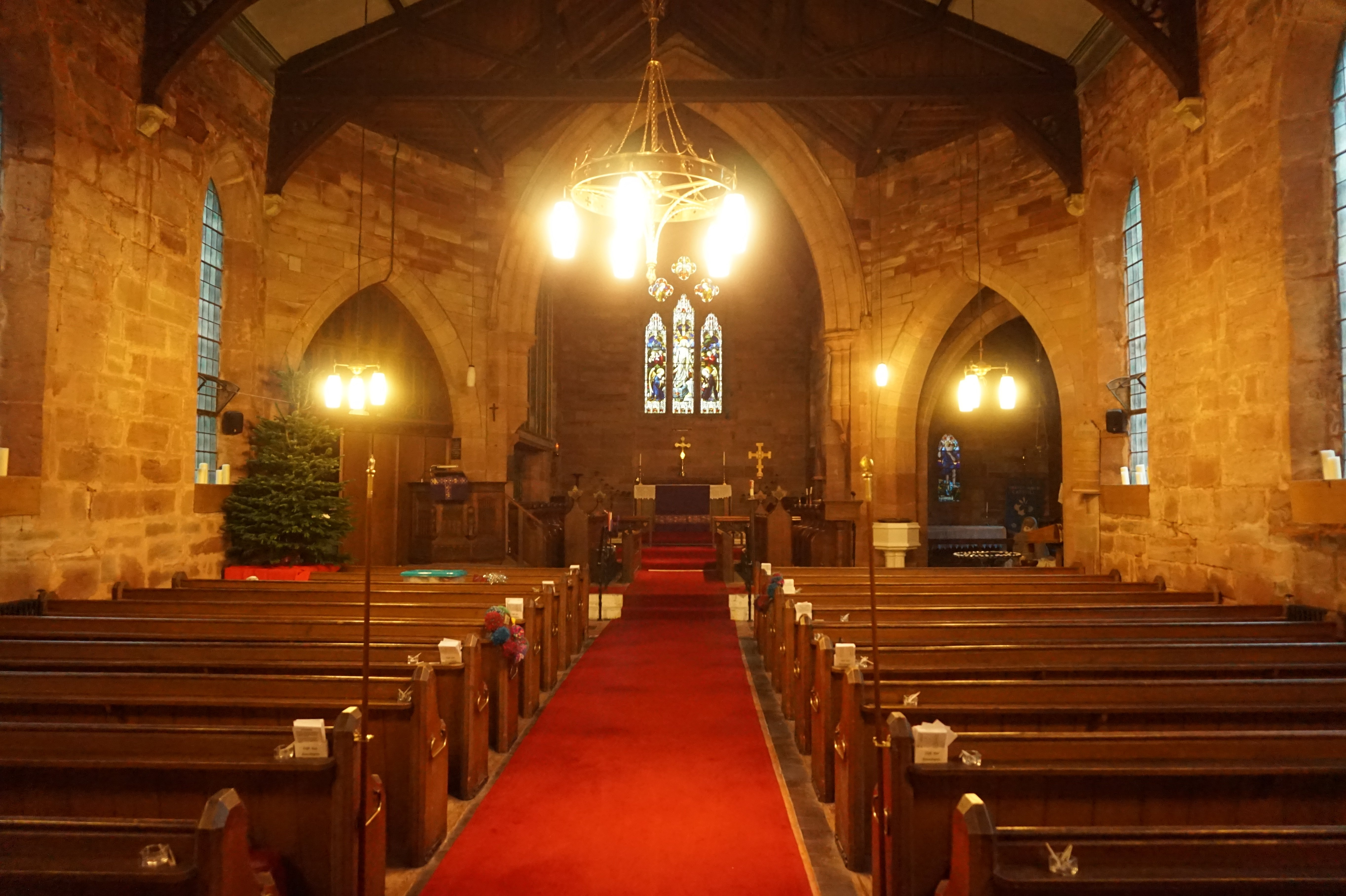
The interior

The church was built in 1838 paid for by public donations and a substantial contribution from the Worcester Diocesan Church Building Society. It was designed by Harvey Eginton, architect of Worcester, and consecrated by the Lord Bishop of Rochester, Rt. Revd. George Murray on 6 December 1838

The churchyard was consecrated in 1848.

The poet A. E. Housman was baptised in the church on 24 April 1859.

The vicarage (now 242 Stourbridge Road) was built in 1870-71. Later the vicarage moved to 240 Stourbridge Road, and that building is now known as the Old Vicarage.

In 1885 the vicar, Revd. James Kidd, launched a campaign to raise £800 for the extension of the church. The plan was to add on a chancel, and two transepts to provide accommodation for another 100 persons. This work was completed in 1887 at a cost of £1,185 (equivalent to £134,716 in 2025) by the architect J. A. Chatwin. A pulpit of Caen stone and choir stalls made of oak were presented to the church. Two stained glass commemorative windows by Burlison and Grylls were also given.

In memory of Christopher Morcom who died aged 18 on 13 February 1930, his mother commissioned a stained-glass window designed by the artist Karl Parsons. Installed in 1931 as the east window of the chapel, it depicts Saint Christopher carrying the Christ Child across a river on his shoulders; the face of the child was probably modelled after that of Morcom.

The chapel was re-ordered in 1936 by G.E.S. Streetfeild.

In 1977 Snell & Thompson screened off part of the nave under the west gallery to provide upper and lower rooms.

== Vicars ==
- Thomas Housman 1838 - 1864
- Henry John Liddon 1864 - 1868
- James Kidd 1868 - 1917
- Arthur Douglas Ager 1917 - 1919
- J. Chavasse Karn 1920 - 1925
- David T.L. Steward 1925 - 1933
- H.J.M. Hall 1933 - 1939
- Alfred Woolcock from 1939
- W. Hugh Millett
- Reginald Burley
- Philip Darby 1980 - 1988
- Richard Harding 1995 - 2002
- Amanda Arthur 2024 - current

== Status ==
The church is in a joint parish with:

- St John the Baptist Church, Bromsgrove
- St Godwald’s Church, Finstall Road, Bromsgrove
- St Andrew’s Church, Charford, Bromsgrove
- All Saints’ Church, Bromsgrove
- Holy Trinity and St Mary’s Church, Dodford
- St Luke’s Church, Marlbrook
- St Michael and All Angels’ Church, Stoke Prior
- St Mary De Wyche Church, Wychbold
- St Michael’s Church, Upton Warren

== Organ ==
The organ was built by Hewins of Stratford-upon-Avon and opened by A.J. Sainsbury on All Saints’ Day, 1884. It contains two manuals and 12 speaking stops. A specification of the organ can be found on the National Pipe Organ Register. The organ case was designed by F.C. Eden, architect of London, with hand carving, gilding, shields and scrolls, all executed by Mr. Forbes of London in 1897.

== Bells ==
The church contains a chime of four bells, three date from 1913 and the fourth from 1914, all by John Warner & Sons.

== Clock ==
The church clock bell dates from 1839 and was cast by Thomas Mears.
