= Underhill, Gateshead =

Listed building in Gateshead, England

Axwell House
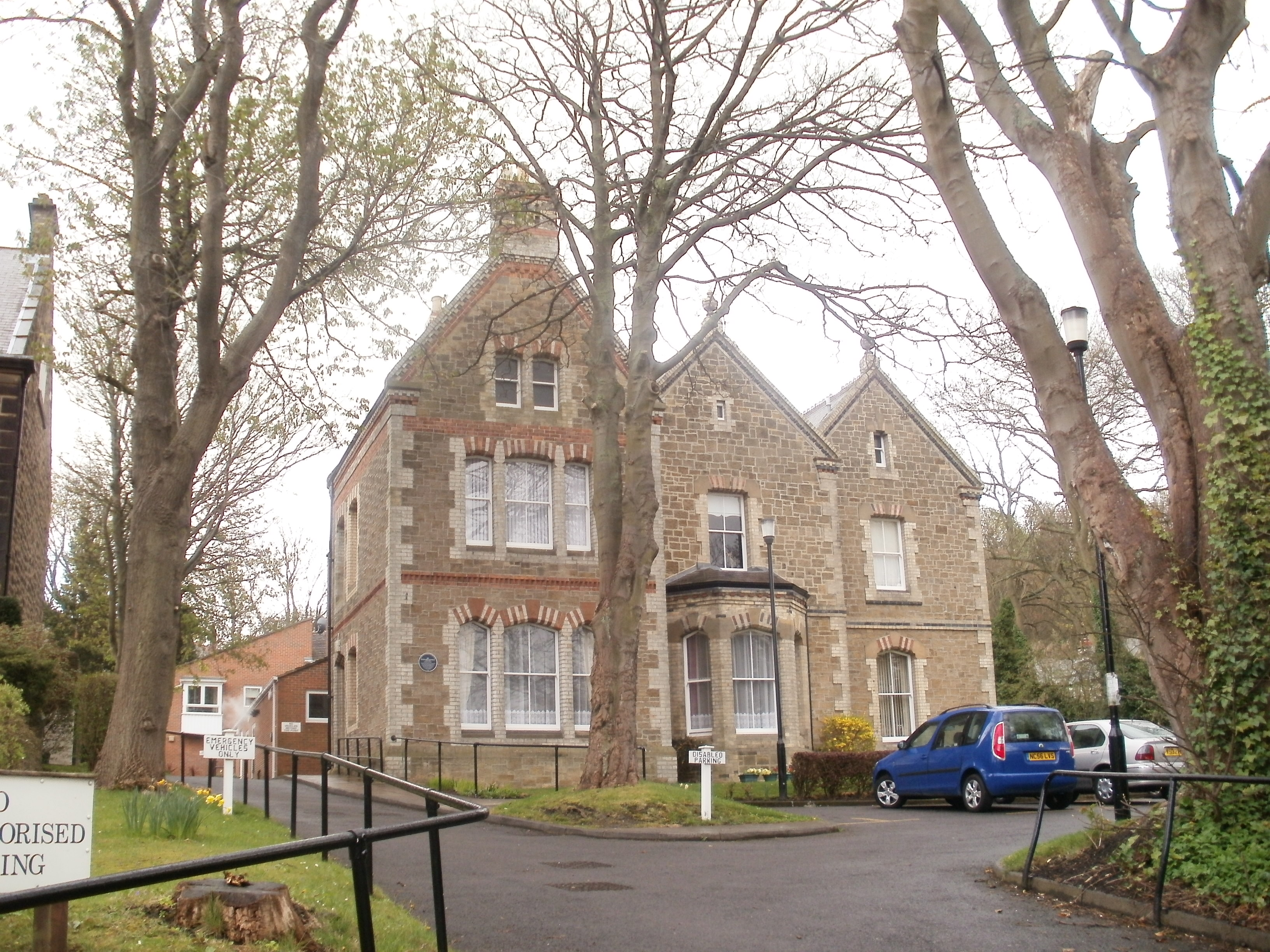
- Underhill, 99 Kells Lane, Low Fell. Home of Sir Joseph Wilson Swan from 1869–83.

- Location within Tyne and Wear

General information
- Architectural style: Victorian
- Location: Low Fell, Gateshead, England
- Coordinates: 54.9396°N 1.5923°W
- Year built: 1860s

Listed Building – Grade II*
- Official name: Underhill
- Designated: 2 June 1976
- Reference no.: 1248562

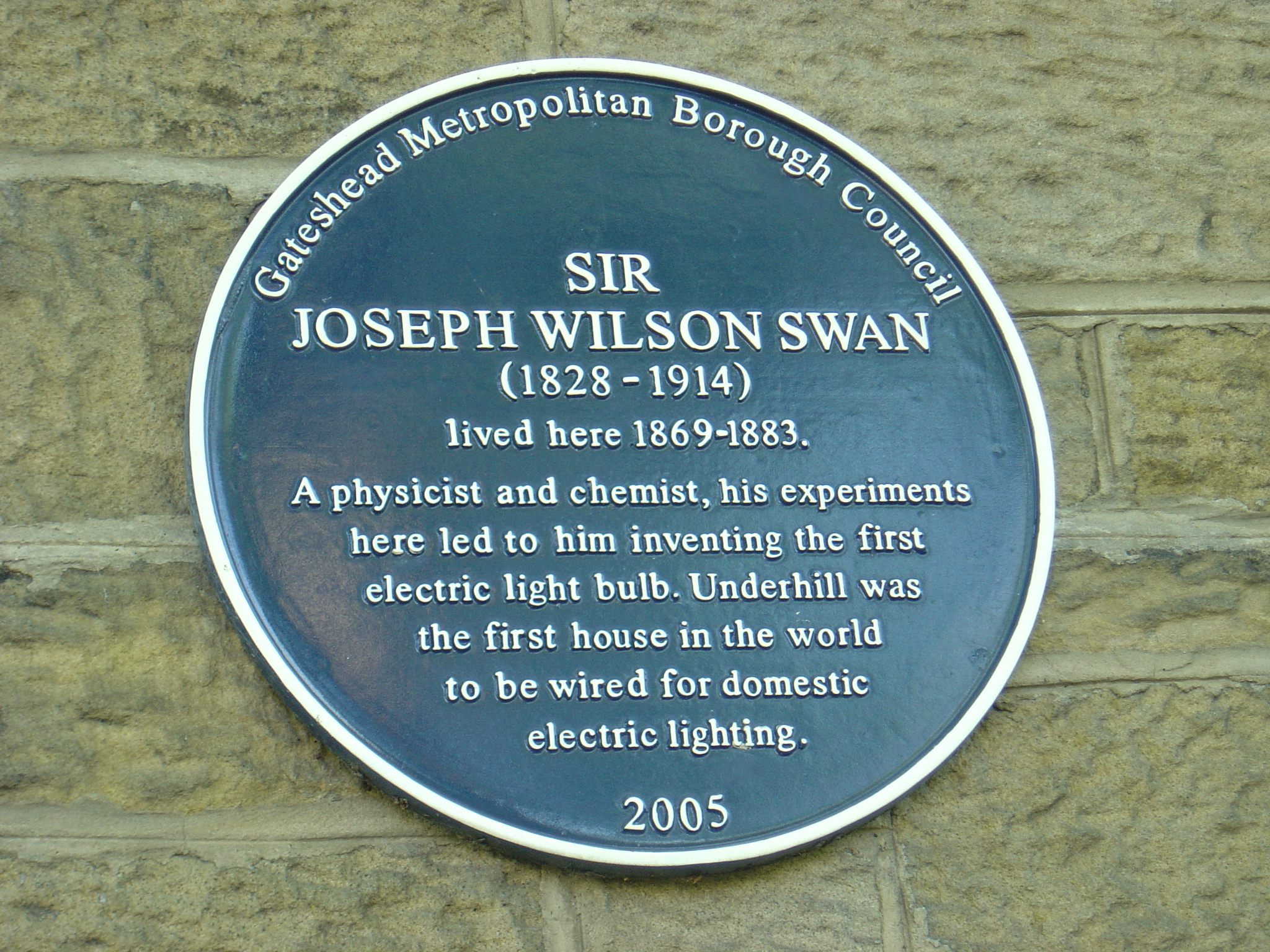
Blue plaque commemorates Swan's invention of the electric light bulb, and Underhill as the first house in the world to be wired for domestic electric lighting.

Underhill is a large and imposing detached house, located at 99 Kells Lane in the Low Fell district of Gateshead, England. Built primarily from sandstone in Victorian architectural style, it was the home of Sir Joseph Wilson Swan from 1869–83, and is the first domestic property in the world to be illuminated by electric light bulb.

In 1976 it was designated a Grade II* listed building.

Previously used as a school, it is currently used as retirement sheltered housing.

== See also ==
- Grade II* listed buildings in Tyne and Wear
