= Salisbury Singers =

English chamber music ensenmble

The Salisbury Singers, led by Leonard Salisbury, were a chamber music ensemble. They were managed by Ibbs and Tillett and headquartered at 3 Uffington Road in London.

== History ==
The British Musician and Musical News praised them in April 1929, writing:

The Salisbury Singers, easy and sonorous, phrase Morley's "Round about a wood" delicately, and they use some refined gradations of tone in Bishop's "Sleep gentle lady". Their pieces illustrate English partsongs of 1600 and 1800. A strong vocal quartet, joining the Debroy Somers Band, make an entertaining Community Medley, into which comes the ever-stirring "There is a Tavern in the Town".

On a Sunday in May 1925, they performed in an Organ Recital from the National Institute for the Blind, alongside H. G. Newell, Wynne Ajello and John Booth. This was described as "Broadcast Music", likely meaning it was broadcast on the radio.

In 1926 they were listed in Pierre Key's Music Yearbook. The Times advertised their concert on 5 February 1926.

The Musical Times of August 1926 criticized their vocal performance, stating,

The Salisbury Singers are unequal in the two items recorded on No. 3975. Their phrasing is very short in an over-harmonized version by Ivimey of "Drink to me only". The ending is too drawn out also.

=== 1930 concert at Sherborne ===
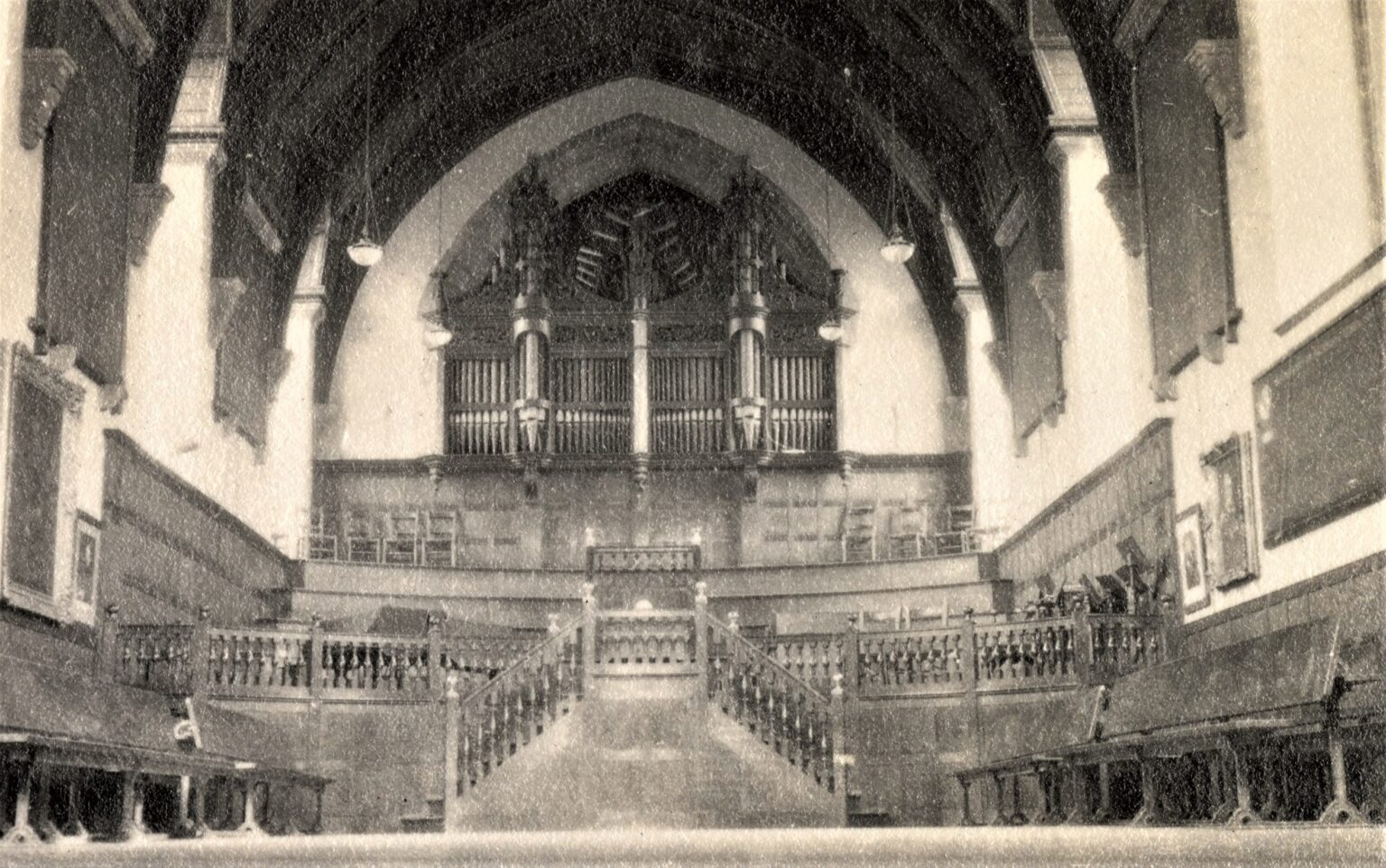
Christopher Morcom's photograph of the Big Schoolroom at Sherborne, where the Salisbury Singer's 1930 concert took place

On February 6 1930, the Salisbury Singers performed at the Sherborne School's Big Schoolroom in Dorset, England. They would sing a variety of songs as a quartet, duet, and trio, including:

- "The Cup Song" from The Rose of Persia,
- "To Celia" (a.k.a. "Drink Only to Me With Thine Eyes")
- "O Mistress Mine"
- "Wiegenlied" (a.k.a. "Cradle Song")
- "A British Tar" from H.M.S. Pinafore
- "D'ye ken John Peel"
- "Parson and Me" by Leonard Salisbury
- "The Watchman's Song" as a quartet

There, they would be seen by the student astronomer and prankster Christopher Morcom and his school friends. Morcom's friends in attendance likely included schoolmate Alan Turing, founder of modern computing. It was Morcom's last concert.

== Personnel ==
In 1926, the members were:

- Charles Hawkins – alto
- Gordon Ives – tenor
- Frank Hastell – baritone
- Leonard Salisbury – bass

In 1930, the members were:

- H. Charlesworth,
- G. Adams,
- F. Mercer,
- and Leonard Salisbury.
