= Patrick Mermagen =

English cricketer and school teacher

Personal information
- Full name: Patrick Hassell Frederick Mermagen
- Born: 8 May 1911; Colyton, Devon, England
- Died: 20 December 1984 (aged 73); Ipswich, Suffolk, England
- Batting: Right-handed
- Bowling: Right-arm fast-medium
- Role: Batsman

Domestic team information
- Years: Team
- 1930: Somerset
- First-class debut: 6 August 1930 Somerset v Essex
- Last First-class: 2 September 1930 Somerset v Hampshire

Career statistics
Competition	First-class
Matches	8
Runs scored	114
Batting average	11.40
100s/50s	–/–
Top score	35
Balls bowled	30
Wickets	–
Bowling average	–
5 wickets in innings	–
10 wickets in match	–
Best bowling	–
Catches/stumpings	4/–
- Source: CricketArchive, 13 November 2013

Patrick Hassell Frederick Mermagen (8 May 1911, Colyton, Devon – 20 December 1984 Ipswich, Suffolk) was a public school teacher and cricketer who played eight first-class matches for Somerset in 1930.

== Life and career ==
Patrick Mermagen was educated at Sherborne School in Dorset, southern England, where he was in the same year group as Alan Turing and Christopher Morcom. All three were mathematically able. An outstanding batsman for Sherborne, Mermagen was picked to play for the Public Schools side in the annual match against The Army at Lord's on 6 and 7 August 1930. But after the Army had batted on the Wednesday, rain set in and the match was abandoned.

Somerset's three-day game with Essex from 6 to 8 August was affected even earlier by the weather, and no play was possible on the Wednesday and the Thursday: when it finally began on the Friday, Mermagen had been inserted into the Somerset side and batted at No 4. Mermagen retained his place in the Somerset side for the rest of the season without making much impact: his highest score was only 35 and that came in his last innings, when Somerset scored 545 for nine declared against Hampshire at Taunton. He was a right-handed batsman and a right-arm fast-medium bowler, though he bowled only five overs in first-class cricket, without success.

Mermagen went to Pembroke College, Cambridge, in 1930 to study Mathematics, but did not play cricket for the university side. After graduating he spent six years as Assistant Master at Loretto School in Scotland, then served with the Royal Berkshire Regiment during World War II. After the war, he was Assistant Master at Radley College (1940–1950) and then headmaster of Ipswich School (1950–1972). Mermagen maintained contact with Alan Turing as a schoolmaster, via letter.

Patrick Mermagen died in 1984. He had married Neva Sonia James in 1934; they had a daughter and three sons, one of whom died in an air crash.
