= Joseph Swan =

British physicist and inventor (1828–1914)

Sir Joseph Swan FRS
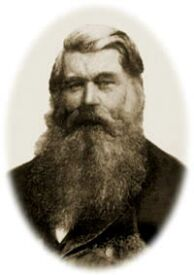
- Photograph of Swan, circa 1900
- Born: Joseph Wilson Swan; 31 October 1828; Bishopwearmouth, Sunderland, County Durham, England
- Died: 27 May 1914 (aged 85); Warlingham, Surrey, England
- Known for: Incandescent light bulb Photographic process
- Awards: Legion of Honour (1881); Hughes Medal (1904); Albert Medal (1906)
- Scientific career
- Fields: Physics, Chemistry

Sir Joseph Wilson Swan (31 October 1828 – 27 May 1914) was an English physicist, chemist, and inventor. He is known as an independent early developer of a successful incandescent light bulb, and is responsible for developing the first use of incandescent lights used to illuminate homes and public buildings, including the Savoy Theatre, London, in 1881.

In 1904, Swan was knighted by King Edward VII, awarded the Royal Society's Hughes Medal, and was made a member of the Pharmaceutical Society. He had received the highest decoration in France, the Legion of Honour, when he visited the 1881 International Exposition of Electricity, Paris. The exhibition included displays of his inventions, and the city was lit with his electric lighting.

== Biography ==
=== Early life ===
Joseph Wilson Swan was born in 1828 at Pallion Hall in Pallion, in the Parish of Bishopwearmouth, Sunderland, County Durham. His parents were John Swan and Isabella Cameron.

Swan was apprenticed for six years to a Sunderland firm of pharmacists/druggists, Hudson and Osbaldiston. However, it is not known whether Swan completed his six-year apprenticeship, as both partners subsequently died. He was said to have had an enquiring mind, even as a child. He augmented his education with a fascination for his surroundings, the industry of the area, and reading at Sunderland Library. He attended lectures at the Sunderland Atheneum.

Swan subsequently joined Mawson's, a firm of manufacturing chemists in Newcastle upon Tyne, started in the year of Swan's birth by John Mawson (9 September 1819 – 17 December 1867), the husband of his sister, Elizabeth Swan (22 November 1822 – 2 August 1905). In 1846, Swan was offered a partnership at Mawson's. This company subsequently existed as Mawson, Swan, and Morgan until 1973 (the store closed in 1986), formerly located on Grey Street in Newcastle upon Tyne, near Grey's Monument. The premises, now occupied by fashion retailer END., can be identified by a line of Victorian-style electric street lamps in front of the store on Grey Street.

Swan lived at Underhill, Low Fell, Gateshead, a large house on Kells Lane North, where he conducted most of his experiments in the large conservatory. The house was later converted into Beaconsfield School, a private fee-paying grant-aided co-educational grammar school. Students there could still find examples of Swan's original electrical fittings.

=== Electric light ===
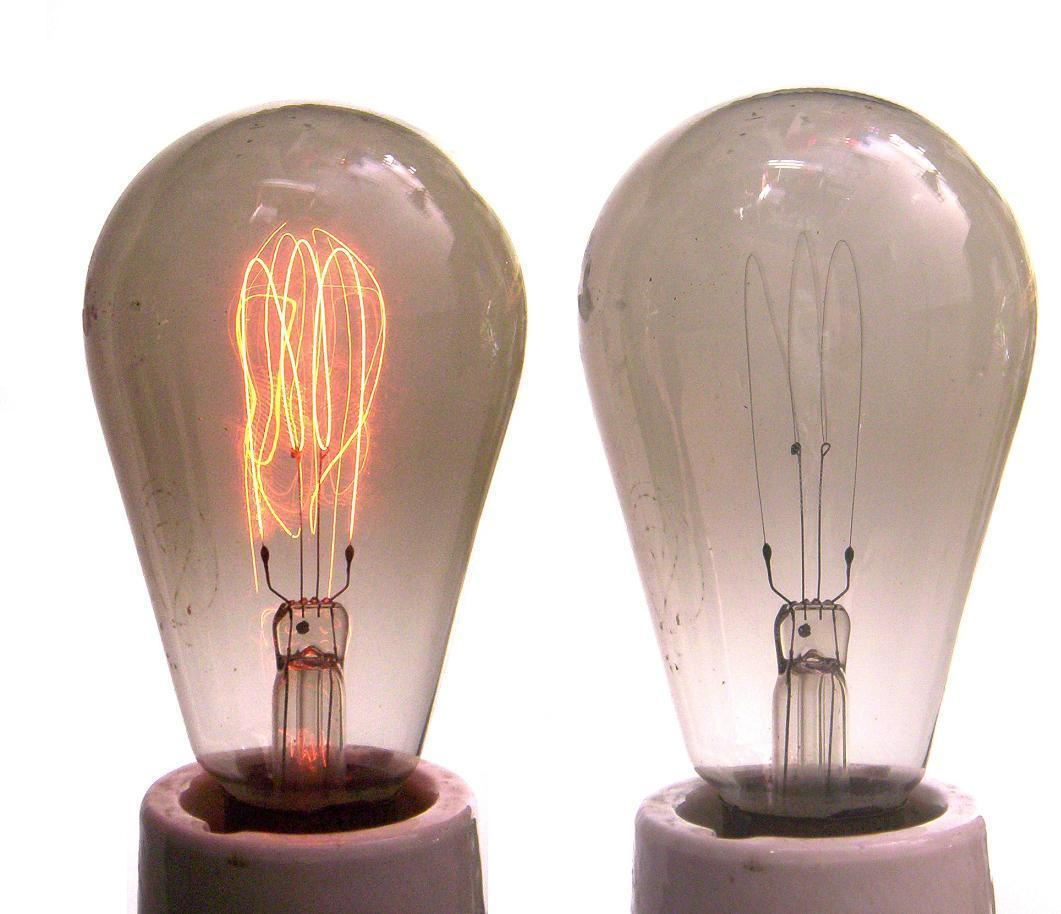
Carbon filament lamp (E27 socket, 220 volts, approx. 30 watts, left side: running with 100 volts)

In 1850, Swan began working on a light bulb using carbonised paper filaments in an evacuated glass bulb. By 1860, he was able to demonstrate a working device, but the lack of a good vacuum, and of an adequate electric source, resulted in an inefficient light bulb with a short life. In August 1863 he presented his own design for a vacuum pump to a meeting of the British Association for the Advancement of Science. The design used mercury falling through a tube to trap air from the system to be evacuated. Swan's design was similar in construction to the Sprengel pump and predates Herman Sprengel's research by two years. Furthermore, it is notable that Sprengel conducted his research while visiting London, and was probably aware of the annual reports of the British Association for the Advancement of Science. Nonetheless, Joseph Swan and Thomas Edison are later reported to have used the Sprengel pump to evacuate their carbon filament lamps.

In 1875, Swan returned to consider the problem of the light bulb with the aid of a better vacuum and a carbonised thread as a filament. The most significant feature of Swan's improved lamp was that there was little residual oxygen in the vacuum tube to ignite the filament, thus allowing the filament to glow almost white-hot without catching fire. However, his filament had low resistance, thus needing heavy copper wires to supply it.

Swan first publicly demonstrated his incandescent carbon lamp at a lecture for the Newcastle upon Tyne Chemical Society on 18 December 1878. However, after burning with a bright light for some minutes in his laboratory, the lamp broke down owing to excessive current. On 17 January 1879 this lecture was successfully repeated with the lamp shown in actual operation; Swan had solved the problem of incandescent electric lighting by means of a vacuum lamp. On 3 February 1879 he publicly demonstrated a working lamp to an audience of over seven hundred people in the lecture theatre of the Literary and Philosophical Society of Newcastle upon Tyne, Sir William Armstrong of Cragside presiding. Swan turned his attention to producing a better carbon filament, and the means of attaching its ends. He devised a method of treating cotton to produce "parchmentised thread", and obtained British Patent 4933 on 27 November 1880. From that time he began installing light bulbs in homes and landmarks in England.

His house, Underhill, Low Fell, Gateshead, was the world's first to have working light bulbs installed. The Lit & Phil Library in Westgate Road, Newcastle, was the first public room lit by electric light during a lecture by Swan on 20 October 1880. In 1881 he founded his own company, The Swan Electric Light Company, and started commercial production.

The Savoy, a state-of-the-art theatre in the City of Westminster, London, was the first public building in the world lit entirely by electricity. Swan supplied about 1,200 incandescent lamps, powered by an 88.3-kilowatt (118.4-horsepower) generator on open land near the theatre. The builder of the Savoy, Richard D'Oyly Carte, explained why he had introduced Swan's electric light: "The greatest drawbacks to the enjoyment of the theatrical performances are, undoubtedly, the foul air and heat which pervade all theatres. As everyone knows, each gas-burner consumes as much oxygen as many people, and causes great heat beside. The incandescent lamps consume no oxygen, and cause no perceptible heat." The first generator proved too small to power the whole building, and though the entire front-of-house was electrically lit, the stage was lit by gas until 28 December 1881. At that performance, Carte stepped on stage and broke a glowing lightbulb before the audience to demonstrate the safety of Swan's new technology. On 29 December 1881, The Times described the electric lighting as visually superior to gaslight.

The first private residence, other than the inventor's, lit by the new incandescent lamp was that of his friend, Sir William Armstrong at Cragside, near Rothbury, Northumberland. Swan personally supervised the installation there in December 1880. Swan had formed "The Swan Electric Light Company Ltd" with a factory at Benwell, Newcastle, and had established the first commercial manufacture of incandescent lightbulbs by the beginning of 1881.

Swan's carbon rod lamp and carbon filament lamp, while functional, were still relatively impractical owing to low resistance (needing very expensive thick copper wiring) and short running life. While searching for a better filament for his light bulb, Swan inadvertently made another advance. In 1881, he developed and patented a process for squeezing nitrocellulose through holes to form conducting fibres. His newly established company (which by merger eventually became the Edison and Swan United Company) used Swan's cellulose filaments in their bulbs. The textile industry has also used this process.

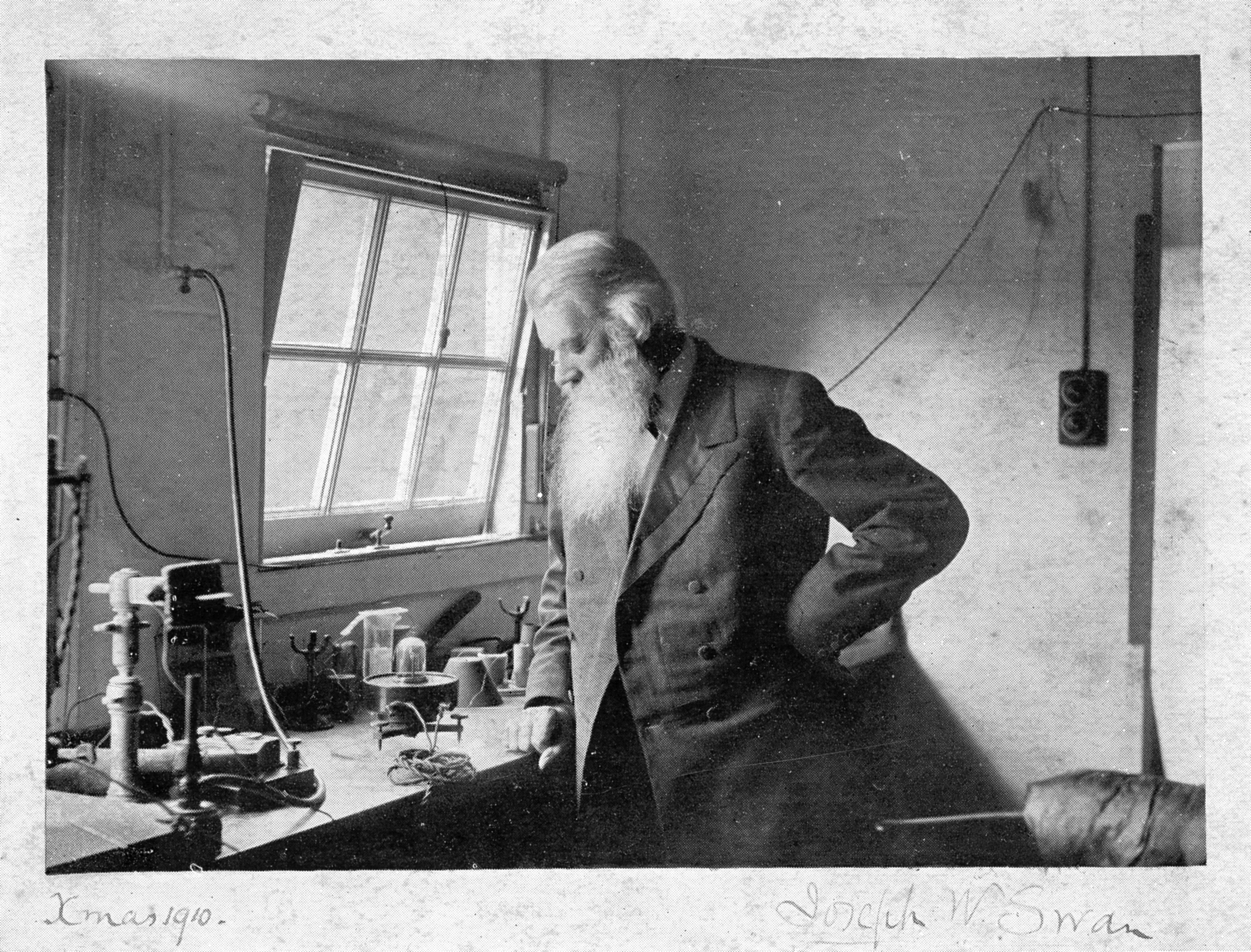
Portrait of Swan in his laboratory (pre 1907), signed by Swan in 1910

The first ship to use Swan's invention was The City of Richmond, owned by the Inman Line. She was fitted with incandescent lamps in June 1881. The Royal Navy also introduced them to its ships soon after; with HMS Inflexible having the new lamps installed in the same year. An early employment in engineering was during the digging of the Severn Tunnel, where the contractor Thomas Walker installed "20-candlepower lamps" in the temporary pilot tunnels.

Swan was one of the early developers of the electric safety lamp for miners, exhibiting his first in Newcastle upon Tyne at the North of England Institute of Mining and Mechanical Engineers on 14 May 1881. This required a wired supply, so the following year, he presented one with a battery and other improved versions followed. By 1886, a lamp with better light output than a flame safety lamp was in production by the Edison-Swan Company. However, it suffered from problems of reliability and was not a success. It took development by others over the next 20 years or so before effective electric lamps were in common use.

=== Conjunction with Edison ===
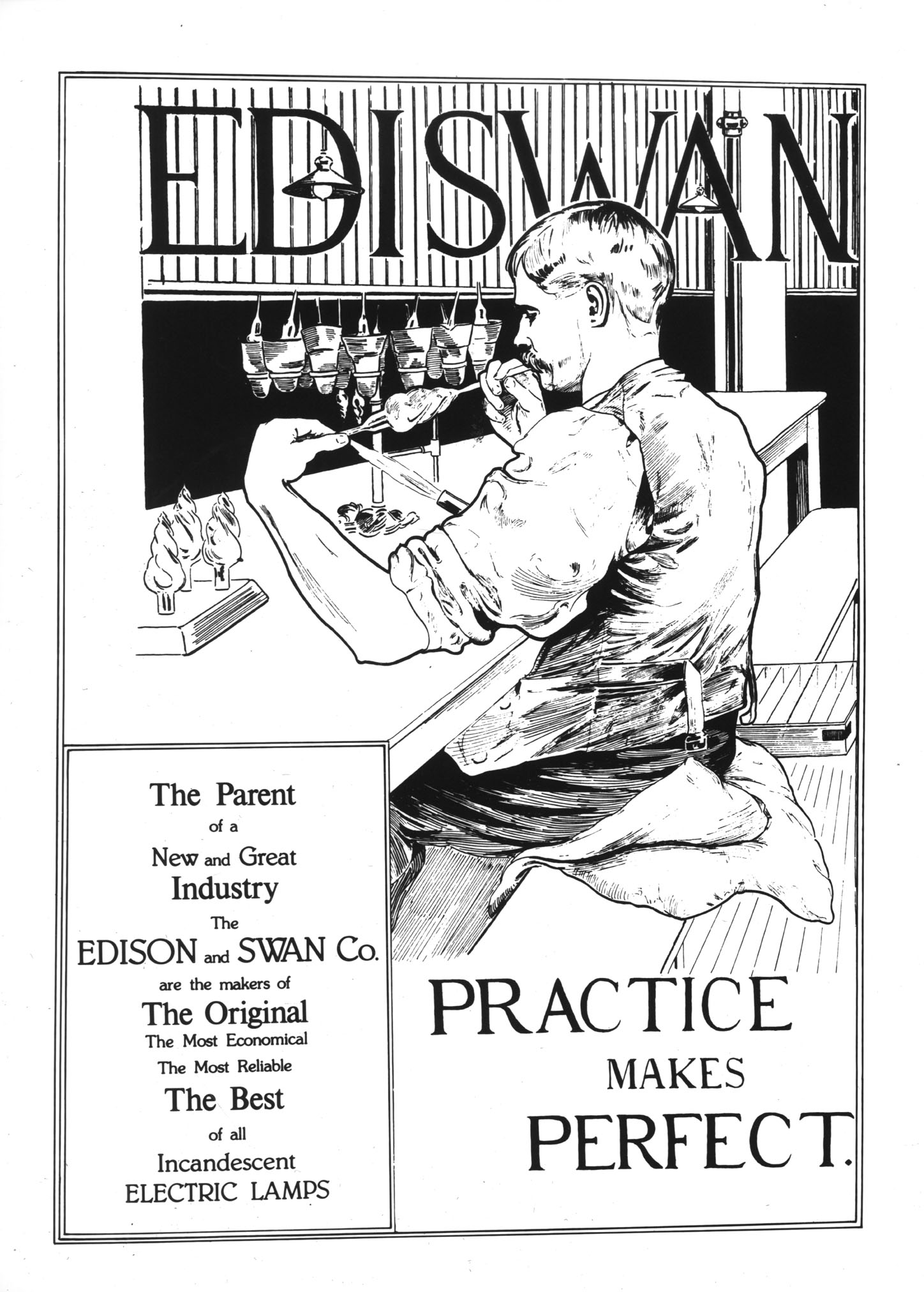
Edison & Swan United Electric Light Company, otherwise known as "Ediswan"

In what are considered to be independent lines of inquiry, Swan's incandescent electric lamp was developed at the same time that Thomas Edison was working on his incandescent lamp, with Swan's first successful lamp and Edison's lamp both patented in 1880. Edison's goal in developing his lamp was for it to be used as one part of a much larger system: a long-life high-resistance lamp that could be connected in parallel to work economically with the large-scale electric-lighting utility he was creating. Swan's original lamp design, with its low resistance (the lamp could be used only in series) and short life span, was not suited for such an application. Swan's strong patents in Great Britain led, in 1883, to the two competing companies merging to exploit both Swan's and Edison's inventions, with the establishment of the Edison & Swan United Electric Light Company. Known commonly as "Ediswan", the company sold lamps made with a cellulose filament that Swan had invented in 1881, while the Edison Company continued using bamboo filaments outside of Britain. In 1892, General Electric (GE) began exploiting Swan's patents to produce cellulose filaments, until they were replaced in 1904 by a GE developed "General Electric Metallized" (GEM) baked cellulose filaments.

In 1886, Ediswan moved production to a former jute mill at Ponders End, North London. In 1916, Ediswan set up the UK's first radio thermionic valve factory at Ponders End. This area, with nearby Brimsdown subsequently developed as a centre for the manufacture of thermionic valves, cathode-ray tubes, etc., and nearby parts of Enfield became an important centre of the electronics industry for much of the 20th century. Ediswan became part of British Thomson-Houston and Associated Electrical Industries (AEI) in the late 1920s.

=== Photography ===
When working with wet photographic plates, Swan noticed that heat increased the sensitivity of the silver bromide emulsion. By 1871, he had devised a method of using dry plates, and substituting nitrocellulose plastic for glass plates, thus initiating the age of convenience in photography. Eight years later, he patented bromide paper, developments of which are still used for black-and-white photographic prints.

In 1864, Swan, via the introduction of carbon tissue, patented the transfer process for making carbon prints a permanent photographic process. By adding the transfer step, Swan was able to easily make photographs with a full tonal range. He subsequently sold his patents to the Autotype Company of London in 1868.

=== Family ===
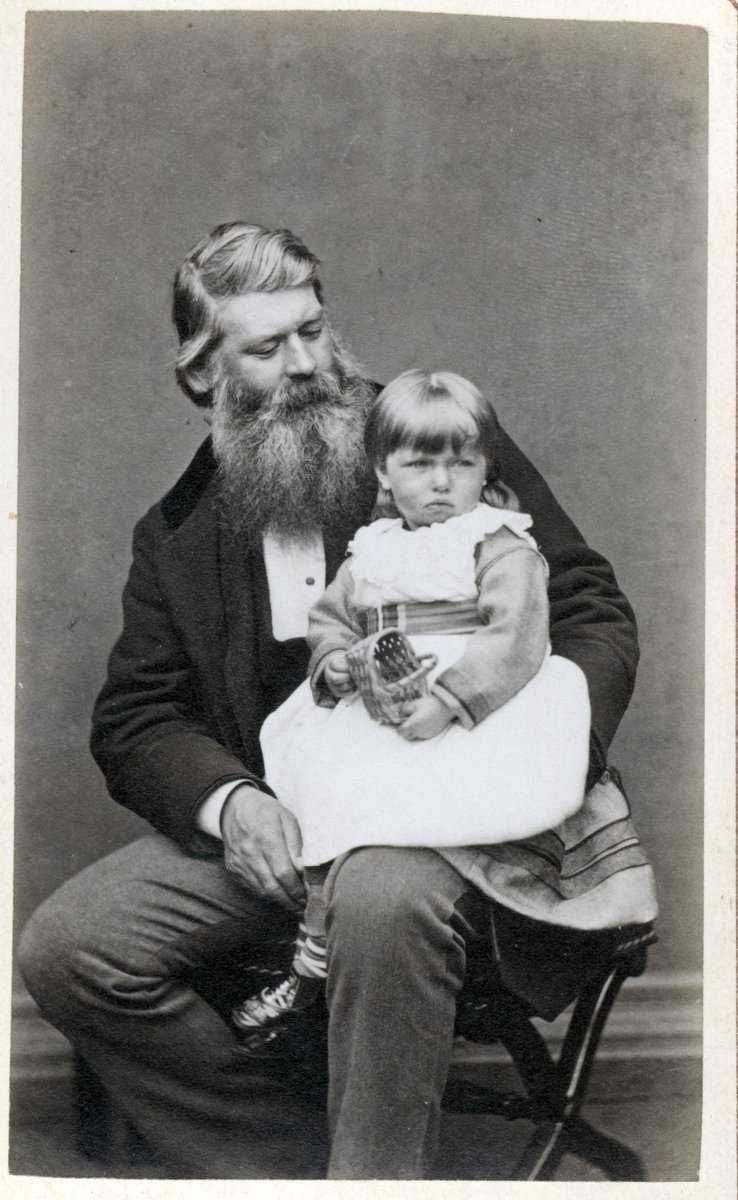
Swan in 1880 with his daughter, Frances Isobel, who became a sculptor and artist

Swan married firstly Frances "Fanny" White, third daughter of William White, of Liverpool, at Camberwell Chapel, London, on 31 July 1862. They had three surviving children: Cameron, Mary Edmonds, and Joseph Henry. Frances died on 9 January 1868 and he married secondly Hannah White, the younger sister of Frances, at Neuchâtel, Switzerland, on 3 October 1871. They had five children: Hilda, Frances Isobel, Kenneth Rayden, Percival, and Dorothy. Sir Kenneth Rayden Swan was a QC and an acknowledged authority on patent law.

Frances Isobel Swan was a sculptor and artist, active between 1895 and 1903. Frances Isobel was also the mother of Christopher Collan Morcom, a friend of Alan Turing at Sherborne School. Like his grandfather, Christopher was exceptionally gifted in the sciences (particularly astronomy), though he was also a notable prankster, photographer, and student athlete. After Christopher's premature death in 1930, Frances Isobel and Turing began exchanging letters. Turing became a close family friend of the Morcom family, visiting the Clock House in 1932.

=== Honours ===
In 1904, Swan was knighted, awarded the Royal Society's Hughes Medal, and made an honorary member of the Pharmaceutical Society. He had received the highest decoration in France, the Legion of Honour, in recognition for his invention of the electric light bulb after showing it in an exhibition in Paris in 1881. In 1906, he received the Albert medal of the Royal Society of Arts.

In 1894, Swan was elected a Fellow of the Royal Society (FRS), and in 1898 he was elected president of the Institution of Electrical Engineers; at the time, Swan was one of its three honorary members, the other two being Lord Kelvin and Henry Wilde. In 1901, he was awarded the honorary degree of Doctor of Science (D.Sc.) from Durham University. He also served as president of the Society of Chemical Industry from 1900–1901, and in 1903 he was chosen first president of the Faraday Society.

== Legacy ==
Stone tablet of Swan in Pilgrim Street, Newcastle upon Tyne, on the former Electricity Board building

Swan died in 1914 at his home in Overhill, Warlingham, Surrey. The funeral took place at All Saints' Church, Warlingham, on 30 May 1914, with interment taking place in the churchyard. Mourners included representatives of the Institution of Electrical Engineers, the Institution of Mechanical Engineers, and the Royal Society.

In 1924, Frances Isobel gifted a bronze statue she created of her late father to The Literary & Philosophical Society of Newcastle in Newcastle upon Tyne.

In 1945, the London Power Company commemorated Swan by naming a new 1,554 GRT coastal collier SS Sir Joseph Swan.

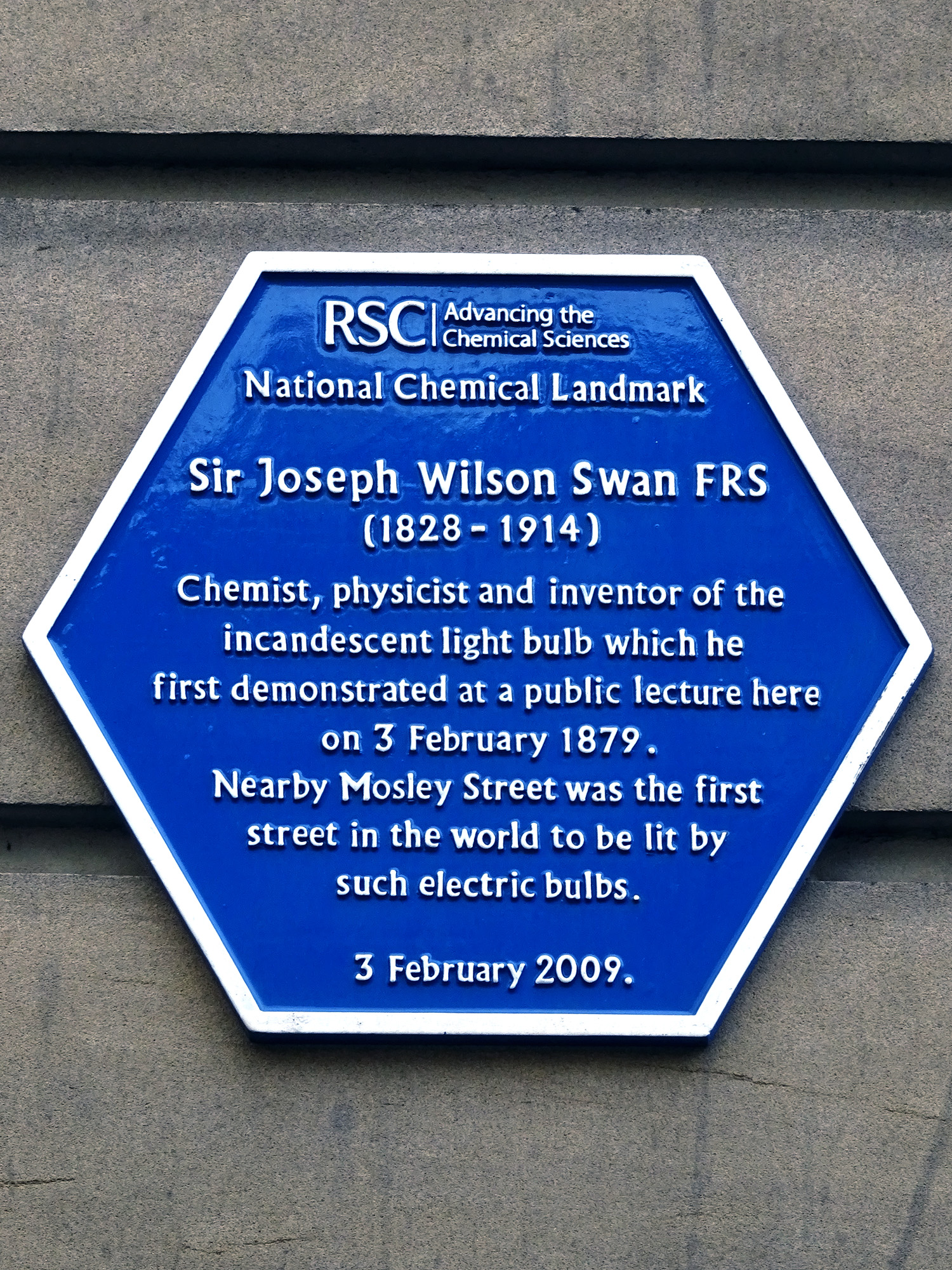
Plaque at 23 Westgate Road, Newcastle, where Swan publicly demonstrated the electric light bulb in 1879

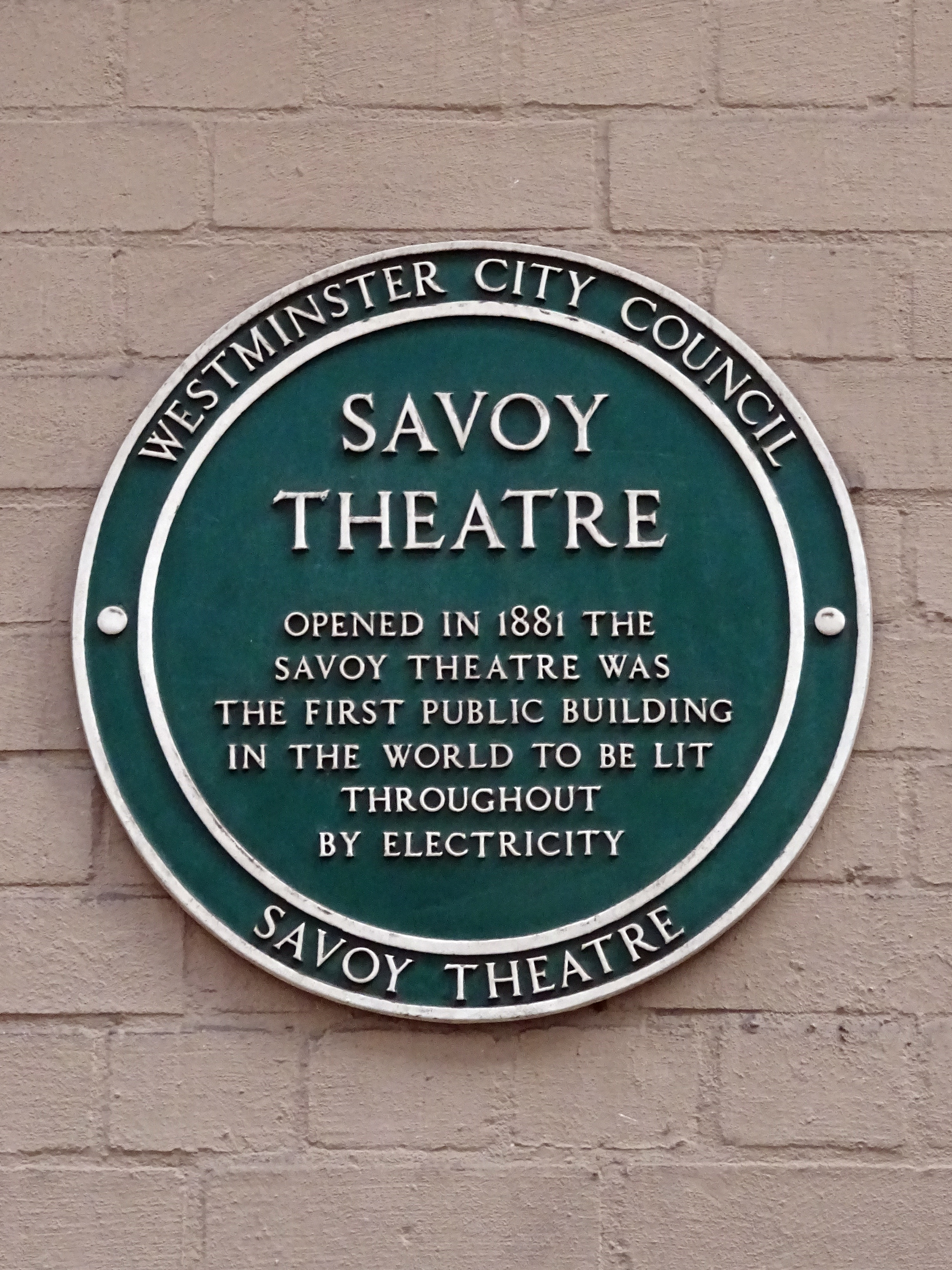
Plaque at the Savoy Theatre in London noting it as the first public building to be lit entirely by electricity in 1881

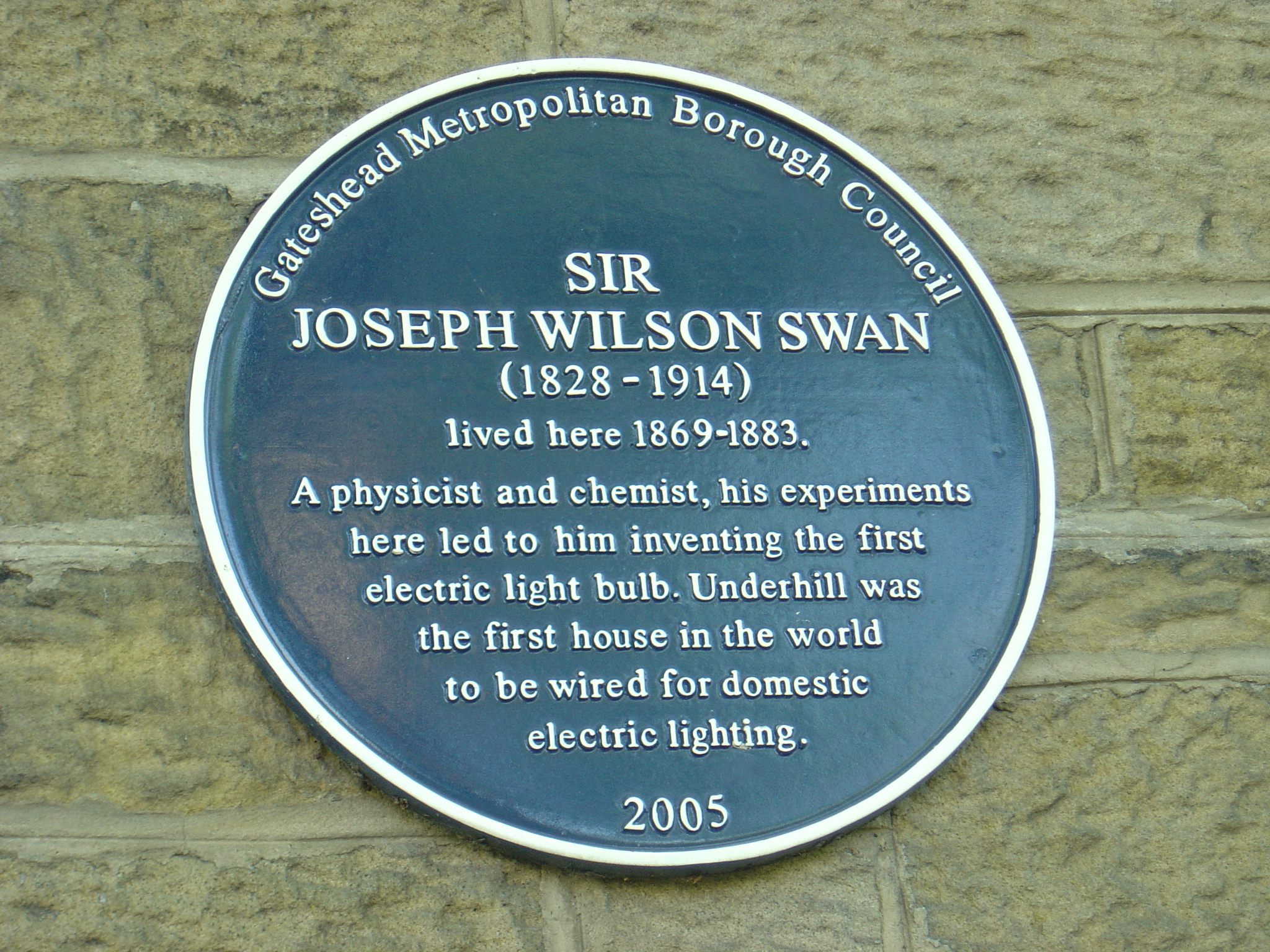
Plaque at Underhill, Gateshead commemorating Swan's invention and Underhill as the first house in the world to have electric lighting installed

== See also ==
- History of the light bulb
- List of English inventors and designers
