= Peter Hogg (ornithologist) =

English ornithologist

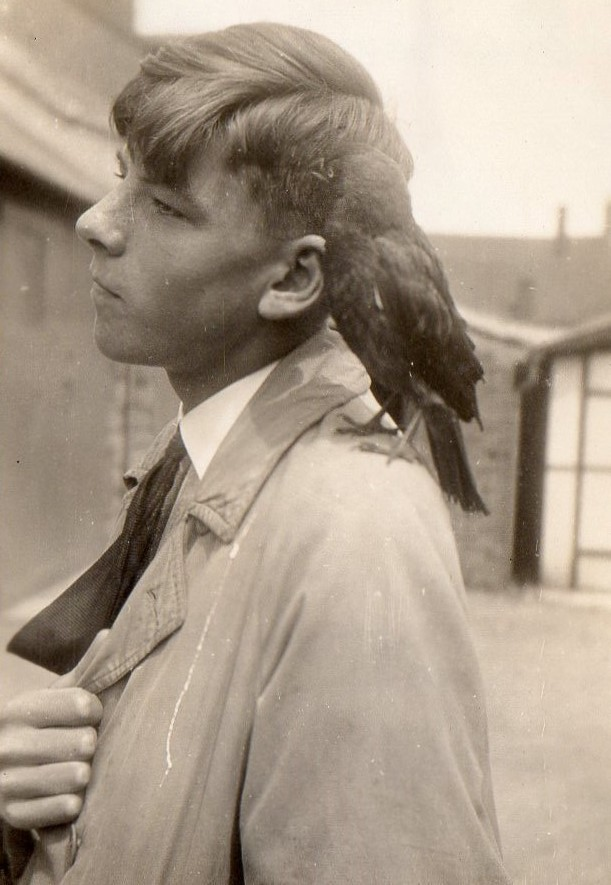
- Hogg with his pet jackdaw circa 1929
- Born: 1913
- Died: June 1, 2000 (aged 86–87)
- Other names: Slogger Hogg; The Smiley One
- Education: Sherborne School; New College, Oxford
- Occupation: Anglo-Egyptian Sudanese District Commissioner
- Known for: Friendship with Alan Turing and Christopher Morcom

Peter Hogg (1913–2000), nicknamed Slogger Hogg and The Smiley One, was an ornithologist, rower, Anglo-Egyptian Sudanese District Commissioner, and Sherborne School graduate.

From 1957 until his death, Hogg was a member of the British Ornithologists' Club, on which he served as a Committee Member, Vice Chairman, and Chairman during his 43 years of involvement.

He is most notable for his friendships with Alan Turing and Christopher Morcom.

== Biography ==
=== Early childhood ===
Peter Hogg was born in Surrey, England in 1913. For an unknown period of time, he and his family lived in Egypt, where most of his childhood was spent. Like his father, he was a naturalist who specialized in wild birds.

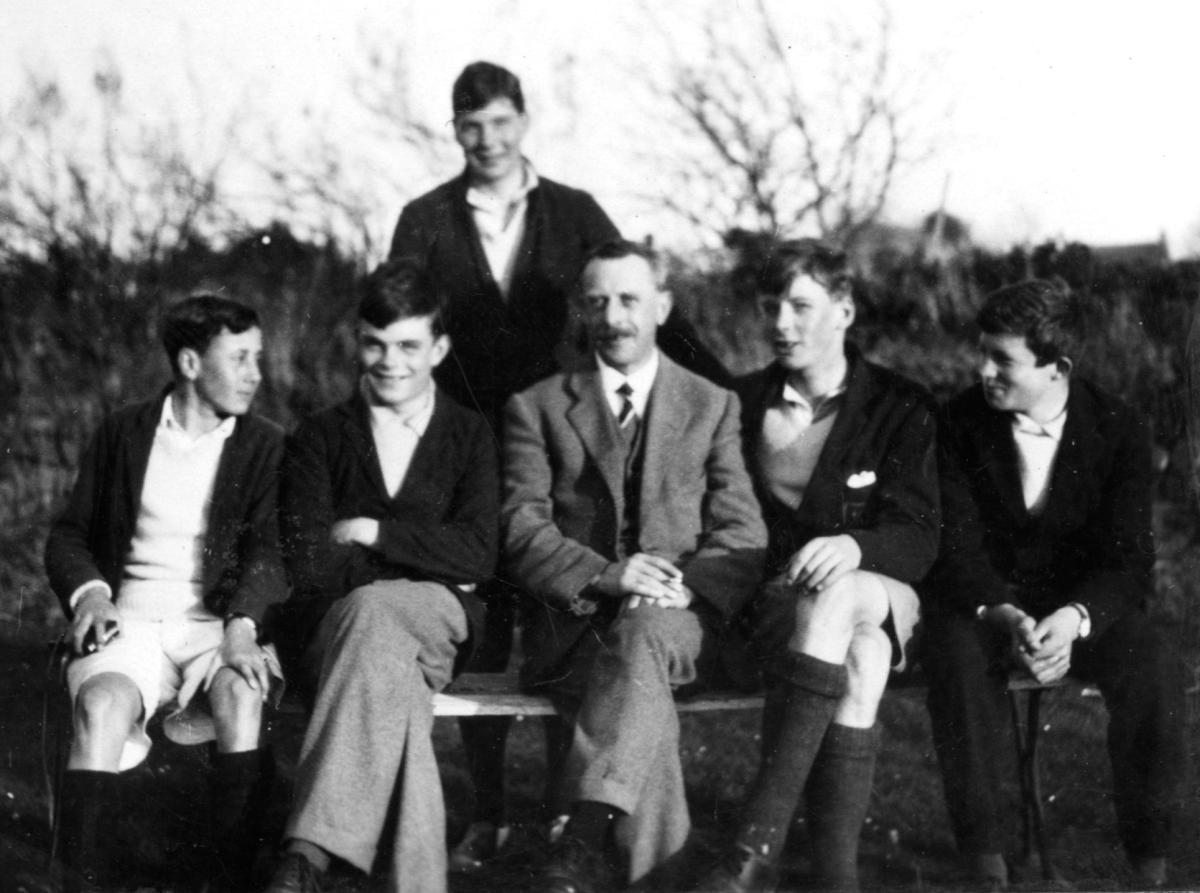
Peter Hogg (second from right) in Cornwall, April 1930, with friend Alan Turing (seated, second from left), Edwin Davis, John Bennett, Peter White, and Duncan Carse

=== Education ===
Circa 1925, when he was 12 years old, he was getting ready to move from prep school to Sherborne, when his mother died. According to Reverend William Hogg, his interest in birding and naturalism helped Hogg grieve the death of his mother.

He was a member of the Westcott House at Sherborne in September 1926. He enjoyed swimming, sailing, and adventuring with Geoffrey O'Hanlon, his housemaster. He was also a Class Leader, CSM in the University Officer Training Corps, member of Duffers, and editor of The Shiburnian school paper.

Circa 1929, he was photographed with his pet jackdaw. The following year, he was pictured in Rock, Cornwall alongside Alan Turing, Edwin Davis, John Bennet, Peter White, and Duncan Carse.

He appears in footage of circa 1930 Sherborne, where amateur candid footage shows him sleeping during an Officer Training Corps encampment at Salisbury Plain. It is possible that this candid footage was taken by childhood friend Christopher Morcom.

In 1930, O'Hanlon took Hogg and friend Alan Turing on a planned a trail hike. They walked from Okeford Fitzpaine to Bell Hill, Belchalwell, Bulbarrow, Rawlsbury Camp, Ansty, and finally concluded at Dorsetshire Gap where they discussed how the area would be a safe undistinguished meeting place "smugglers who might land their freight at Lulworth Cove or Worbarrow Bay". This journey was detailed in O'Hanlon's By-Ways in Dorset. Recollections of the Twenties.

On March 11, 1930, he participated in the senior inter-house steeplechase horse race along with Alan Turing, who finished 10th, the first of the Westcotts. The senior race that year was won by George Laws of The Green.

In March 1931, Peter Hogg went on a hike ("walking holiday") in Norfolk with Alan Turing and classmate George Maclure. Hogg also joined Turing and O'Hanlon on another hike in September of the same year.

He graduated from Sherborne in July 1931 with the Marson Greek and Greek Prose Prizes. O'Hanlon also wrote to him that year and let him know he and Alan Turing had received the Goodman Scholarship.

After Sherborne, he attended New College, Oxford, where he rowed for the Oxford University Boat Race in 1933 and 1934.

In 1934, he rowed for the Leander Club in the men's eights, winning the Grand Challenge Cup.

=== Career ===
In 1935, after graduating from Oxford, he trained for the Sudan Political Service, an administrative section in Anglo-Egyptian Sudan. After studying Arabic and Administration, he served in the SPS between 1935 and 1955. He was first an Assistant District Commissioner.

Circa 1936, he wrote a letter to his former Sherborne housemaster Geoffrey O'Hanlon from Kordofan. O'Hanlon mentions this in a letter of that year to Alan Turing.

In 1954, he was promoted to Director of Local Government in the Khartoum.

In the early 1950s, he married Joanna Hardy and had two children in Sudan: William and Meg. The family lived in Sudan until 1955.

Upon moving back to England in 1955, he declined a job at an outdoor centre and began a more high-paying career at the Personnel Department of BP in London. He continued to enjoy birdwatching, photography, sports, and hiking in his leisure time. In his 1956 book Still the Joy of It, former Sherborne schoolmaster Littleton Charles Powys (1874–1955) mentioned Hogg as a friend:

I remember another day in June, sometime before the war, when I was down on the cricket field, watching some sort of cricket match, and by my side was a friend of mine, Peter Hogg, whom I had known as a naturalist in his school days.

In 1959, he received a biography of Alan Turing from his mother, E. S. Turing. He thanked her and stated that he was unaware of the ideas and discoveries Turing was making when they attended Sherborne together, since Hogg described himself as "useless" at mathematics. He told her he went to see BP's computer and was amazed by Turing's invention.

=== Retirement ===
After retirement in 1973, he volunteered with Kea Conservation Trust, the St. Peter and St. Paul parish church of Seal in Sevenoaks, and the rowing event Henley Royal Regatta. He invited friends and family to his house and garden in Sevenoaks.

In 1995, he co-wrote A Black Corps d'Elite: An Egyptian Sudanese Conscript Battalion with the French Army in Mexico, 1863-1867, and its Survivors in Subsequent African History with Richard Hill.

=== Birding ===
In 1957, Peter Hogg joined the British Ornithologists' Club. He would be a member for 43 years. Between 1962—1966 and 1972—1974, he served on the Committee, before becoming Vice Chairman (1974—1977) and later Chairman (1977—1980).

In 1969, Hogg wrote and published "Libyan Birds of Mountain & Desert", along with 3 photographs. It was featured in British magazine Country Life. Hogg's photographs show a lanner falcon with its young, the oasis at Kufra, and a salt-marsh in the Kufra oasis.

In 1974, after his retirement, he published Trans-Saharan Migration Through Sarir, 1969–70, which gave an account of ecological observations made at the BP Bunker Hunt Oil Production Centre at Sarir in the Libyan Sahara. It described the passage of Palearctic migrants in spring 1969 and 1970 and in part of autumn 1996. 70 avian species were observed and mapped, as well as weather conditions, with 57 other species mentioned. Unusual birds for the region that appeared included robins, blackbird, greenfinch, black-headed bunting, and rosy starling.

Circa 1980, he shared field notes and data with a member of the Southern African Ornithological Society (possibly D. N. Johnson), enabling the member to write a research paper that was mentioned in Proceedings of the Fourth Pan-African Ornithological Congress.

=== Death ===
He experienced grief when Joanna died in 1992, but remarried Jane Stephens with whom he spent the last years of his life.

Likely his last birding trip was in 1999 to Sri Lanka. He went with Nick Antcliff, Barry Stidolph, and Ian Mills, who documented the trip. 223 bird species were observed by the quartet.

The following year, Hogg died on June 1, 2000, and his last words were "God bless". That year, the Ornithologists' Club had a moment of silence in his honor.

== See also ==
- List of Old Shirburnians
- List of ornithologists
- List of people associated with New College, Oxford
