= Amanda Root =

English actress (born 1963)

- Born: Chelmsford, Essex, England
- Education: Webber Douglas Academy of Dramatic Art
- Occupation: Actress
- Years active: 1983–present
- Spouse: Nawtej Dosangh

Amanda Root (born 1963) is a British actress. She is perhaps best known for her starring role as Anne Elliot in the 1995 BBC adaptation of Persuasion. A familiar face on both stage and screen, she worked regularly with the Royal Shakespeare Company during her early career, performing as Juliet in Romeo and Juliet, and Lady Macbeth in Macbeth, among other roles. In 2009, she was nominated for a Tony Award for Best Featured Actress in a Play for her performance as Sarah in Alan Ayckbourn's The Norman Conquests.

Her film roles include The Iron Lady (2011), Their Finest (2016), The Black Prince (2017) and Summerland (2020). Root is also known for her television roles, including Dolly in Anna Karenina (2000), Mrs Davilow in Daniel Deronda (2002), and Winifred Dartie in The Forsyte Saga (2002−2003). In 2018, she played Carol Finch in ITV crime drama Unforgotten (2018), and in 2023, she portrayed Sue Farquhar in BBC drama The Sixth Commandment (2023).

== Life and career ==
Root was born in Chelmsford, Essex, to Ken and Maureen Root. Her father was an accountant, whilst her mother had performed in amateur dramatic productions as a child. Both were supportive of her ambitions to become an actor. She attended Philip Morant School in Colchester, studying drama at O Level; she joined the Essex Youth Theatre as a teenager. After graduating from the Webber Douglas Academy of Dramatic Art, she began her career at the Leeds Playhouse in 1983 when she played Essie in George Bernard Shaw's The Devil's Disciple.

She was a remarkably complete actress even in her early twenties, when physically she looked little more than a child. With her dark soulful eyes she could command a stage, and the Royal Shakespeare Company saw her talent very early on.

She worked regularly with the RSC in Stratford-upon-Avon and London from 1983 to 1991, including playing the role of Juliet to Daniel Day-Lewis's Romeo; a very young Lady Macbeth; Cressida to Ralph Fiennes's Troilus, and Rosaline to his Berowne. She also appeared as Jessica opposite Ian McDiarmid's Shylock in The Merchant of Venice.

In 1985, Root made her television debut in the pilot episode of Ladies in Charge, as one of a trio of women setting up an agency to help others in postwar London. She then starred as the title character in Mary Rose, a television drama based on the play by J.M. Barrie. In 1988, she featured as the Storyteller in five episodes of children's series Jackanory, and the following year voiced Sophie in animated feature The BFG. The film was aired on ITV on Christmas Day. In 1991, she reprised her role as Adela in a Channel 4 adaptation of The House of Bernarda Alba alongside Glenda Jackson, having originally played the character in a 1986 stage production at the Lyric Hammersmith. She also starred as Nina in Chekhov's The Seagull at the Barbican Theatre. In 1993, Root played Hilda Maxwell in ITV period drama The Man Who Cried, opposite Ciarán Hinds. The series, adapted from the novel by Catherine Cookson, received positive reviews and was watched by 12.7 million viewers.

In 1994, she appeared in a BBC comedy mini-series Love on a Branch Line as an ostensibly "mousy" secretary, Miss Mounsey, who, ultimately throwing off her apparent reticence, landed the leading character, Jasper Pye (Michael Maloney). That same year, Root was sought by the actress Emma Thompson for the role of Marianne in Sense and Sensibility, based on the 1811 novel by Jane Austen. She participated in a read-through in London with the cast but was unable to take on the role (it would later go to Kate Winslet) as she had already committed to star as Anne Elliot in another Austen adaptation, Persuasion. The film, made by the BBC for drama anthology series Screen Two, reunited Root with Ciarán Hinds, who played Captain Wentworth. It was broadcast on BBC Two in April 1995, and later gained a limited cinematic release in the United States, grossing over five million dollars. Well received by critics, it went on to win five TV BAFTAs, including for Best Single Drama. In 1996, she played Patricia "Pat" Green in Breaking the Code. Root's character was inspired by Bletchley code-breaker Joan Clarke, and starred Derek Jacobi as Alan Turing.

In 1998, Root starred in BBC crime drama Mortimer's Law, as Rachel Mortimer, a barrister who relocates to rural Wales to take up a vacant coroner's post. The series ran for six episodes but was not recommissioned. In 2000, she played Dolly in Anna Karenina, and later appeared as Mrs. Davilow in Daniel Deronda. That same year, Root returned to the stage in Yasmina Reza's Conversations After a Burial at the Almeida Theatre. She also made guest appearances in various crime dramas, including A Touch of Frost, Foyle's War, Waking the Dead, Poirot and Midsomer Murders. In 2004, she appeared in ten episodes of period drama The Forsyte Saga as Winifred Dartie. The following year, she featured in the docudrama Julian Fellowes Investigates, playing murder victim Vera Sidney. In 2006, she portrayed Alice Hoschede, wife of Impressionist painter Claude Monet, in the BBC miniseries The Impressionists. She also made her third appearance at the Almeida Theatre as Polina Bardin in Enemies by Maxim Gorky, in a new interpretation by David Hare.

In 2008, Root was cast as Sarah in Alan Ayckbourn's The Norman Conquests. It was first staged at the Old Vic Theatre in London, before making its Broadway transfer to the Circle in the Square Theatre in New York. The production, directed by Matthew Warchus, was positively received by critics, and gained seven Tony nominations, winning Best Revival. Root was nominated for Best Featured Actress in a Play; her performance was described as "remarkable" by The New York Times. The cast were also nominated for an Olivier Award for Best Company Performance.

In 2011, she starred as Hester Collyer in a stage production of The Deep Blue Sea at the Chichester Festival Theatre. She also played Amanda in Margaret Thatcher biopic The Iron Lady opposite Meryl Streep and continued to make further guest appearances in television crime dramas, such as DCI Banks, The Tunnel and Death in Paradise. In 2016, she appeared as Cecy in wartime comedy drama Their Finest. In 2017, Root featured in an episode of hit BBC drama Sherlock as Emma Welsborough. Later that same year, she starred as Queen Victoria in historical drama The Black Prince; the film explored the complex relationship between Victoria and Duleep Singh, the last Maharajah of the Sikh Empire. In 2018, she played Carol Finch in six episodes of ITV drama Unforgotten, and Virginia Scott-Watson in Patrick Melrose. On stage, she played governess Miss Madrigal in a Chichester Festival Theatre production of The Chalk Garden. In 2020, she appeared on television in popular BBC drama Call the Midwife and ITV thriller miniseries The Sister, and on film in British drama Summerland as social worker Mrs Lawrence.

In 2021, she played Sister Brumfett in one episode of Dalgliesh. The following year, she played Cynthia in a film adaptation of Alan Bennett's 2018 play Allelujah!. She also appeared in BBC mystery thriller The Capture. In 2023, Root featured in two episodes of romantic comedy drama series You & Me. She also had a supporting role in true-life crime drama The Sixth Commandment, based on the murder of Peter Farquhar. Root played Farquhar's sister-in-law Sue Farquhar. In 2024, she featured in three episodes of black comedy drama Baby Reindeer, which premiered on Netflix to critical acclaim. The series went on to win six Primetime Emmys and two Golden Globes. Later that year, she portrayed English abbess Elizabeth Zouche in four episodes of BBC historical drama series Wolf Hall: The Mirror and the Light, based on the novel by Hilary Mantel.

In 2025, Root appeared in the penultimate episode of long-running ITV crime drama Vera as Deena Corbridge. She then featured in British crime thriller Lazarus for Amazon Prime; filming for the series began in February 2024 and it was released in October 2025.. That year also saw Root return to the stage for the first time in seven years, playing the Duchess of York opposite Jonathan Bailey in Richard II at the Bridge Theatre, directed by Nicholas Hytner.

In July 2026, it was announced that Root had been cast as English novelist George Eliot in the Royal Shakespeare Company's upcoming adaptation of Middlemarch. The production will premiere at the Swan Theatre in Stratford-upon-Avon and is due to run from October 2026 to January 2027.

== Philanthropy ==
In 2010, after hearing a talk by American attorney and former International Justice Mission president Gary Haugen, Root founded Talitha Arts, a non-profit organisation that uses the creative arts to provide therapeutic support for survivors of trafficking and domestic abuse throughout the UK and overseas. The organisation gained charitable status in 2015, and has since expanded to support children, refugees, ex-offenders, and people experiencing homelessness as well as those living with dementia. In 2016, Root was awarded a Point of Light Award by Prime Minister Theresa May in recognition of her work. She was also shortlisted for Lorraine Kelly's Inspirational Woman of the Year Award; she was informed of her nomination in a surprise live announcement on the Lorraine programme. In 2020, Root announced that she was stepping down as Artistic Director after ten years in the role.

== Theatre ==
Her stage credits include:

- Essie in The Devil's Disciple (Bernard Shaw), Leeds Playhouse, 1983
- Juliet in Romeo and Juliet and Hermia in A Midsummer Night's Dream, RSC small-scale tour 1983; The Other Place 1984
- Jessica in The Merchant of Venice, RSC Royal Shakespeare Theatre, 1984
- Moth in Love's Labours Lost, RSC Royal Shakespeare Theatre, 1984
- Lucy Ellison in Today by Robert Holman, RSC The Other Place, October 1984; The Pit Barbican Centre, May 1985
- Apricot in The Dragon's Tail by Douglas Watkinson, Apollo Theatre, October 1985
- Neuroza in Tell Me Honestly (Kenneth Branagh), Not the RSC Festival, Almeida Theatre 1985
- Adela in The House of Bernarda Alba (Federico García Lorca, directed by Núria Espert), Lyric Hammersmith, September 1986; Globe Theatre, January 1987
- Harriet in The Man of Mode (George Etherege), RSC Swan Theatre, July 1988; The Pit, April 1989
- Lady Macbeth in Macbeth, RSC Barbican Theatre, May 1989
- Betty McNeil in Some Americans Abroad (Richard Nelson), RSC The Pit, July 1989
- Cordelia in King Lear, RSC Almeida Theatre. September 1989
- Cressida in Troilus and Cressida, RSC Swan Theatre, April 1990; The Pit, June 1991
- Rosaline in Love's Labours Lost RSC Royal Shakespeare Theatre, September 1990; Barbican Theatre, March 1991
- Nina in The Seagull (Anton Chekhov), RSC Swan Theatre; November 1990; Barbican Theatre July 1991
- Cleopatra in Caesar and Cleopatra (Shaw), co-starring with Alec McCowen, Greenwich Theatre, February 1992
- Nora in The Plough and the Stars (Sean O'Casey), West Yorkshire Playhouse, April 1993
- The Manageress in 50 Revolutions (Murray Gold), Oxford Stage Company, Whitehall Theatre, September 1999
- Edith in Conversations After a Burial (Yasmina Reza), Almeida Theatre, September 2000
- Polina Bardin in Enemies (Maxim Gorky in a version by David Hare), Almeida Theatre, May 2006
- Sarah in The Norman Conquests, an interlinked trilogy by Alan Ayckbourn, Old Vic, October 2008
- Corinne in The Country, Arcola Theatre (Martin Crimp), September 2010
- Hester Collyer in The Deep Blue Sea (Terence Rattigan), Chichester Festival Theatre, July 2011
- Bea in Jumpy (Nina Raine), Duke of York's Theatre, August 2012
- Carol in The Herd (Rory Kinnear), Bush Theatre, September 2013
- Zhenya in Donkey Heart (Moses Raine), Trafalgar Studios, January 2015
- Heather Espy in Racing Demon (David Hare), Theatre Royal Bath, June 2017
- Miss Madrigal in The Chalk Garden (Enid Bagnold), Chichester Festival Theatre, June 2018
- Alice Green / Duchess of York in Richard II, Bridge Theatre, February 2025
- George Eliot in Middlemarch, RSC Royal Shakespeare Theatre, October 2026

== Filmography ==
=== Film ===
| Year | Film | Role | Notes |
|---|---|---|---|
| 1989 | The BFG | Sophie (voice) | |
| 1996 | Jane Eyre | Miss Temple | |
| 1996 | Deep in the Heart | Kate Markham | |
| 1999 | Whatever Happened to Harold Smith? | Margaret Robinson | |
| 2004 | Bloom | Helen Chapman | Short film |
| 2004 | Girl Afraid | | Short film |
| 2011 | The Iron Lady | Amanda | |
| 2016 | Their Finest | Cecy / Mrs. Brown | |
| 2017 | The Black Prince | Queen Victoria | |
| 2020 | Summerland | Mrs. Lawrence | |
| 2023 | Allelujah | Cynthia | |

=== Television ===
| Year | Film | Role | Notes |
|---|---|---|---|
| 1985 | Storyboard | Polly Swift | Episode: "Ladies in Charge" |
| 1985 | Time for Murder | Sarah Penwarden | Episode: "This Lightning Always Strikes Twice" |
| 1986 | Worlds Beyond | Julia | Episode: "Guardian of the Past" |
| 1987 | Mary Rose | Mary Rose | Television film |
| 1988 | The South Bank Show | Claire Clairmont | Episode: "Birth of Frankenstein and Dracula" |
| 1988 | Jackanory | Herself - Storyteller | 5 episodes |
| 1991 | The House of Bernarda Alba | Adela | Television film |
| 1993 | Casualty | Joyce Paice | Episode: "Wild Card" |
| 1993 | The Man Who Cried | Hilda Maxwell | Television film |
| 1993 | The Buddha of Suburbia | First TV Producer | Miniseries; 2 episodes |
| 1994 | Love on a Branch Line | Miss Mounsey | Miniseries; 4 episodes |
| 1994 | Shakespeare: The Animated Tales | Kate | Episode: "The Taming of the Shrew" |
| 1994 | Hildegard of Bingen | Ricardis | Television documentary film |
| 1995 | Persuasion | Anne Elliot | Television film |
| 1996 | Breaking the Code | Patricia 'Pat' Green | Television film |
| 1997 | Harry Enfield & Chums | Miss Hetherington | Episode #2.6 |
| 1997 | Turning World | Evelyn Sharples | 3 episodes |
| 1997 | Original Sin | Frances Peverell | Miniseries; 3 episodes |
| 1997 | Sunnyside Farm | Dawn | Episode: "A Rare Visitor" |
| 1997 | Dangerfield | Alice Stratton | Episode: "Guilt" |
| 1998 | Mortimer's Law | Rachel Mortimer | 6 episodes |
| 1998 | Big Cat | Alice | Television film |
| 2000 | Anna Karenina | Dolly | Miniseries; 4 episodes |
| 2001 | Holby City | Abbie Sawyer | Episode: "Snakes and Ladders" |
| 2001 | A Small Summer Party | Karen | Television film |
| 2002 | Waking the Dead | Lorna Gyles | 2 episodes: "Special Relationship: Parts 1 & 2" |
| 2002 | Daniel Deronda | Mrs. Davilow | Miniseries; 4 episodes |
| 2002−2003 | The Forsyte Saga | Winifred Dartie née Forsyte | 2 series; 10 episodes |
| 2003 | Midsomer Murders | Ruth Scholey | Episode: "A Talent for Life" |
| 2003 | Love Again | Maeve Brennan | Television film |
| 2003 | A Touch of Frost | Dolores Delmonte | Episode: "Another Life" |
| 2003 | Little Britain | Baby's Mother | Episode: "Most People in a Mini" |
| 2003 | Foyle's War | Elizabeth Lewes | Episode: "Fifty Ships" |
| 2003 | The Adventure of English | Anne Elliott | Episode: "Speaking Proper" |
| 2004 | Peter Ackroyd's London | Charlotte Brontë | Television film |
| 2004 | Rose and Maloney | Marsha Campese | 2 episodes: "Katie Phelan: Parts 1 & 2" |
| 2004 | All About Me | Miranda | 8 episodes |
| 2005 | The Robinsons | Maggie Robinson | 6 episodes |
| 2005 | Empire | Noella | Miniseries; 3 episodes |
| 2005 | Julian Fellowes Investigates: A Most Mysterious Murder | Vera Sidney | Episode: "The Case of the Croydon Poisonings" |
| 2006 | The Afternoon Play | Andrea | Episode: "The Last Will and Testament of Billy Two-Sheds" |
| 2006 | Brief Encounters | June Makenzie | Miniseries; episode: "Lost & Found" |
| 2006 | The Impressionists | Alice Hoschedé | Miniseries; 2 episodes |
| 2006−2011 | Star Trek: New Voyages | Federation Ambassador / Extra | 4 episodes |
| 2007 | The Robber Bride | Tony Fremont | Television film |
| 2007 | Starship Farragut | Lt. Allison Bell | Episode: "The Captaincy" |
| 2007 | Miss Marie Lloyd - Queen of The Music Hall | Mrs. Chant | Television film |
| 2008 | Fiona's Story | Julie | Television film |
| 2008 | Agatha Christie's Poirot | Mrs. Rendell | Episode: "Mrs McGinty's Dead" |
| 2010 | Law & Order: UK | Patricia Smith | Episode: "Defence" |
| 2010 | Thorne: Sleepyhead | Teresa Maxwell | Television film |
| 2012 | DCI Banks | Mary Rothwell | 2 episodes: "Dry Bones That Dream: Parts 1 & 2" |
| 2013 | Casualty | Evelyn Winnell | Episode: "Punch Drunk Love" |
| 2013 | Zou | (voice) | Episode: "Zou the Chef" (English version) |
| 2013 | The Tunnel | Doctor Cross | Episode #1.8 |
| 2015 | Count Arthur Strong | Karen | Episode: "The Heist" |
| 2015 | Death in Paradise | Teresa Gower | Episode: "Damned If You Do..." |
| 2015 | New Tricks | Eleanor | Episode: "Lottery Curse" |
| 2017 | Sherlock | Emma Welsborough | Episode: "The Six Thatchers" |
| 2018 | Casualty | Barb Edmonds | Episode #32.24 |
| 2018 | The Other Side of the Coin | Wife | Television film |
| 2018 | Unforgotten | Carol Finch | 6 episodes |
| 2018 | Patrick Melrose | Virginia Watson-Scott | Miniseries; episode: "Some Hope" |
| 2019 | Silent Witness | Olivia Walsh | Episode: "Deathmaker: Part 1" |
| 2019 | MotherFatherSon | Interviewer | Episode #1.6 |
| 2020 | Call the Midwife | Florrie Watkins | Episode #9.2 |
| 2020 | The Sister | June Fox | Miniseries; 4 episodes |
| 2021 | Dalgliesh | Sister Brumfett | 2 episodes: "Shroud for a Nightingale: Parts One & Two" |
| 2022 | Casualty | Heather Croft | Episode: "Never Alone" |
| 2022 | The Capture | Margaret | Episode: "The Flip" |
| 2022 | Safe Space | (unknown) | Television pilot |
| 2023 | You & Me | Nurse Richards | Miniseries; episodes: "How We Used to Be" and "Who's Emma?" |
| 2023 | The Sixth Commandment | Sue Farquhar | Miniseries; 4 episodes |
| 2024 | Baby Reindeer | Elle Dunn | Miniseries; 3 episodes |
| 2024 | Wolf Hall: The Mirror and the Light | Abbess Zouche | Miniseries; 4 episodes |
| 2025 | Vera | Deena Corbridge | Series 14; episode 1: "Inside" |
| 2025 | Lazarus | Margot MacIntyre | TV series |

== Citations ==
- The Journal, "Dame 'Kate' Scores Double Triumph", 21 January 1993, Page 1.
