= Joan Clarke =

English cryptanalyst (1917–1996)

Joan Clarke MBE
- Clarke, c. 1940s
- Born: Joan Elisabeth Lowther Clarke; 24 June 1917; West Norwood, London, England
- Died: 4 September 1996 (aged 79); Headington, Oxfordshire, England
- Other name: Joan Clarke Murray (1952–1996)
- Education: Newnham College, Cambridge
- Occupation: Cryptanalyst
- Known for: Codebreaking at Bletchley Park in World War II; Numismatism
- Spouse: John Murray (m. 1952; died 1986)
- Partner: Alan Turing (engaged in 1941 but did not marry)
- Awards: British Numismatic Society Sanford Saltus Gold Medal (1986)

Joan Elisabeth Lowther Murray (née Clarke; 24 June 1917 – 4 September 1996) was an English cryptanalyst and numismatist who worked as a code-breaker at Bletchley Park during the Second World War. Although she did not personally seek the spotlight, her role in the Enigma project that decrypted the German secret communications earned her awards and citations, such as appointment as a Member of the Order of the British Empire (MBE), in 1946.

== Early life and education ==
Joan Elisabeth Lowther Clarke was born on 24 June 1917 in West Norwood, London, England. She was the youngest child of Dorothy Elisabeth Clarke (née Fulford) and the London clergyman Revd. William Kemp Lowther Clarke. She had three brothers and one sister.

Clarke attended Dulwich High School for Girls in south London and won a scholarship in 1936, to attend Newnham College, Cambridge. Her work in an undergraduate geometry class at Cambridge drew the attention of mathematician Gordon Welchman, who became her academic supervisor.

Clarke gained a double first degree in mathematics and was a Wrangler. She won the Philippa Fawcett prize and was awarded the Helen Gladstone scholarship for a further year of study. She was denied a full degree, as until 1948 Cambridge awarded these only to men.

== Career ==
=== Codebreaking at Bletchley Park ===
Just before the outbreak of World War II, Welchman and three other top mathematicians were recruited to the Government Code and Cypher School, which aimed to break the German Enigma Code. The Germans used the Enigma machine to encrypt their messages, which they believed to be unbreakable.

In June 1940, Welchman recruited Clarke to the agency with the offer of 'interesting work'. She arrived at Bletchley Park on 17 June 1940 and was initially placed in an all-women group, referred to as "The Girls", who mainly did routine clerical work. Clarke said she knew of only one other female cryptologist working at Bletchley Park.

Clarke ended up working at Bletchley Park in the section known as Hut 8 with Alan Turing, whom she knew slightly through her older brother Michael. She quickly became the only female practitioner of Banburismus, a cryptanalytic process developed by Alan Turing which reduced the need for bombes: electromechanical devices as used by British cryptologists Welchman and Turing to decipher German encrypted messages during World War II.

In 1941, trawlers were captured as well as their cipher equipment and codes. Before this information was obtained, wolf packs had sunk 282,000 tons of shipping a month from March to June 1941. By November, Clarke and her team were able to reduce this number to 62,000 tons. Hugh Alexander, head of Hut 8 from 1943 to 1944, described her as "one of the best Banburists in the section". Alexander himself was regarded as the best of the Banburists. He and I. J. Good considered the process more an intellectual game than a job. It was "not easy enough to be trivial, but not difficult enough to cause a nervous breakdown".

An Enigma machine of four rotors was introduced in 1942 which stymied Hut 8's decryption efforts and led to German U-boats successfully attacking Allied shipping convoys again. Clarke had access to intercepted code papers and worked out that that same cipher was used on the fourth rotor as the three-rotor system, which enabled Shaun Wylie to break the code. Over a million German naval messages were decrypted from the Enigma machines by Hut 8.

In the period before D-Day, Hut 8's work increased, as the team worked in conjunction with Hut 10. Their work involved decoding German weather signals, enabling Allied bombing raids in the time prior to the Normandy Landings. Their work also supported the Special Operations Executive operations which laid groundworks for the invasion.

Images
- photograph of Joan Clarke, 1936

Video
- Joan (née Clarke) Murray talking about her engagement to Turing, Horizon, 1992
- Meet the real Joan (née Clarke) Murray, Horizon, 1992
- The Strange Life and Death of Dr Turing, Horizon, 1992

Clarke became deputy head of Hut 8 in 1944, although she was prevented from progressing because she was female, and she was paid less than the men. A pay rise was arranged and she was promoted to Linguist even though she spoke no other language.

In order to be paid for her promotion, Clarke needed to be classed as a linguist, as Civil Service bureaucracy had no protocols in place for a senior female cryptanalyst. She would later take great pleasure in filling in forms with the line: "grade: linguist, languages: none". -BBC News

=== Relationship with Turing ===
"Naturally, that worried me a bit, because I did know that was something which was almost certainly permanent, but we carried on". – Joan Clarke

Clarke and Turing had been close friends since soon after they met, and continued to be until Turing's death in 1954. They shared many hobbies and had similar personalities. They became very good friends at Bletchley Park. Turing arranged their shifts so they could work together, and they also spent much of their free time together. In early 1941, Turing proposed marriage to Clarke, and subsequently introduced her to his family. When he privately admitted his homosexuality to her, she was reportedly unfazed by the revelation. After a holiday in Wales, Turing decided that he could not go through with the marriage, and broke up with Clarke in mid-1941. Clarke later admitted that she had suspected Turing's homosexuality for some time, and it was not much of a surprise when he made the admission to her.

== Postwar ==
Joan Clarke was awarded an MBE for her codebreaking activities in 1946. After the war, Clarke worked for Government Communications Headquarters (GCHQ). There, in 1947, she met Lieutenant-Colonel John Kenneth Ronald Murray, a retired army officer who had served in India. They were married by the Bishop of Chichester on 26 July 1952 in Chichester Cathedral, where her father was a Canon. Shortly after their marriage, John Murray retired from GCHQ due to ill health and the couple moved to Crail in Fife where they lived at Priorscroft, 14 Nethergate. In 1962, they returned to work at GCHQ, where Clarke would work until retiring in 1977 at the age of 60.

After her husband's death in 1986, Clarke moved to Headington, Oxfordshire, where she continued her research into coinage. During the 1980s, she helped Sir Harry Hinsley with the appendix to Volume 3, Part 2 of British Intelligence in the Second World War. She also helped historians studying war-time codebreaking at Bletchley Park. Due to continuing secrecy among cryptanalysts, the full extent of her accomplishments remains unknown. Recent histories of GCHQ suggest that she played a role in its work during the Falklands War: helping to track the Argentine submarine Santa Fe in April 1982.

=== Numismatic interest ===
After meeting her husband, who had published work on the Scottish coinage of the 16th and 17th centuries, Clarke developed an interest in numismatics history. She established the sequence of the complex series of gold unicorn and heavy groat coins that were in circulation in Scotland during the reigns of James III and James IV. In 1986, her research was recognised by the British Numismatic Society when she was awarded the Sanford Saltus Gold Medal. Issue No. 405 of the Numismatic Circular described her paper on the topic as "magisterial".

== Death ==
Clarke died at her home at 7 Larkfields, Headington Quarry, Oxford, England on 4 September 1996 at age 79.

== Commemoration ==
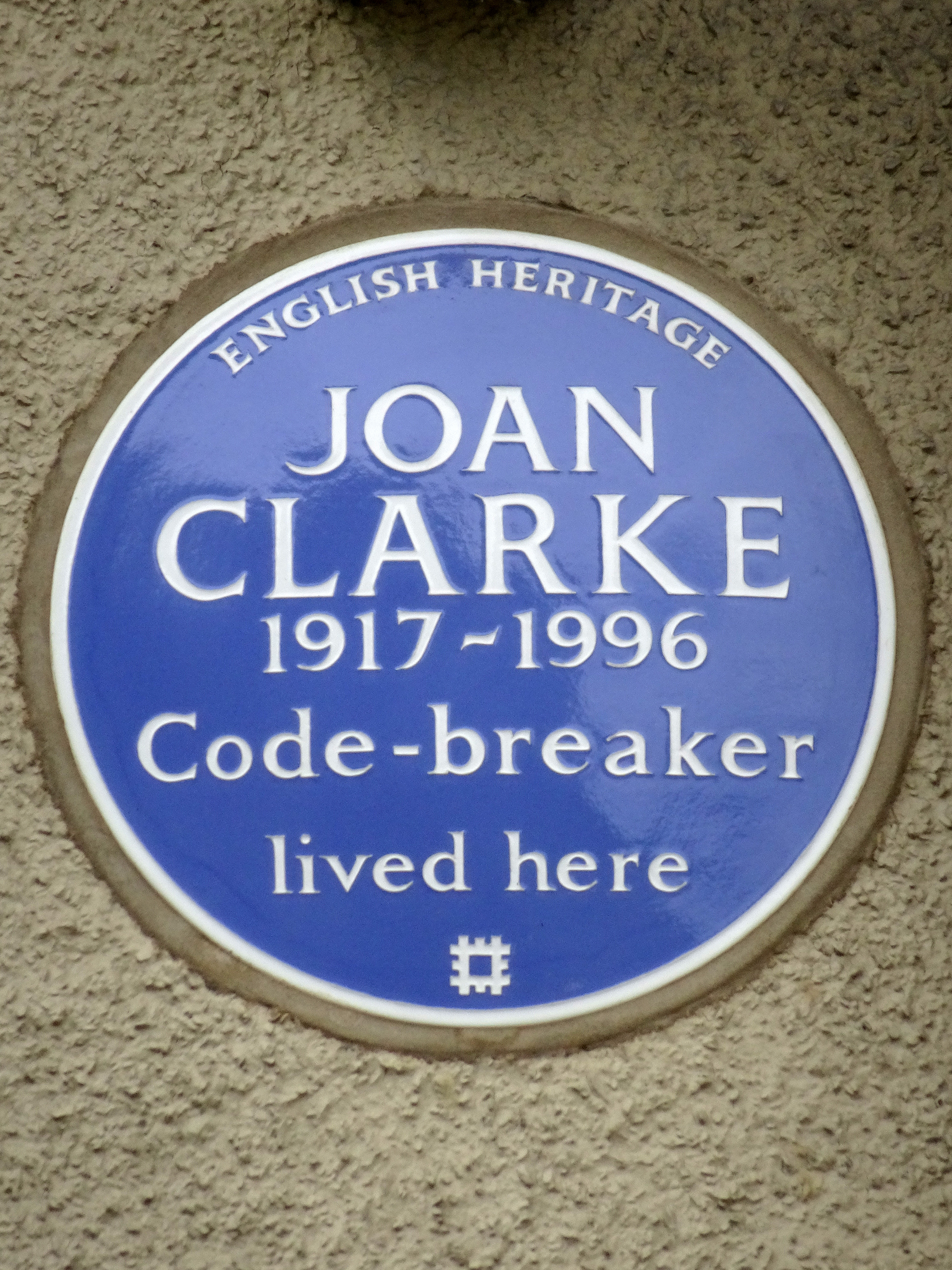
English Heritage blue plaque for Joan Clarke

An Oxfordshire Blue Plaque was unveiled on her house on 27 July 2019.

In May 2024 a blue plaque in Joan Clarke's memory was unveiled by English Heritage at 193 Rosendale Road, West Dulwich, London, SE21 8LW, her home as a child.

== Portrayal in adaptation ==
Clarke was portrayed by Keira Knightley in the film The Imitation Game (2014), opposite Benedict Cumberbatch as Alan Turing. Turing's surviving niece, Inagh Payne, described Clarke as "rather plain" and thought that Knightley was inappropriately cast as Clarke. Turing biographer Andrew Hodges also criticised the film, stating the script "built up the relationship with Joan much more than it actually was". Knightley however was nominated for the Academy Award for Best Supporting Actress at the 87th Academy Awards for her performance as Clarke.

In contrast, an article by BBC journalist Joe Miller said that Clarke's "story has been immortalised". Director Morten Tyldum said the film shows how Clarke succeeded in her field despite working in a time "when intelligence wasn't really appreciated in women".

Amanda Root plays a character based on Clarke, renamed and recharacterized as Patricia ('Pat') Green, in the 1996 film Breaking the Code.

== Works ==
- Murray, J. (2001). A Personal Contribution to the Bombe Story. United States Department of Defense
- Murray, Joan (1993), "Hut 8 and naval Enigma, Part 1", in Hinsley, F.H.; Stripp, Alan (eds.), Codebreakers: The inside story of Bletchley Park, Oxford: Oxford University Press, pp. 113–118, ISBN 978-0-19-280132-6 – via archive.org (registration required)
