= Nicholas McGaughey =

Welsh actor

- Born: Portsmouth, England

Nicholas McGaughey is a Welsh television actor and voice actor best known for playing the character of Brandon Monk in the Welsh soap Pobol y Cwm. He has appeared on a number of top British television programmes such as Casualty in 1998. He also appeared as Praetorian Officer in the 2000 Hollywood blockbuster, Gladiator, among actors such as Russell Crowe and Oliver Reed. He also appeared in Sharpe's Gold in 1995 from the TV series Sharpe starring Sean Bean.

He appeared in various TV Series including War and Peace (2016) as Self Important Major, Da Vinci’s Demons (2014) as Captain Sindona and also the same year in Musketeers "Friends and Enemies" as Innkeeper. He also appeared in Agatha Christie’s Poirot "The Labours of Hercules" in 2013 as Inspector Lementeuil. Also in 2013 he appeared in Atlantis "Twist if Fate" as Biton, Whitechapel as Derek Redman and New Tricks as Coxy.

He appeared on the Welsh television series Pobol y Cwm in the role of Brandon Monk from 2002 to 2011. His character was killed off on 23 September 2011 after suffering a heart attack in hospital following the fire in the flat above the chip shop (Y Sosban Chips.)

McGaughey is also a published writer of poetry and short fiction. His poem "Magic Hour" was performed at Holyhead, Wales, at dusk as part of the 21 December 2017 Solstice Shorts Festival and published in the 2018 anthology Dusk from Arachne Press.

== Filmography ==
Year	Title	Role	Notes
1994	Wild Justice	David Griffith	
1995	The Englishman who Went up a Hill but Came down a Mountain	Narrator	Voice
1996	The Proposition	Ellis	
1997	Twin Town	Chunky	
1997	Trial and Retribution	Terry Smith	
1999	Beautiful People	Welshman	
2000	Gladiator	Praetorian Officer	
2001	From Hell	Officer Bolt	
2004	A Way of Life	Terry Williams	
2013	Lewis	Johnny Jay	Season 7, Episode: "The Ramblin' Boy"
2016	Crow	Maws	
2016	Miss Peregrine's Home for Peculiar Children	40's Bartender	
2016	Fantastic Beasts and Where to Find Them	Australian Wizard	
