= Frances Isobel Swan =

English artist and sculptor (1875–1941)

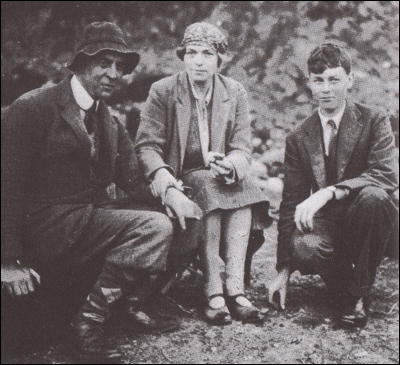
- Swan (center) with Reginald Keble (left) and her son Christopher Morcom (right), circa 1927
- Occupation: Sculptor
- Years active: 1895—1903

Frances Isobel Swan Morcom (1875–1941) was an English artist and sculptor.

She is notable for raising student athlete and astronomer Christopher Morcom, a childhood friend of English computer scientist Alan Turing. She also created a statue of her late father, Sir Joseph Swan, an inventor of the incandescent light bulb.

== Biography ==
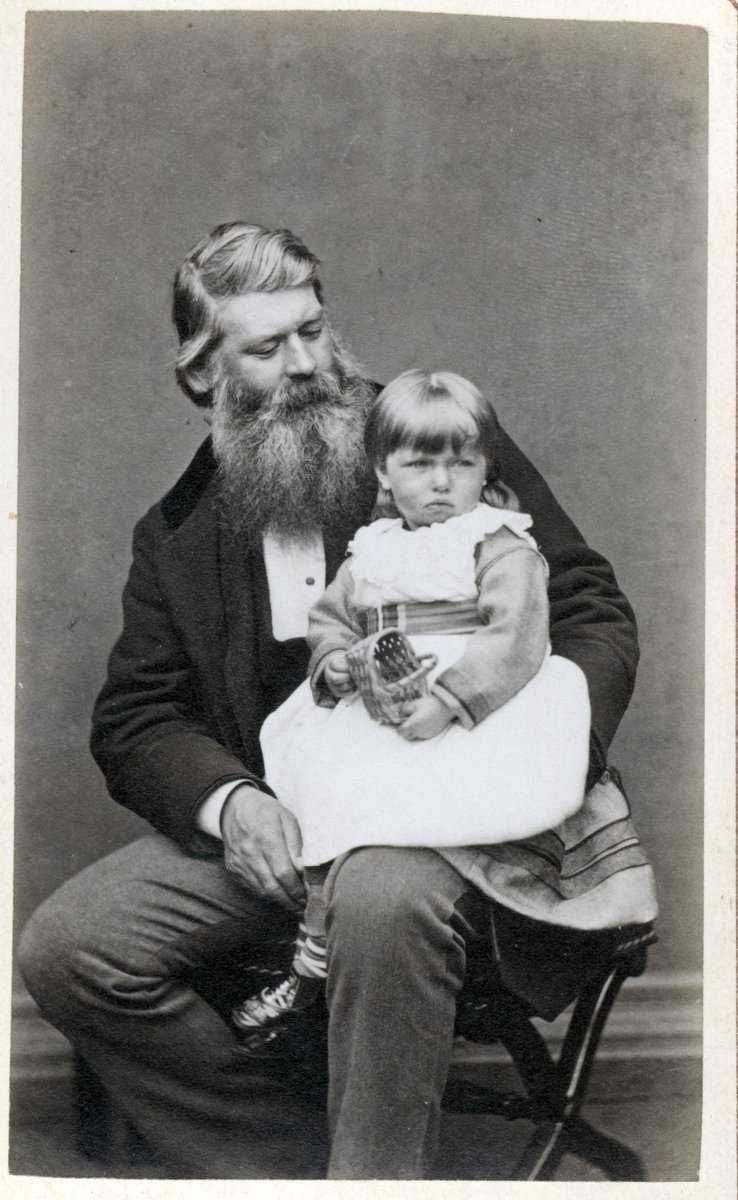
Swan in 1880 with her father, Joseph Swan

In 1875, Swan was born in Low Fell, Gateshead, Durham.

Between 1895 and 1903, she lived in 58 Holland Park, London, which was also her period of prominent exhibition.

Her statuette Marbles was exhibited in 1899 at the Corporation of Manchester Art Gallery, Seventeenth Autumn Exhibition.

In 1903, she created the bronze sculpture Adeline which was exhibited at that year's Corporation of Manchester Art Gallery, Twenty-First Autumn Exhibition.

The following year, she married Reginald Keble Swan (1877–1961).

On September 19, 1906, she gave birth to her first son, Alfred Rupert Morcom. He would become a research director and chemist for Bellis & Morcom Ltd.

On the 13 June 1911, she gave birth to Christopher Collan Morcom. A noted prankster, astronomer, and student athlete, he would become a noteworthy friend of Alan Turing before his premature death in 1930.

In 1924, she gifted a bronze statue of her late father Joseph Swan to The Literary & Philosophical Society of Newcastle in Newcastle upon Tyne.

She died on February 26, 1941, in Bromsgrove at the age of 63.

== See also ==
- List of sculptors
