= Christopher Morcom =

Childhood friend of Alan Turing (1911–1930)

- Morcom in 1927
- Born: Christopher Collan Morcom; 13 July 1911; Fockbury, Worcestershire, England
- Died: 13 February 1930 (aged 18); London, England
- Burial place: Christ Church, Catshill, England
- Education: King's Mead School, Seaford; Sherborne School
- Occupation: Student
- Known for: Relationship with Alan Turing

Christopher Collan Morcom (13 July 1911 – 13 February 1930) was an English student mathematician, scientist and astronomer. He is known for being a childhood friend of Alan Turing, the founder of modern computer science. Morcom has been described as Turing's first love, but this affection is not known to have been reciprocated. The two bonded over mathematics and science, and their relationship is depicted in the 2014 film The Imitation Game, which contains several inaccuracies.

Morcom was born in Fockbury, Worcestershire, to a wealthy family involved in the arts and sciences; his father was an engineer and his mother, Frances Isobel Morcom, was a sculptor. He was the maternal grandson of Sir Joseph Swan, an inventor of the incandescent light bulb. Morcom was educated at King's Mead School in Seaford, East Sussex, from 1922 to 1925, and at Sherborne School in Dorset from 1925 to 1929. He excelled at Sherborne and was awarded several scholarships and prizes. In December 1929 he was awarded a scholarship at Trinity College, Cambridge, but died before he could begin his studies there.

Morcom contracted bovine tuberculosis at a young age after drinking infected cows' milk. This led to his death in 1930, at the age of 18, which devastated Turing. Morcom's mother subsequently commissioned a stained-glass window in his memory, designed by the artist Karl Parsons, for Christ Church, Catshill. It depicts Saint Christopher carrying the Christ Child across a river on his shoulders; the child's face was modelled on Morcom's. The family also created the Christopher Morcom Prize for Science at Sherborne School.

== Family ==
Christopher Collan Morcom was born on 13 July 1911 at the Clock House in Fockbury, Worcestershire, England, into a wealthy family involved in the arts and sciences. His mother, Frances Isobel Morcom (née Swan), was a daughter of Sir Joseph Swan, one of the inventors of the incandescent light bulb. Frances was a sculptor and artist who studied at the Slade School of Art in London. She acquired and renovated several cottages in the nearby village of Catshill, and ran a goat farm at the family's home.

Christopher's father, Colonel Reginald Morcom, was an engineer involved in the Birmingham company Belliss and Morcom, co-founded by Christopher's paternal grandfather, Alfred Morcom. The company manufactured steam engines and air compressors. Reginald was the chairman of the company during Christopher's lifetime and in 1919 was appointed a Commander of the Most Excellent Order of the British Empire (CBE).

Christopher's older brother, Rupert, attended Sherborne School and Trinity College, Cambridge. While Christopher was at Sherborne, Rupert studied at ETH Zurich in Switzerland. Rupert was an experimentalist and had a laboratory at the family home. He had an interest in mathematics and science, which Christopher inherited.

== Education ==
Morcom attended King's Mead School in Seaford, East Sussex, from 1922 to 1925. In 1924 he successfully sat a scholarship examination to attend Sherborne School in Dorset, and he began his studies there in May 1925. He began in the upper fourth form, and lived at Lyon House, one of the school's boarding houses. In 1927 he was a year ahead and reportedly appeared unusually small for his school form. Because of a cold, he was absent from school for most of January and February 1929.

Morcom, who was mostly interested in science and mathematics, excelled at the school and was awarded several scholarships and prizes. He spent a week in December 1929 at Trinity College, Cambridge, to sit scholarship examinations, and he was awarded one, but died before he could begin his studies there.

== Personal life ==
Morcom and Rupert conducted several scientific experiments together in the family laboratory at the Clock House. Examples of projects they worked on include measuring air resistance and analysing plasticine (a type of modelling clay) for an artist. Morcom wrote to his friend Alan Turing about the plasticine project: "The procedure is to boil with organic solvents. ... I made a quite good plasticine and very nearly like the stuff we want, by mixing this iron soap with flowers of sulphur ... and adding a little mutton fat."

Morcom played the piano and was a member of Sherborne's Gramophone Society, started by their mathematics master Donald Eperson. He also played billiards, engaged in fives (an English handball sport), played rugby as a forward and enjoyed chess puzzles. In September 1922 he was the first to solve a particular chess puzzle in The Saturday Review, for which he chose a copy of Luigi Villari's 1922 military book The Macedonian Campaign as his prize. According to The Enigma, he "loved all games and was always finding out new ones (of the more trivial kind)".

Morcom had a 4-inch (10 cm) telescope and was given a star atlas for his eighteenth birthday. He conducted astronomical observations from the dormitory at Lyon House and produced a star chart. In a 1930 letter addressed to Turing, he reported viewing a comet in the constellation Delphinus. In another, he described his observations of the belts of Jupiter, a satellite exiting an eclipse, the Andromeda Nebula (now known to be a galaxy), as well as the spectra of several stars and of the Orion Nebula. He also reported that he was in the process of making a spectrograph.

Another interest of Morcom's was photography. He took several photographs of Sherborne School and its surroundings. Morcom photographed the schoolmasters Donald Eperson and Clephan Palmer during lectures without their knowledge; he showed a portrait to one of the masters, who responded that it was a "tribute rather than an impudence".

On 7 November 1927 Morcom was confirmed, which involved him confirming the promises made by his godparents on his behalf when he was baptised. The ceremony was performed by St Clair Donaldson, the Bishop of Salisbury, at the chapel of Sherborne School. His schoolmates Turing, John Noel Patch Bennett and Peter Hogg were also confirmed that day.

=== Relationship with Alan Turing ===
In 1927 Morcom met the Sherborne student Alan Turing, who was a year younger than him and who later became known as the founder of modern computer science. In 1929, after joining Morcom's form, Turing deliberately sat next to him in every class. Morcom remarked on the seating arrangement but, as Turing later wrote, "seemed to welcome me in a passive way". The two bonded over scientific topics such as Rupert's chemistry experiments, relativity, iodised salt, the orbits of planets and the age of stars. Morcom would often tease Turing.

On Wednesday afternoons, Morcom and Turing met in the school library to pursue academic topics outside of school. Together they read books by Sir James Jeans and discussed and debated several ideas about the nature of the universe. Morcom introduced Turing to astronomy, and they exchanged letters and star maps. Academically, Morcom outperformed Turing, who later wrote, "As always was my great ambition to do as well as Chris".

Morcom has been described as Turing's first love. Turing wrote about himself that he "worshipped the ground [Morcom] trod on" and that "Chris knew I think so well how I liked him, but hated me shewing it." According to the book Alan Turing: The Enigma, Turing would "never have dared" to declare his interest in Morcom.

In 1928 Turing invited Morcom to room with him at his home in Guildford, but Morcom was unable to do so, as he was about to start a three-week family holiday. In December 1929 Morcom and Turing spent a week together at Trinity College, Cambridge, to sit scholarship examinations. Morcom won the scholarship, but Turing did not; this would have led to them being separated for over a year.

=== Sense of humour ===
In 1925, at the age of 14, Morcom attempted to drop a rock down the chimney of a steam locomotive but instead hit the train driver, spurring an investigation by the railway police. In 1928 he planned an explosive balloon prank against Sherborne School for Girls. During Christmas term, he filled several balloons with a flammable gas, then constructed fuses made of wax string. After waiting for the wind to blow in the correct direction, he released them from his dormitory at Lyon House, and they travelled a quarter of a mile to the girls' school, before exploding.

While at Sherborne, Morcom's teacher H. S. Gervis incorporated "sausage-lamps" into class experiments—painted bulbs used as electrical resistors. Gervis's catchphrase, "Take another sausage-lamp, boy!" became an in-joke among Morcom and his friends Turing and Patrick Mermagen. It inspired a series of comedic sketches co-written by the three, which Morcom intended to adapt into music. He enjoyed convincing people to believe in things that were credible but not true. For example, he pranked Turing during their week at Cambridge by convincing him to advance his wristwatch by 20 minutes. Morcom also frequently joked about innocuous substances being "absolutely deadly", in one instance referencing the vanadium in his mother's steel cutlery.

== Health and death ==
Morcom contracted bovine tuberculosis at a young age after drinking infected cows' milk. Following his observation of the total solar eclipse of 29 June 1927, Morcom underwent an operation due to health issues arising from the disease. When he returned to school two terms later, in late autumn, Turing noticed that he appeared unusually thin.

On the night of 6 February 1930, during Lent term, Morcom attended a concert of part-songs given by Leonard Salisbury's Salisbury Singers, held in Sherborne's Big Schoolroom. Afterwards, Morcom became ill and was taken to the Yeatman Hospital in Sherborne for observation. The following day he was transferred to a hospital in London and underwent surgery for an intestinal obstruction, but had complications. He died in a nursing home on 13 February 1930, at the age of 18, and was buried two days later at Christ Church, Catshill. Both of his parents were later buried in the same grave.

=== Effect on Alan Turing ===
Morcom's death caused Turing great sorrow. In a letter to Morcom's mother, Turing wrote: "I know I must put as much energy if not as much interest into my work as if he were alive, because that is what he would like me to do." Turing's relationship with Morcom's mother continued for years after Morcom's death. The two exchanged letters, in which they remembered Morcom's birthdays, and on at least one occasion she sent Turing a present.

On the day of Morcom's service, Turing wrote to his own mother, "I feel sure that I shall meet Morcom again somewhere & that there will be some work for us to do together, as I believed there was for us to do here." When visiting the Morcom family's home in 1932, Turing wrote an essay titled "The Nature of Spirit" which discusses the relationship between the body and spirit. Time stated in 1999 that Morcom's death resulted in Turing's atheism and materialism.

== Legacy ==
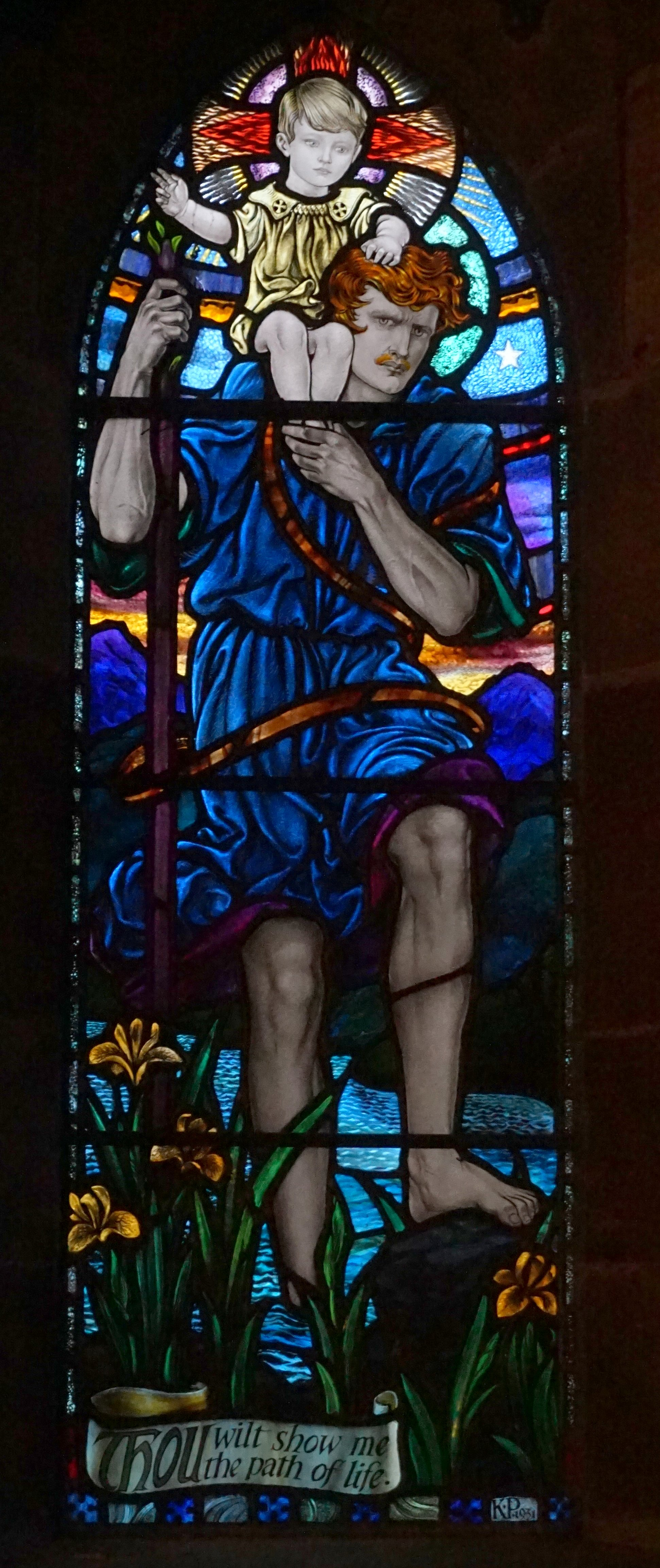
The memorial window, modelled on Morcom, at Christ Church, Catshill

Morcom's mother commissioned a window in memory of him from the stained-glass artist Karl Parsons. Installed in the parish church in Catshill, the art piece depicts Saint Christopher carrying the Christ Child across a river on his shoulders. The child's face was modelled on Morcom's.

Other dedications to Morcom are present around Sherborne School. For example, he has a memorial pew, and an inscription on an alabaster tablet at Sherborne's Lyon House reads, "In Thankful Remembrance of Christopher Collan Morcom, School Prefect and Scholar Elect of Trinity College Cambridge, Who Died 13 February 1930 After Eighteen Years of Happy Life." In memory of Morcom, his mother created an anthology, with input from Turing.

=== Christopher Morcom Prize for Science ===
In 1930 his family created the Christopher Morcom Science Prize at Sherborne. The prize included an illuminated manuscript designed by the artists Madeline Walker and Miss E. Stiles, as well as a mezzotint portrait by the illustrator Norman Hirst. In 1930 Turing became the first winner of the prize, "for showing originality in a paper on 'the reaction of sulphites and iodates in acid solution'". Turing won it again the following year for his open scholarship at King's College, Cambridge.

=== In popular culture ===
Morcom was played by Blake Ritson in the 1997 television film Breaking the Code. He is also a character in the plays Turing by George Zarkadakis and Pure by Rey Pamatmat. Geoffrey Hill's poem "A Cloud in Aquila" ends with mentions of Morcom, his relationship with Turing, and the Clock House.

In 2014 Morcom was played by Jack Bannon in The Imitation Game, a biographical film about Turing. The film's depiction of both Morcom and Turing contains several inaccuracies. It presents Turing and Morcom connecting over an interest in cyphers, but they actually bonded over mathematics and science; it was another friend with whom Turing bonded over cyphers. In the film, Turing names a computer "Christopher" after Morcom, but this was entirely fictional.

== Works cited ==
- Hodges, Andrew (2012). Alan Turing: The Enigma. Vintage. ISBN 978-0-09-911641-7.
