= Breaking the Code (film) =

- Genre: Drama
- Based on: Breaking the Code by Hugh Whitemore
- Directed by: Herbert Wise
- Starring: Derek Jacobi; Alun Armstrong; Blake Ritson; Prunella Scales; Harold Pinter
- Country of origin: United Kingdom
- Original language: English

Production
- Cinematography: Robin Vidgeon
- Editor: Laurence Méry-Clark
- Running time: 91 minutes

Original release
- Network: BBC1
- Release: 5 February 1997

Breaking the Code is a 1996 BBC television movie directed by Herbert Wise, based on the 1986 play by Hugh Whitemore about British mathematician Alan Turing, the play thematically links Turing's cryptographic activities with his attempts to grapple with his homosexuality.

== Plot ==
The story focuses on the life of the English mathematician Alan Turing, who helped decode the Enigma code, used by the Germans to send secret orders to their U-boats in World War II. He also was one of the key contributors to the development of the digital computer. Turing was also a homosexual in Britain at a time when it was illegal.

== Cast ==
- Derek Jacobi as Alan Turing
  - William Mannering as Young Alan Turing
- Alun Armstrong as Mick Ross
- Blake Ritson as Christopher Morcom
- Prunella Scales as Sara Turing
- Harold Pinter as John Smith
- Richard Johnson as Dilwyn 'Dilly' Knox
- Amanda Root as Patricia 'Pat' Green
- Julian Kerridge as Ron Miller

== Production ==
=== Background ===
The film is based on Hugh Whitemore's play of the same name, which was itself adapted from Alan Turing: The Enigma, the biography of Turing written by Andrew Hodges. Derek Jacobi had previously starred in an eight-month run of the play at the Theatre Royal, Haymarket in London's West End beginning on 21 October 1986, and stayed with the production when it transferred to Broadway in New York City, running from 15 November 1987 to 10 April 1988.

=== Broadcast ===
It was broadcast by BBC1 on 5 February 1997 in the United Kingdom, and in the United States by PBS on Masterpiece Theatre. A producer's cut was released on DVD in 2012.

== Reception ==
The film received positive critical attention and significant award recognition. It won a Broadcasting Press Guild Award and received two BAFTA nominations for Best Single Drama and Best Actor for Derek Jacobi's performance. It was also nominated for a GLAAD Media Award for its sensitive portrayal of LGBTQ+ themes. On Rotten Tomatoes, the film holds a positive critical consensus, praised for Jacobi's lead performance and the film's compassionate treatment of Turing's story. Critics noted the film is "frequently funny, always compassionate and provides real insight into the dilemmas homosexuality in a genius presents."
