= Alan Turing =

English computer scientist (1912–1954)

Alan Turing OBE FRS
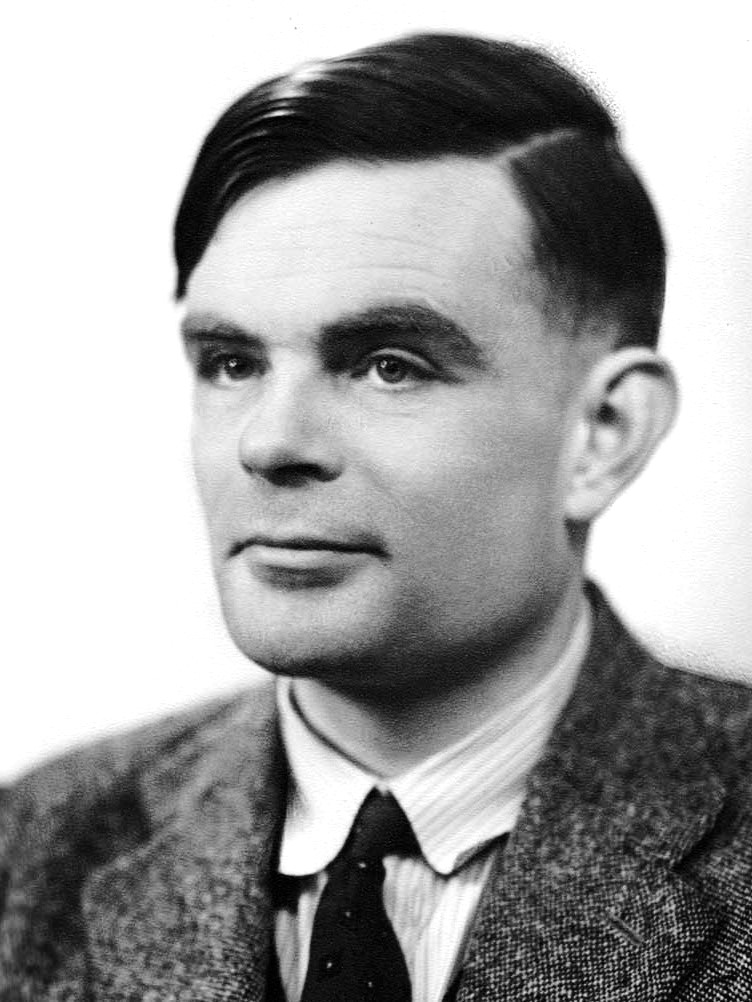
- Turing in 1951
- Born: Alan Mathison Turing; 23 June 1912; Maida Vale, London, England
- Died: 7 June 1954 (aged 41); Wilmslow, Cheshire, England
- Cause of death: Suicide by cyanide poisoning (Note: Turing's death was officially determined as a suicide by an inquest. Sometimes this verdict has been accepted or supported, and sometimes it has been questioned or disputed.)
- Education: University of Cambridge (MA); Princeton University (PhD)
- Known for: Cryptanalysis of the Enigma; Turing's proof; Turing machine; Turing test; Unorganized machine; Turing pattern; Turing reduction; "The Chemical Basis of Morphogenesis"; Turing paradox
- Partner: Joan Clarke (engaged in 1941 but did not marry)
- Awards: Smith's Prize (1936)
- Scientific career
- Fields: Logic; mathematics; cryptanalysis; computer science; mathematical and theoretical biology
- Workplaces: University of Manchester; Government Code and Cypher School; National Physical Laboratory
- Thesis: Systems of Logic Based on Ordinals (1938)
- Doctoral advisor: Alonzo Church
- Doctoral students: Robin Gandy; Beatrice Worsley

Alan Mathison Turing (/ˈtjʊərɪŋ/; 23 June 1912 – 7 June 1954) was an English mathematician and logician widely regarded as the father of theoretical computer science. He formalised the concepts of algorithm and computation with the Turing machine, a model of a general-purpose computer, and his contributions to cryptanalysis helped the Allies of World War II decipher messages encrypted by the German Enigma machine. He also contributed the Turing test to philosophy of artificial intelligence and the Turing pattern concept to mathematical and theoretical biology.

Born in London and raised in southern England, Turing graduated from King's College, Cambridge, and earned a doctorate from Princeton University in 1938. During World War II, he worked at the Government Code and Cypher School at Bletchley Park, Britain's codebreaking centre, and focused on decrypting German naval messages as the head of Hut 8. His techniques improved on the pre-war Polish bomba method and hastened cryptanalysis of the Enigma ciphering system. The resulting intelligence, known as Ultra, proved helpful in the Battle of the Atlantic. After the war, Turing joined the National Physical Laboratory, where he designed the Automatic Computing Engine, an early stored-program computer.

In 1948, he joined Max Newman's Computing Machine Laboratory at the University of Manchester, contributing to the development of early Manchester computers. He also turned to mathematical biology, working on the chemical basis of morphogenesis and theorizing chemical oscillators independently of their experimental observation. In 1952, after acknowledging a sexual relationship with another man, Turing was prosecuted for gross indecency. He received probation conditional on chemical castration and lost his security clearance. He died on 7 June 1954, aged 41, by cyanide poisoning. The inquest ruled his death a suicide.

Turing left a lasting legacy in mathematics, computing, and codebreaking. His wartime work, covered by the Official Secrets Act, went unrecognised during his lifetime. He later received numerous honors and memorials. His death was examined and interpreted by his family and biographers, who variously accepted, supported, questioned, or disputed the inquest's verdict. Following a 2009 campaign, British prime minister Gordon Brown officially apologised for the "appalling way [Turing] was treated", and Queen Elizabeth II granted Turing a pardon in 2013. The Alan Turing law refers to part of a 2017 UK law that retroactively pardoned men cautioned or convicted under the criminalisation of homosexual acts.

== Early life and education ==
=== Family ===
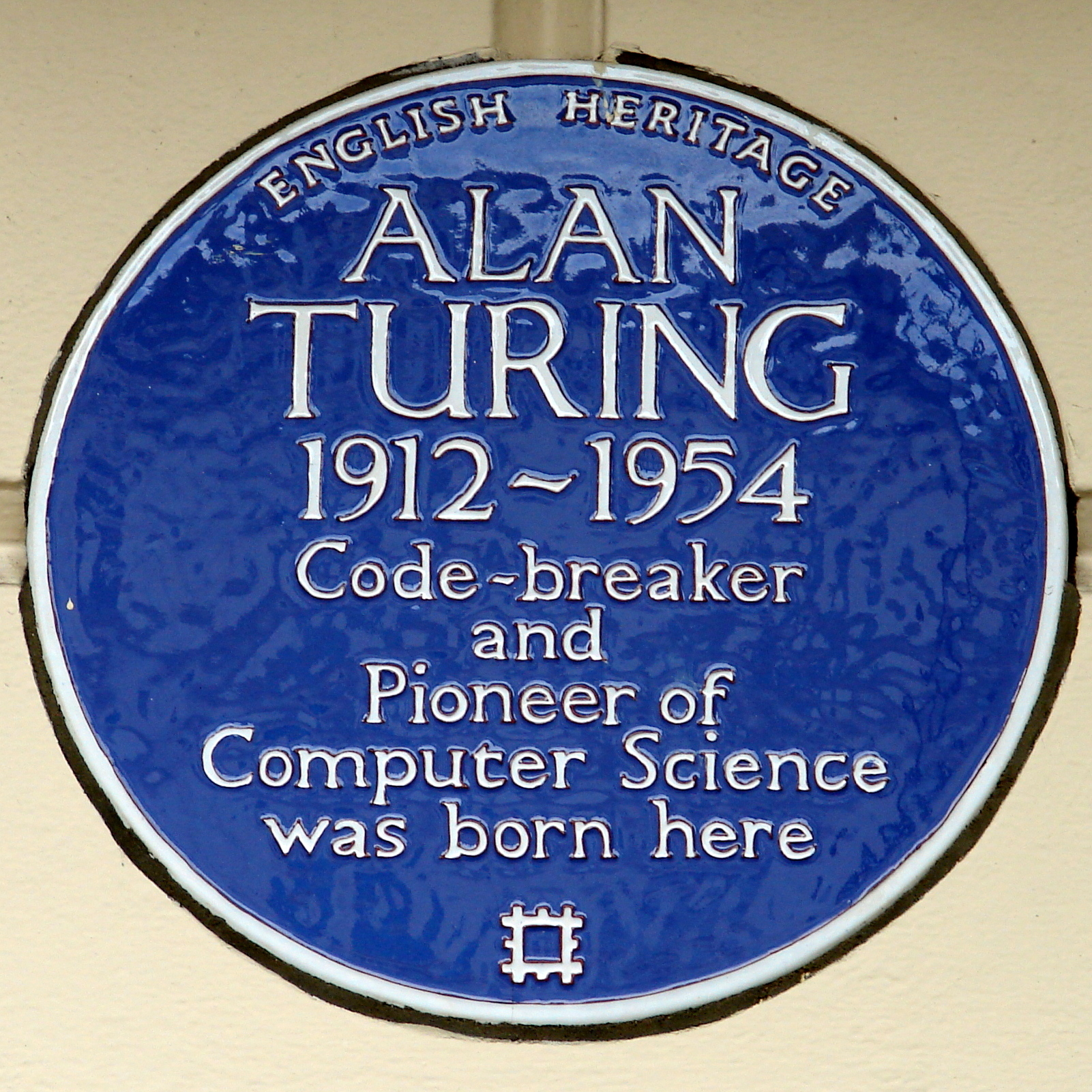
English Heritage blue plaque in Maida Vale, London, marking Turing's birthplace in 1912

Turing was born in Maida Vale, London, while his father, Julius Mathison Turing, was on leave from his position with the Indian Civil Service (ICS) of the British Raj government at Chatrapur, then in the Madras Presidency and presently in Odisha state, in India. Turing's father was the son of the clergyman Rev. John Robert Turing, from a Scottish family of merchants that had been based in the Netherlands and included a baronet. Turing's mother, Julius's wife, was Ethel Sara Turing (née Stoney), daughter of Edward Waller Stoney, chief engineer of the Madras Railways. The Stoneys were a Protestant Anglo-Irish gentry family from both County Tipperary and County Longford, while Ethel herself had spent much of her childhood in County Clare. Julius and Ethel married on 1 October 1907 at the Church of Ireland St. Bartholomew's Church on Clyde Road in Ballsbridge, Dublin.

Julius's work with the ICS brought the family to British India, where his grandfather had been a general in the Bengal Army. However, both Julius and Ethel wanted their children to be brought up in Britain, so they moved to Maida Vale, London, where Alan Turing was born on 23 June 1912, as recorded by a blue plaque on the outside of the nursing home where he was born, which later became the Colonnade Hotel. Turing had an elder brother, John Ferrier Turing, father of Dermot Turing, 12th Baronet of the Turing baronets. In 1922, he discovered Natural Wonders Every Child Should Know by Edwin Tenney Brewster. He credited it with opening his eyes to science.

Turing's father's civil service commission was still active during Turing's childhood years, and his parents travelled between Hastings in the United Kingdom and India, leaving their two sons to stay with a retired Army couple. At Hastings, Turing stayed at Baston Lodge, Upper Maze Hill, St Leonards-on-Sea, now marked with a blue plaque. The plaque was unveiled on 23 June 2012, the centenary of Turing's birth.

Very early in life, Turing's parents purchased a house in Guildford in 1927, and Turing lived there during school holidays. The location is also marked with a blue plaque.

=== School ===
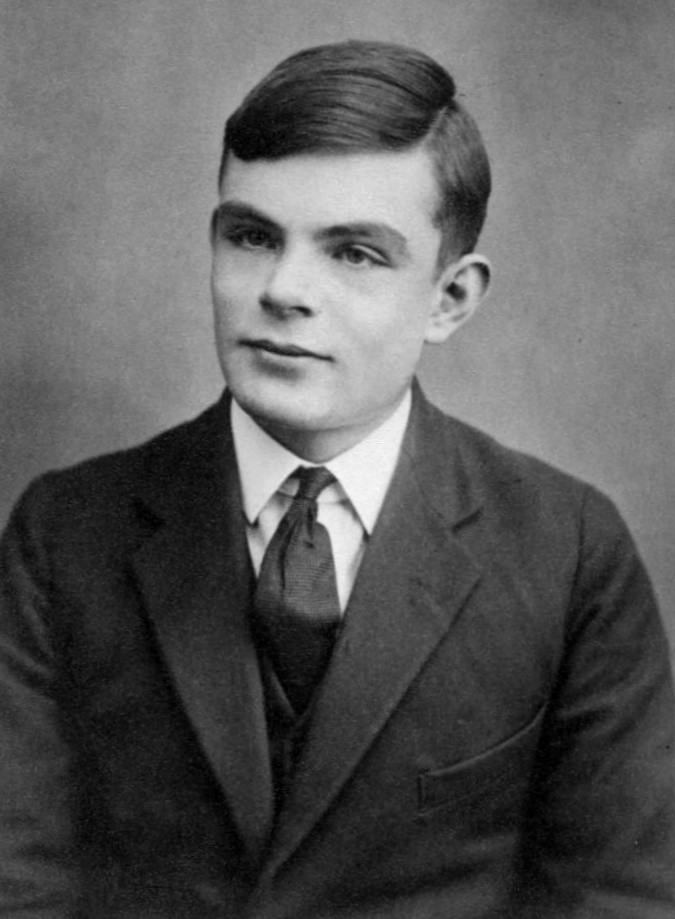
Turing at age 16, c. 1928 – c. 1929

Turing's parents enrolled him at St Michael's, a primary school at 20 Charles Road, St Leonards-on-Sea, from the age of six to nine. The headmistress recognised his talent, noting that she "...had clever boys and hardworking boys, but Alan is a genius".

Between January 1922 and 1926, Turing was educated at Hazelhurst Preparatory School, an independent school in the village of Frant in Sussex (now East Sussex). In 1926, at the age of 13, he went on to Sherborne School, an independent boarding school in the market town of Sherborne in Dorset, where he boarded at Westcott House. The first day of term coincided with the 1926 General Strike, in Britain, but Turing was so determined to attend that he rode his bicycle unaccompanied 60 miles (97 km) from Southampton to Sherborne, stopping overnight at an inn.

Turing's natural inclination towards mathematics and science did not earn him respect from some of the teachers at Sherborne, whose definition of education placed more emphasis on the classics. His headmaster wrote to his parents: "I hope he will not fall between two stools. If he is to stay at public school, he must aim at becoming educated. If he is to be solely a Scientific Specialist, he is wasting his time at a public school". Despite this, Turing continued to show remarkable ability in the studies he loved, solving advanced problems in 1927 without having studied even elementary calculus. In 1928, aged 16, Turing encountered Albert Einstein's work; not only did he grasp it, but it is possible that he managed to deduce Einstein's questioning of Newton's laws of motion from a text in which this was never made explicit.

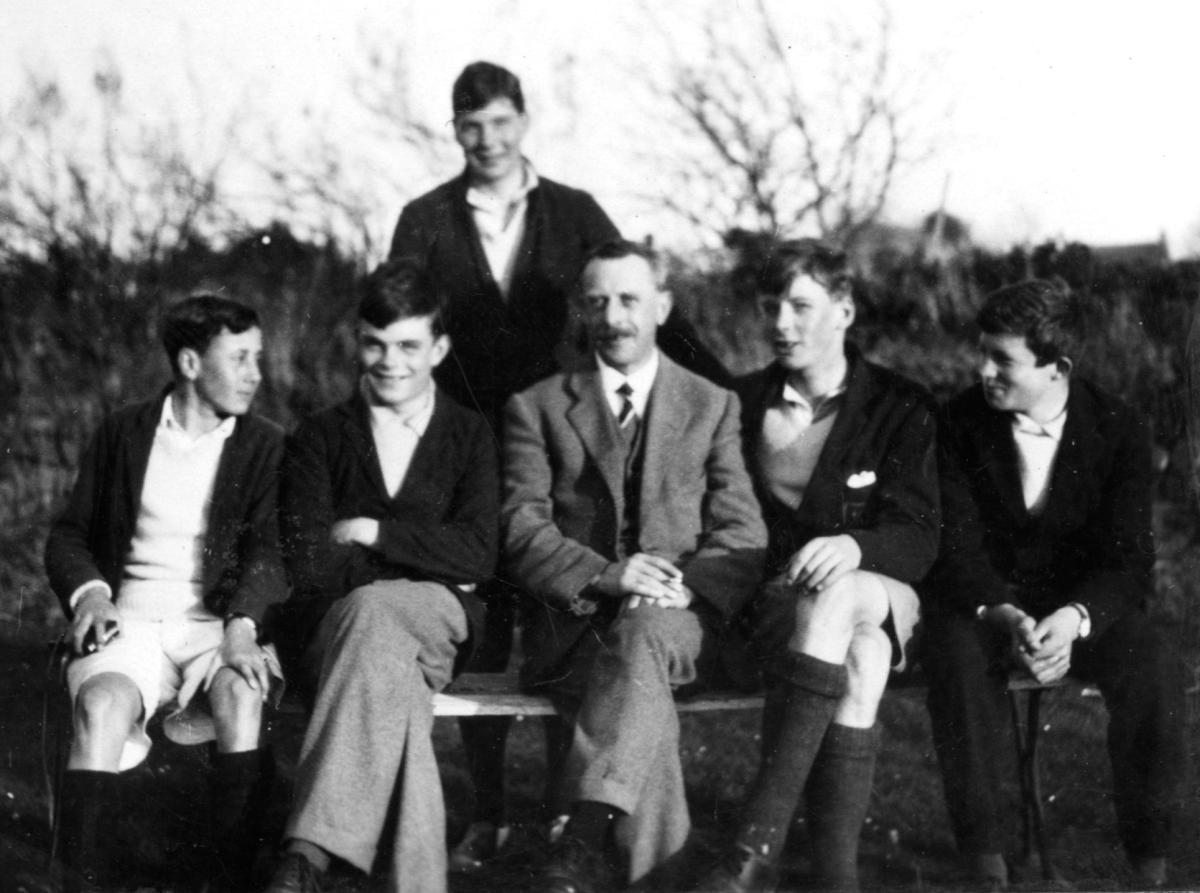
Turing (seated second from left) in Cornwall, with fellow Shirburnians: Edwin Davis, John Bennett, Peter White, Peter Hogg (seated second from right), and Duncan Carse, in April 1930.

=== Christopher Morcom ===
At Sherborne, Turing formed a significant friendship with fellow pupil Christopher Collan Morcom (13 July 1911 – 13 February 1930), who has been described as Turing's first love. Morcom was a student athlete, photographer, music collector, and astronomer, notable for his elaborate school pranks.

Their relationship, particularly in discussion of science and astronomy, is collected in letters. The Enigma details how Morcom "used to tease Alan a good deal", with various running in-jokes and pranks to inconvenience Turing. Nevertheless, their intellectual correspondences provided inspiration in Turing's future endeavours.

In February 1930, shortly before graduation, their relationship was cut short by Morcom's death. Months prior, the two had had a weeklong tour of Trinity College, Cambridge to sit scholarship examinations. Days after attending a Salisbury Singers concert, Morcom died of complications of bovine tuberculosis, which he had contracted earlier in life.

Morcom's death caused Turing great sorrow. He accepted multiple prizes on Morcom's behalf, choosing books in Morcom's memory as prizes; and Turing also won the posthumous Christopher Morcom Science Prize, organized by Morcom's mother. In a letter to Morcom's mother, Frances Isobel Morcom (née Swan), Turing wrote:

I am sure I could not have found anywhere another companion so brilliant and yet so charming and unconceited. I regarded my interest in my work, and in such things as astronomy (to which he introduced me) as something to be shared with him and I think he felt a little the same about me ... I know I must put as much energy if not as much interest into my work as if he were alive, because that is what he would like me to do.

Turing's relationship with Morcom's mother continued long after Morcom's death, with her sending gifts to Turing, and him sending letters, typically on Morcom's birthday. A day before the third anniversary of Morcom's death (13 February 1933), he wrote to Frances Morcom:

I expect you will be thinking of Chris when this reaches you. I shall too, and this letter is just to tell you that I shall be thinking of Chris and of you tomorrow. I am sure that he is as happy now as he was when he was here. Your affectionate Alan.

It has been speculated that Morcom's death was the cause of Turing's atheism and "the conviction that all phenomena must have materialistic explanations". Circa 1932, Turing wrote The Nature of Spirit while visiting Morcom's family home. His writings show a belief in such concepts as a spirit surviving death independent of the body. In a later letter, also written to Morcom's mother, Turing wrote:

Personally, I believe that spirit is really eternally connected with matter but certainly not by the same kind of body ... as regards the actual connection between spirit and body I consider that the body can hold on to a 'spirit', whilst the body is alive and awake the two are firmly connected. When the body is asleep I cannot guess what happens but when the body dies, the 'mechanism' of the body, holding the spirit is gone and the spirit finds a new body sooner or later, perhaps immediately.

=== University and work on computability ===
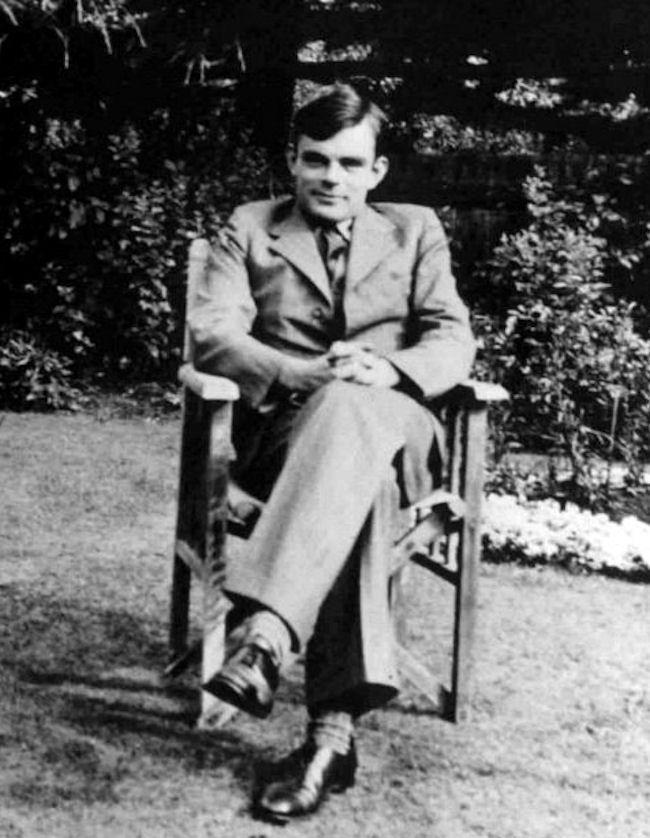
Turing in the 1930s

In 1929 Turing and his friend Christopher Morcom applied for scholarships at Trinity College, Cambridge. Morcom, who was successful, had various advantages over Turing – he was nearly a year older, and both his father and brother had studied at Trinity. However, he died three months after the offer was made. Turing, on the other hand, was unsuccessful, but sat the King's College, Cambridge Scholarship Examination in Mathematics in 1930. King's reserved most of its places for Etonians (there is a historic link with Eton as a feeder institution), making the exam very competitive for candidates from other schools. However, its examiners had a slightly different slant from those in other colleges. Hodges describes the King's examiners as looking for "a spark of originality" and notes that the papers were "notorious for their unorthodox questions".

Turing was awarded an exhibition (a lower-value scholarship) worth £80 per annum (equivalent to about £4,300 as of 2023). His undergraduate studies at Cambridge were from February 1931 to November 1934. He studied "Schedule B" of the Mathematical Tripos course. He was awarded first-class honours in mathematics. His dissertation, On the Gaussian error function, written during his senior year and delivered in November 1934, proved a version of the central limit theorem. It was finally accepted on 16 March 1935. By early that same year, Turing started his master's course (Part III)—which he completed in 1937—and, at the same time, he published his first paper, a one-page article called Equivalence of left and right almost periodicity (sent on 23 April), featured in the tenth volume of the Journal of the London Mathematical Society. Later that year, Turing was elected a Fellow of King's College on the strength of his dissertation, and served as a lecturer there. However, unknown to Turing, the version of the theorem he proved in his paper had already been proven by Jarl Waldemar Lindeberg in 1922. Despite this, the committee found Turing's methods original and so regarded the work as worthy of consideration for the fellowship. Abram Besicovitch's report for the committee went so far as to say that if Turing's work had been published before Lindeberg's, it would have been "an important event in the mathematical literature of that year".

Between early 1935 and early 1936, at the same time as Alonzo Church, Turing worked on the decidability of problems, starting from Gödel's incompleteness theorems. In mid-April 1936, Turing sent Max Newman the first draft typescript of his investigations. That same month, Church published his An Unsolvable Problem of Elementary Number Theory, with similar conclusions to Turing's then unpublished work. Finally, on 28 May of that year, he finished and delivered his 36-page paper for publication called "On Computable Numbers, with an Application to the Entscheidungsproblem". It was published in the Proceedings of the London Mathematical Society journal in two parts, the first on 30 November and the second on 23 December. In this paper, Turing proved results on the limits of computation, introducing the formal and simple hypothetical devices that became known as Turing machines. The Entscheidungsproblem (decision problem) was originally posed by German mathematician David Hilbert in 1928, and consists of seeking a computational procedure for proving or disproving theorems in the logical calculus employed by Hilbert. Turing argued that his "computing machine" would be capable of performing any conceivable mathematical computation if it were representable by finitary (i.e., in a sense, algorithmic) means. He went on to prove that there was no solution to the decision problem by first showing that some variants of the halting problem for Turing machines are undecidable: in particular, it is not possible to decide algorithmically whether a Turing machine will produce an infinite output. This paper has been called "easily the most influential math paper in history".

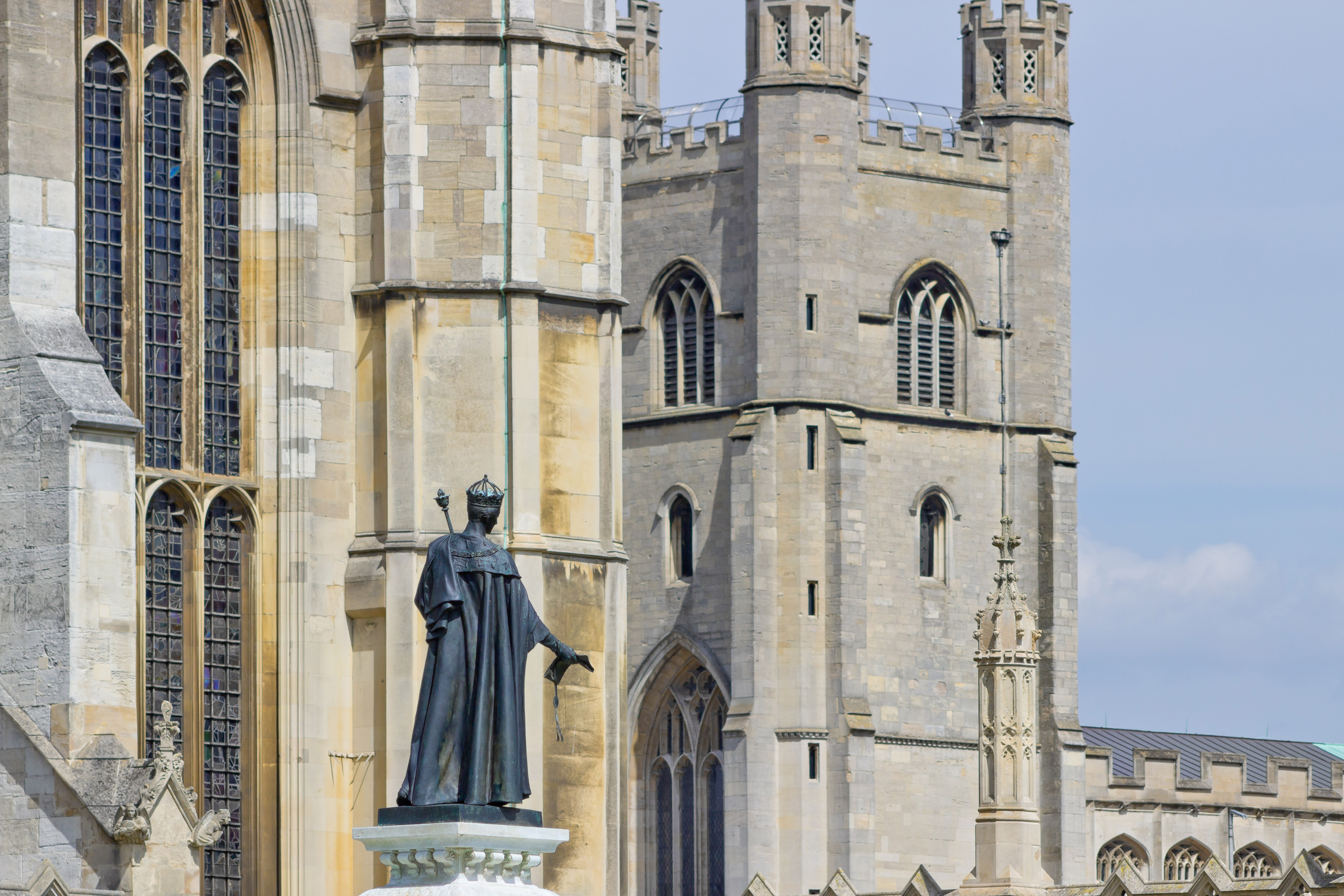
King's College, Cambridge, where Turing was an undergraduate in 1931 and became a Fellow in 1935. The computer room is named after him.

Although Turing's proof was published shortly after Church's equivalent proof using his lambda calculus, Turing's approach is considerably more accessible and intuitive than Church's. It also included a notion of a 'Universal Machine' (now known as a universal Turing machine), with the idea that such a machine could perform the tasks of any other computation machine (as indeed could Church's lambda calculus). According to the Church–Turing thesis, Turing machines and the lambda calculus are capable of computing anything that is computable. John von Neumann acknowledged that the central concept of the modern computer was due to Turing's paper. To this day, Turing machines are a central object of study in theory of computation.

From September 1936 to July 1938, Turing spent most of his time studying under Church at Princeton University, in the second year as a Jane Eliza Procter Visiting Fellow. In addition to his purely mathematical work, he studied cryptology and also built three of four stages of an electro-mechanical binary multiplier. In June 1938, he obtained his PhD from the Department of Mathematics at Princeton; his dissertation, Systems of Logic Based on Ordinals, introduced the concept of ordinal logic and the notion of relative computing, in which Turing machines are augmented with so-called oracles, allowing the study of problems that cannot be solved by Turing machines. Von Neumann wanted to hire him as his postdoctoral assistant, but he went back to the United Kingdom. His thesis was republished in the journal Proceedings of the London Mathematical Society in 1939.

== Career and research ==
When Turing returned to Cambridge, he attended lectures given in 1939 by Ludwig Wittgenstein about the foundations of mathematics. The lectures have been reconstructed verbatim, including interjections from Turing and other students, from students' notes. Turing and Wittgenstein argued and disagreed, with Turing defending formalism and Wittgenstein propounding his view that mathematics does not discover any absolute truths, but rather invents them.

=== Cryptanalysis ===
During the Second World War, Turing was a leading participant in the breaking of German ciphers at Bletchley Park. The historian and wartime codebreaker Asa Briggs has said, "You needed exceptional talent, you needed genius at Bletchley and Turing's was that genius."

From September 1938, Turing worked part-time with the Government Code and Cypher School (GC&CS), the British codebreaking organisation. He concentrated on cryptanalysis of the Enigma cipher machine used by Nazi Germany, together with Dilly Knox, a senior GC&CS codebreaker. Soon after the July 1939 meeting near Warsaw at which the Polish Cipher Bureau gave the British and French details of the wiring of Enigma machine's rotors and their method of decrypting Enigma machine's messages, Turing and Knox developed a broader solution. The Polish method relied on an insecure indicator procedure that the Germans were likely to change, which they in fact did in May 1940. Turing's approach was more general, using crib-based decryption for which he produced the functional specification of the bombe (an improvement on the Polish Bomba).

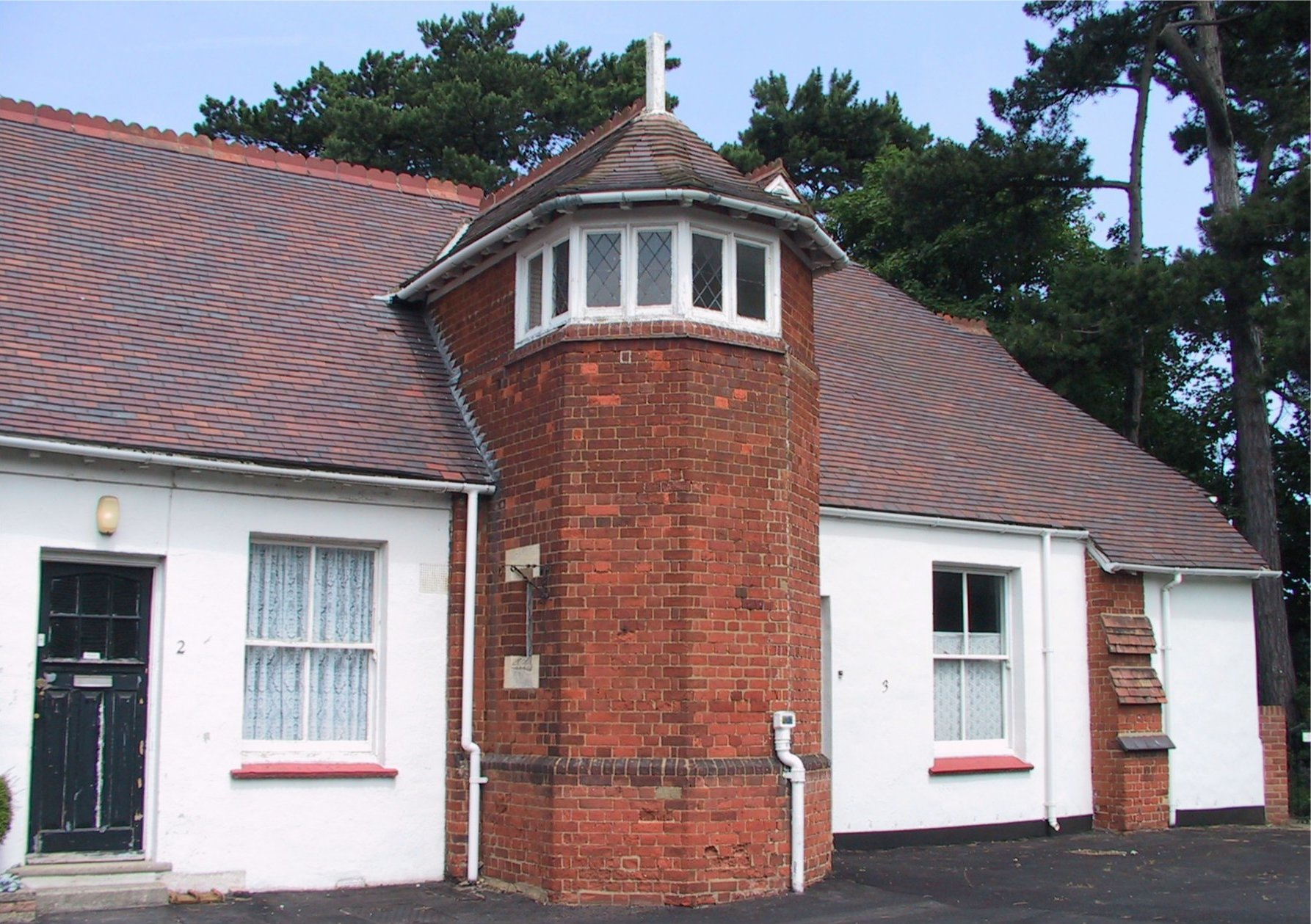
Two cottages in the stable yard at Bletchley Park. Turing worked here in 1939 and 1940, before moving to Hut 8.

On 4 September 1939, the day after the UK declared war on Germany, Turing reported to Bletchley Park, the wartime station of GC&CS. Like all others who came to Bletchley, he was required to sign the Official Secrets Act, in which he agreed not to disclose anything about his work at Bletchley, with severe legal penalties for violating the Act.

Specifying the bombe was the first of five major cryptanalytical advances that Turing made during the war. The others were: deducing the indicator procedure used by the German navy; developing a statistical procedure dubbed Banburismus for making much more efficient use of the bombes; developing a procedure dubbed Turingery for working out the cam settings of the wheels of the Lorenz SZ 40/42 (Tunny) cipher machine and, towards the end of the war, the development of a portable secure voice scrambler at Hanslope Park that was codenamed Delilah.

By using statistical techniques to optimise the trial of different possibilities in the code breaking process, Turing made an innovative contribution to the subject. He wrote two papers discussing mathematical approaches, titled The Applications of Probability to Cryptography and Paper on Statistics of Repetitions, which were of such value to GC&CS and its successor GCHQ that they were not released to the UK National Archives until April 2012, shortly before the centenary of his birth. A GCHQ mathematician, "who identified himself only as Richard," said at the time that the fact that the contents had been restricted under the Official Secrets Act for some 70 years demonstrated their importance, and their relevance to post-war cryptanalysis:

[He] said the fact that the contents had been restricted "shows what a tremendous importance it has in the foundations of our subject". ... The papers detailed using "mathematical analysis to try and determine which are the more likely settings so that they can be tried as quickly as possible". ... Richard said that GCHQ had now "squeezed the juice" out of the two papers and was "happy for them to be released into the public domain".

Turing had a reputation for eccentricity at Bletchley Park. He was known to his colleagues as "Prof" and his treatise on Enigma was known as the "Prof's Book". According to historian Ronald Lewin, Jack Good, a cryptanalyst who worked with Turing, said of his colleague:

In the first week of June each year he would get a bad attack of hay fever, and he would cycle to the office wearing a service gas mask to keep the pollen off. His bicycle had a fault: the chain would come off at regular intervals. Instead of having it mended he would count the number of times the pedals went round and would get off the bicycle in time to adjust the chain by hand. Another of his eccentricities is that he chained his mug to the radiator pipes to prevent it being stolen.

Peter Hilton recounted his experience working with Turing in Hut 8 in his "Reminiscences of Bletchley Park" from A Century of Mathematics in America:

It is a rare experience to meet an authentic genius. Those of us privileged to inhabit the world of scholarship are familiar with the intellectual stimulation furnished by talented colleagues. We can admire the ideas they share with us and are usually able to understand their source; we may even often believe that we ourselves could have created such concepts and originated such thoughts. However, the experience of sharing the intellectual life of a genius is entirely different; one realizes that one is in the presence of an intelligence, a sensibility of such profundity and originality that one is filled with wonder and excitement. Alan Turing was such a genius, and those, like myself, who had the astonishing and unexpected opportunity, created by the strange exigencies of the Second World War, to be able to count Turing as colleague and friend will never forget that experience, nor can we ever lose its immense benefit to us.

While working at Bletchley, Turing, who was a talented long-distance runner, occasionally ran the 40 miles (64 km) to London when he was needed for meetings, and he was capable of world-class marathon standards. Turing tried out for the 1948 British Olympic team, but he was hampered by an injury. His tryout time for the marathon was only 11 minutes slower than British silver medallist Thomas Richards' Olympic race time of 2 hours 35 minutes. He was Walton Athletic Club's best runner, a fact discovered when he passed the group while running alone. When asked why he ran so hard in training he replied:

I have such a stressful job that the only way I can get it out of my mind is by running hard; it's the only way I can get some release.

Due to the challenges in answering questions concerning what an outcome would have been if a historical event did or did not occur (the realm of counterfactual history), it is hard to estimate the precise effect Ultra intelligence had on the war. However, official war historian Harry Hinsley estimated that this work shortened the war in Europe by more than two years. He added the caveat that this did not account for the use of the atomic bomb and other eventualities.

At the end of the war, a memo was sent to all those who had worked at Bletchley Park, reminding them that the code of silence dictated by the Official Secrets Act did not end with the war but would continue indefinitely. Thus, even though Turing was appointed an Officer of the Order of the British Empire (OBE) in 1946 by King George VI for his wartime services, his work remained secret for many years.

=== Bombe ===
Within weeks of arriving at Bletchley Park, Turing had specified an electromechanical machine called the bombe, which could break Enigma more effectively than the Polish bomba kryptologiczna, from which its name was derived. The bombe, with an enhancement suggested by mathematician Gordon Welchman, became one of the primary tools, and the major automated one, used to attack Enigma-enciphered messages.

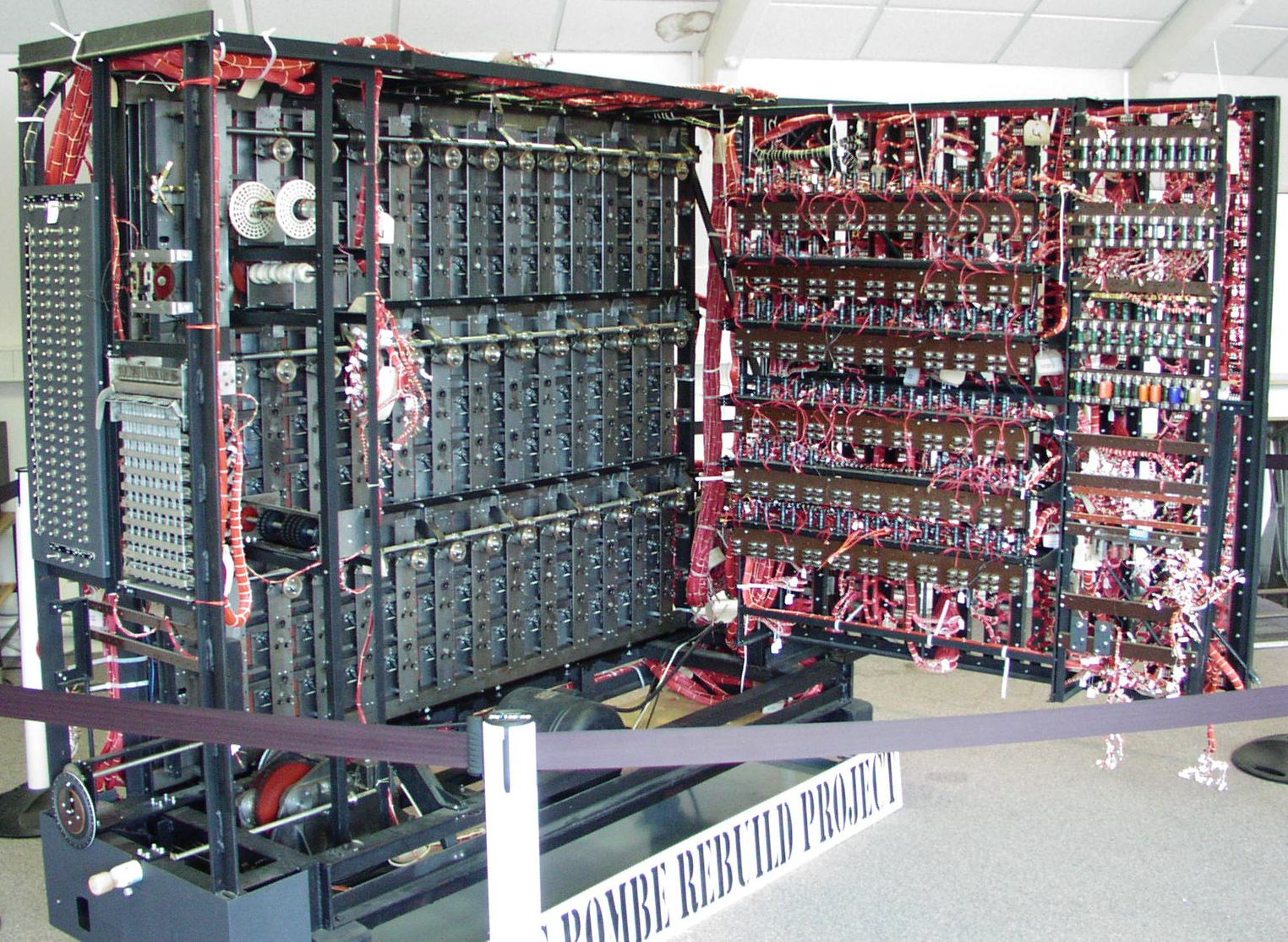
A working replica of a bombe now at The National Museum of Computing on Bletchley Park

The bombe searched for possible correct settings used for an Enigma message (i.e., rotor order, rotor settings and plugboard settings) using a suitable crib: a fragment of probable plaintext. For each possible setting of the rotors (which had on the order of 10^{19} states, or 10^{22} states for the four-rotor U-boat variant), the bombe performed a chain of logical deductions based on the crib, implemented electromechanically.

The bombe detected when a contradiction had occurred and ruled out that setting, moving on to the next. Most of the possible settings would cause contradictions and be discarded, leaving only a few to be investigated in detail. A contradiction would occur when an enciphered letter would be turned back into the same plaintext letter, which was impossible with the Enigma. The first bombe was installed on 18 March 1940.

==== Action This Day ====
By late 1941, Turing and his fellow cryptanalysts Welchman, Hugh Alexander and Stuart Milner-Barry were frustrated. Building on the work of the Poles, they had set up a good working system for decrypting Enigma signals, but their limited staff and bombes meant they could not translate all the signals. In the summer, they had considerable success, and shipping losses had fallen to under 100,000 tons a month; however, they badly needed more resources to keep abreast of German adjustments. They had tried to get more people and fund more bombes through the proper channels, but had failed.

On 28 October they wrote directly to Winston Churchill explaining their difficulties, with Turing as the first named. They emphasised how small their need was compared with the vast expenditure of men and money by the forces and compared with the level of assistance they could offer to the forces. As Andrew Hodges, biographer of Turing, later wrote, "This letter had an electric effect." Churchill wrote a memo to General Ismay, which read: "ACTION THIS DAY. Make sure they have all they want on extreme priority and report to me that this has been done." On 18 November, the chief of the secret service reported that every possible measure was being taken. The cryptographers at Bletchley Park did not know of the Prime Minister's response, but as Milner-Barry recalled, "All that we did notice was that almost from that day the rough ways began miraculously to be made smooth." More than two hundred bombes were in operation by the end of the war.

=== Hut 8 and the naval Enigma ===
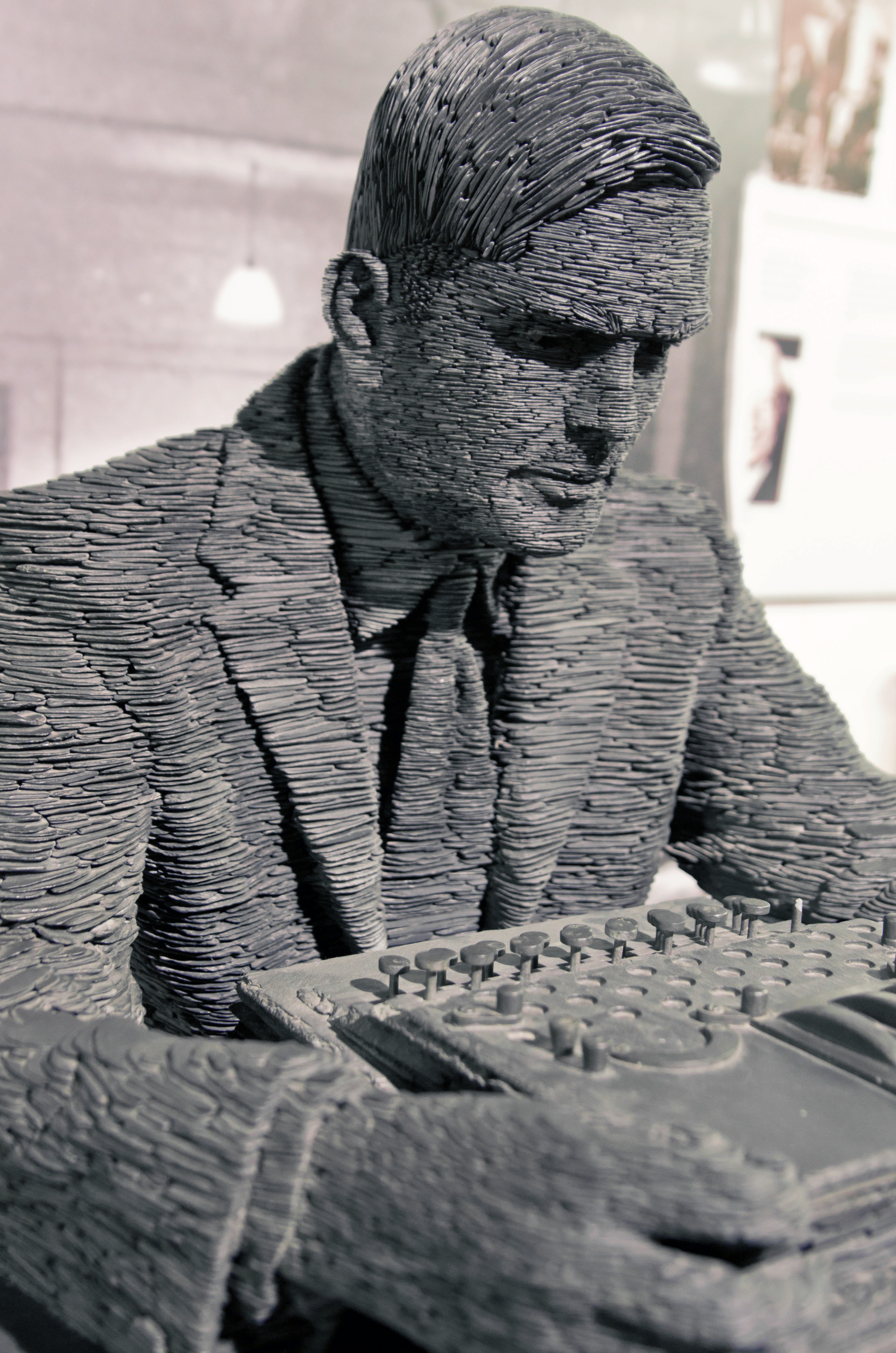
Statue of Turing holding an Enigma machine by Stephen Kettle at Bletchley Park, commissioned by Sidney Frank, built from half a million pieces of Welsh slate

Turing decided to tackle the particularly difficult problem of cracking the German naval use of Enigma "because no one else was doing anything about it and I could have it to myself". In December 1939, Turing solved the essential part of the naval indicator system, which was more complex than the indicator systems used by the other services.

That same night, he also conceived of the idea of Banburismus, a sequential statistical technique (what Abraham Wald later called sequential analysis) to assist in breaking the naval Enigma, "though I was not sure that it would work in practice, and was not, in fact, sure until some days had actually broken". For this, he invented a measure of weight of evidence that he called the ban. Banburismus could rule out certain sequences of the Enigma rotors, substantially reducing the time needed to test settings on the bombes. Later this sequential process of accumulating sufficient weight of evidence using decibans (one tenth of a ban) was used in cryptanalysis of the Lorenz cipher.

Turing travelled to the United States in November 1942 and worked with US Navy cryptanalysts on the naval Enigma and bombe construction in Washington. He also visited their Computing Machine Laboratory in Dayton, Ohio.

Turing's reaction to the American bombe design was far from enthusiastic:

The American Bombe programme was to produce 336 Bombes, one for each wheel order. I used to smile inwardly at the conception of Bombe hut routine implied by this programme, but thought that no particular purpose would be served by pointing out that we would not really use them in that way. Their test (of commutators) can hardly be considered conclusive as they were not testing for the bounce with electronic stop finding devices. Nobody seems to be told about rods or offiziers or banburismus unless they are really going to do something about it.

During this trip, he also assisted at Bell Labs with the development of secure speech devices. He returned to Bletchley Park in March 1943. During his absence, Hugh Alexander had officially assumed the position of head of Hut 8, although Alexander had been de facto head for some time (Turing having little interest in the day-to-day running of the section). Turing became a general consultant for cryptanalysis at Bletchley Park.

Alexander wrote of Turing's contribution:

There should be no question in anyone's mind that Turing's work was the biggest factor in Hut 8's success. In the early days, he was the only cryptographer who thought the problem worth tackling and not only was he primarily responsible for the main theoretical work within the Hut, but he also shared with Welchman and Keen the chief credit for the invention of the bombe. It is always difficult to say that anyone is 'absolutely indispensable', but if anyone was indispensable to Hut 8, it was Turing. The pioneer's work always tends to be forgotten when experience and routine later make everything seem easy and many of us in Hut 8 felt that the magnitude of Turing's contribution was never fully realised by the outside world.

=== Turingery ===
In July 1942, Turing devised a technique termed Turingery (or jokingly Turingismus) for use against the Lorenz cipher messages produced by the Germans' new Geheimschreiber (secret writer) machine. This was a teleprinter rotor cipher attachment codenamed Tunny at Bletchley Park. Turingery was a method of wheel-breaking, i.e., a procedure for working out the cam settings of Tunny's wheels. He also introduced the Tunny team to Tommy Flowers who, under the guidance of Max Newman, went on to build the Colossus computer, the world's first programmable digital electronic computer, which replaced a simpler prior machine (the Heath Robinson), and whose superior speed allowed the statistical decryption techniques to be applied usefully to the messages. Some have mistakenly said that Turing was a key figure in the design of the Colossus computer. Turingery and the statistical approach of Banburismus undoubtedly fed into the thinking about cryptanalysis of the Lorenz cipher, but he was not directly involved in the Colossus development.

=== Delilah ===
Following his work at Bell Labs in the US, Turing pursued the idea of electronic enciphering of speech in the telephone system. In the latter part of the war, he moved to work for the Secret Service's Radio Security Service (later HMGCC) at Hanslope Park. At the park, he further developed his knowledge of electronics with the assistance of REME officer Donald Bayley. Together they undertook the design and construction of a portable secure voice communications machine codenamed Delilah. The machine was intended for different applications, but it lacked the capability for use with long-distance radio transmissions. In any case, Delilah was completed too late to be used during the war. Though the system worked fully, with Turing demonstrating it to officials by encrypting and decrypting a recording of a Winston Churchill speech, Delilah was not adopted for use. Turing also consulted with Bell Labs on the development of SIGSALY, a secure voice system that was used in the later years of the war.

=== Early computers and the Turing test ===
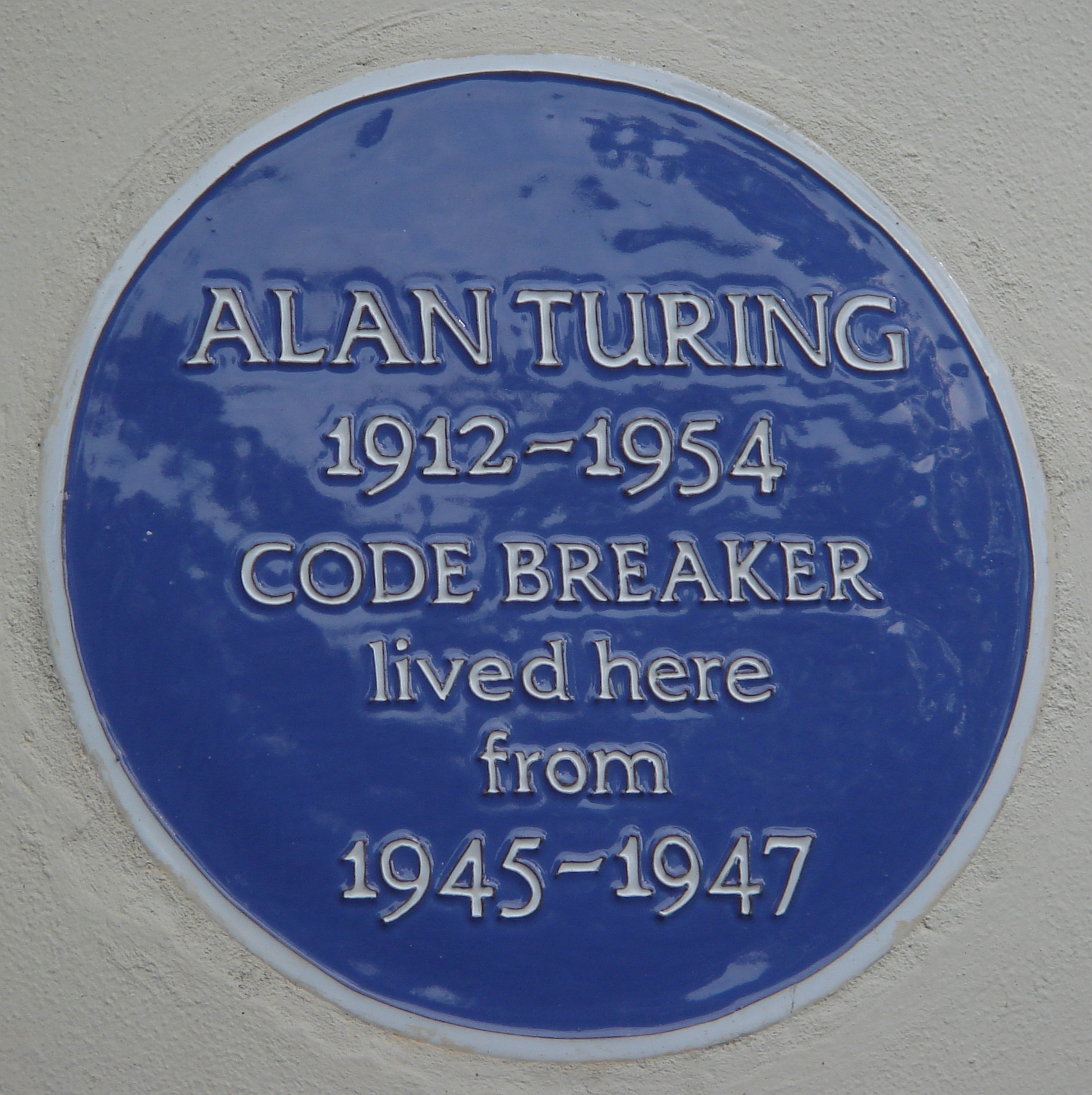
Plaque, 78 High Street, Hampton

Between 1945 and 1947, Turing lived in Hampton, London, while he worked on the design of the ACE (Automatic Computing Engine) at the National Physical Laboratory (NPL). He presented a paper on 19 February 1946, which was the first detailed design of a stored-program computer. Von Neumann's incomplete First Draft of a Report on the EDVAC had predated Turing's paper, but it was much less detailed and, according to John R. Womersley, Superintendent of the NPL Mathematics Division, it "contains a number of ideas which are Dr. Turing's own".

Although ACE was a feasible design, the effect of the Official Secrets Act surrounding the wartime work at Bletchley Park made it impossible for Turing to explain the basis of his analysis of how a computer installation involving human operators would work. This led to delays in starting the project and he became disillusioned. In late 1947 he returned to Cambridge for a sabbatical year during which he produced a seminal work on Intelligent Machinery that was not published in his lifetime. While he was at Cambridge, the Pilot ACE was being built in his absence. It executed its first program on 10 May 1950, and a number of later computers around the world owe much to it, including the English Electric DEUCE and the American Bendix G-15. The full version of Turing's ACE was not built until after his death.

According to the memoirs of the German computer pioneer Heinz Billing from the Max Planck Institute for Physics, published by Genscher, Düsseldorf, there was a meeting between Turing and Konrad Zuse. It took place in Göttingen in 1947. The interrogation had the form of a colloquium. Participants were Womersley, Turing, Porter from England and a few German researchers like Zuse, Walther, and Billing (for more details see Herbert Bruderer, Konrad Zuse und die Schweiz).

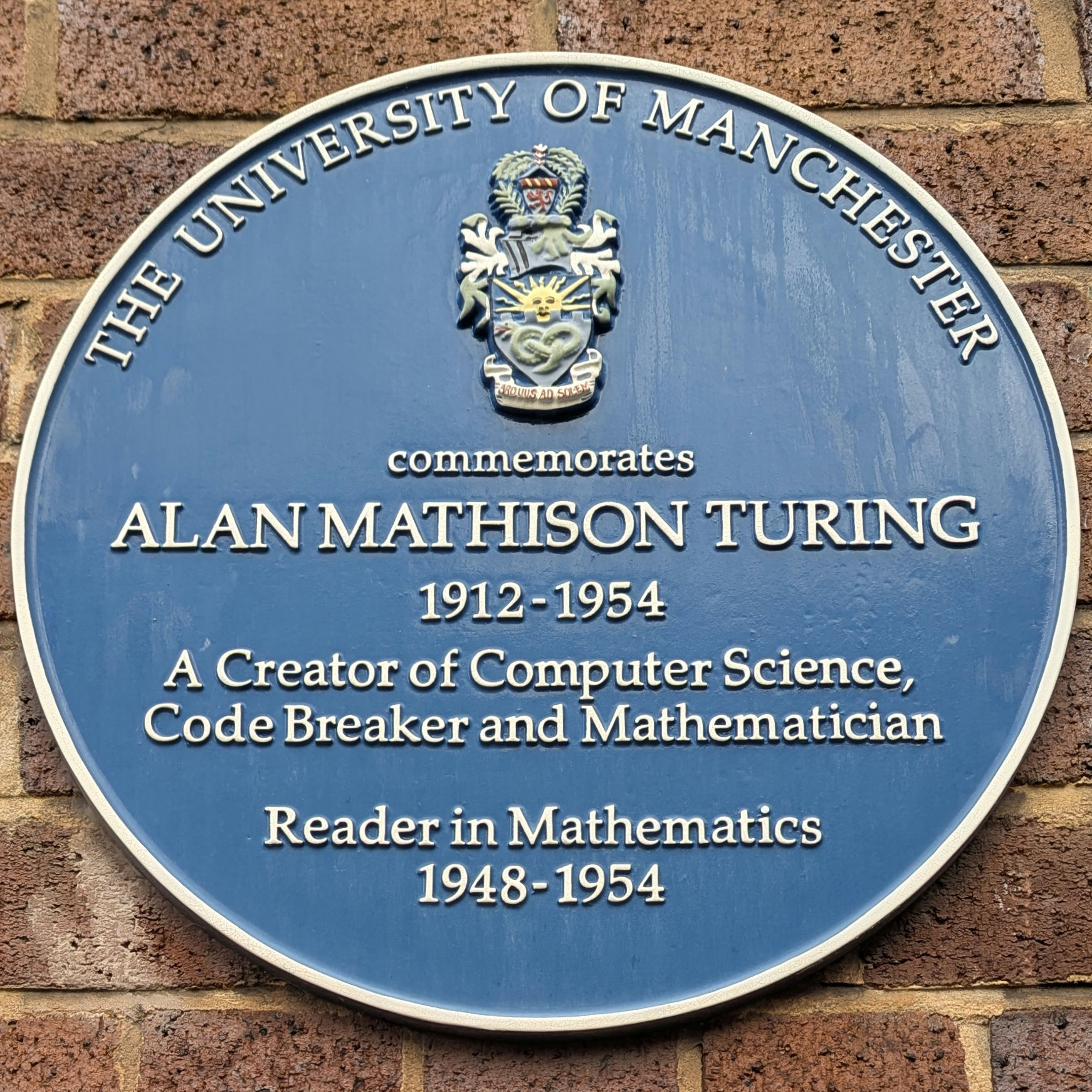
A blue plaque commemorating Alan Turing's work at the University of Manchester where he was a Reader from 1948 to 1954

In 1948, Turing was appointed reader in the Mathematics Department at the University of Manchester. He lived at "Copper Folly", 43 Adlington Road, in Wilmslow. A year later, he became deputy director of the Computing Machine Laboratory, where he worked on software for one of the earliest stored-program computers—the Manchester Mark 1. Turing wrote the first version of the Programmer's Manual for this machine, was elected to membership of the Manchester Literary and Philosophical Society, and was recruited by Ferranti as a consultant in the development of their commercialised machine, the Ferranti Mark 1. He continued to be paid consultancy fees by Ferranti until his death. During this time, he continued to do more abstract work in mathematics. In 1950 Turing published in the philosophy journal Mind his paper "Computing Machinery and Intelligence": in this he addressed the problem of artificial intelligence, and proposed an experiment that became known as the Turing test, an attempt to define a standard for a machine to be called "intelligent". The idea was that a computer could be said to "think" if a human interrogator could not tell it apart, through conversation, from a human being. In the paper, Turing suggested that rather than building a program to simulate the adult mind, it would be better to produce a simpler one to simulate a child's mind and then to subject it to a course of education. A reversed form of the Turing test is widely used on the Internet; the CAPTCHA test is intended to determine whether the user is a human or a computer. In 1951 and early 1952, after the publication of "Computing Machinery and Intelligence", Turing made a number of BBC radio appearances (two talks and one panel-debate appearance) to promote and defend his ideas about human minds and artificial intelligence.

In 1948, Turing, working with his former undergraduate colleague, D.G. Champernowne, began writing a chess program for a computer that did not yet exist. By 1950, the program was completed and dubbed the Turochamp. In 1952, he tried to implement it on a Ferranti Mark 1, but lacking enough power, the computer was unable to execute the program. Instead, Turing "ran" the program by flipping through the pages of the algorithm and carrying out its instructions on a chessboard, taking about half an hour per move. The game was recorded. According to Garry Kasparov, Turing's program "played a recognizable game of chess". The program lost to Turing's colleague Alick Glennie, although it is said that it won a game against Champernowne's wife, Isabel.

His Turing test was a significant, characteristically provocative, and lasting contribution to the debate regarding artificial intelligence, which continues after more than half a century.

=== Pattern formation and mathematical biology ===
When Turing was 39 years old in 1951, he turned to mathematical and theoretical biology, finally publishing his masterpiece "The Chemical Basis of Morphogenesis" in January 1952. He was interested in morphogenesis, the development of patterns and shapes in biological organisms. He suggested that a system of chemicals reacting with each other and diffusing across space, termed a reaction–diffusion system, could account for "the main phenomena of morphogenesis". He used systems of partial differential equations to model catalytic chemical reactions. For example, if a catalyst A is required for a certain chemical reaction to take place, and if the reaction produced more of the catalyst A, then we say that the reaction is autocatalytic, and there is positive feedback that can be modelled by nonlinear differential equations. Turing discovered that patterns could be created if the chemical reaction not only produced catalyst A, but also produced an inhibitor B that slowed down the production of A. If A and B then diffused through the container at different rates, then you could have some regions where A dominated and some where B did. To calculate the extent of this, Turing would have needed a powerful computer, but these were not so freely available in 1951, so he had to use linear approximations to solve the equations by hand. These calculations gave the right qualitative results, and produced, for example, a uniform mixture that oddly enough had regularly spaced fixed red spots. The Russian biochemist Boris Belousov had experimentally observed a chemical oscillator, the Belousov–Zhabotinsky reaction, but could not publish amid the prejudice that it violated the second law of thermodynamics. He was unaware of Turing's paper in the Philosophical Transactions of the Royal Society.

Although published before the structure and role of DNA was understood, Turing's work on morphogenesis remains relevant today and is considered a seminal piece of work in mathematical biology. Some of this work aimed to understand plant phyllotaxy, specifically how plant primordia form in a ring around the apical meristem during plant growth and development, forming Fibonacci series. One of the early applications of Turing's paper was the work by James Murray explaining spots and stripes on the fur of cats, large and small. Further research in the area suggests that Turing's work can partially explain the growth of "feathers, hair follicles, the branching pattern of lungs, and even the left-right asymmetry that puts the heart on the left side of the chest". In 2012, Sheth, et al. found that in mice, removal of Hox genes causes an increase in the number of digits without an increase in the overall size of the limb, suggesting that Hox genes control digit formation by tuning the wavelength of a Turing-type mechanism. Later papers were not available until Collected Works of A. M. Turing was published in 1992.

A study conducted in 2023 confirmed Turing's mathematical model hypothesis. Presented by the American Physical Society, the experiment involved growing chia seeds in even layers within trays, later adjusting the available moisture. Researchers experimentally tweaked the factors which appear in the Turing equations, and, as a result, patterns resembling those seen in natural environments emerged. This is believed to be the first time that experiments with living vegetation have verified Turing's mathematical insight.

=== Ratio Club and other cybernetics contacts ===
The Ratio Club was a London dining club for researchers (mostly biologists) with interests in cybernetics (which encompassed neuroscience, artificial intelligence and computing), "undoubtedly the most intellectually powerful grouping of British scientists interested in cybernetics" according to Phil Husbands and Owen Holland. At the first meeting on 4 September 1949 it was agreed to invite Turing to join. He accepted, giving his introductory talk at the 21 April 1950 meeting. (Note: This was likely not Turing's first meeting: there was a sizeable backlog of introductory member talks after the first meeting. He likely attended some or all of the intervening six meetings from 18 October 1949.) He gave later talks based on both his "Computing Machinery and Intelligence" and "Chemical Basis of Morphogenesis" papers.

On a 1949 visit to Britain to attend a conference on psychiatry American cybernetician Warren McCulloch made a trip to Manchester to meet Turing (who may have been unimpressed).

== Personal life ==
=== Treasure ===
In the 1940s, Turing became worried about losing his savings in the event of a German invasion. To protect it, he bought two silver bars weighing 3,200 oz (99.5 kg) and worth £250 (in 2022, £8,000 adjusted for inflation, £48,000 at spot price) and buried them in a wood near Bletchley Park. Upon planning to return to dig them up, Turing found that he was unable to break his own code describing where exactly he had hidden them. This, along with the fact that the area had been renovated, meant that he never regained the silver.

=== Chess ===
Turing invented a hybrid chess sport, earlier than chess boxing, referred to as round-the-house chess, one player makes a chess move, then that player runs around the house, and the other player must make a chess move before the first player returns.

Porgy, Turing's teddy bear, wearing a 1945 Christmas outfit sewn by Turing

=== Porgy ===
For Christmas 1934, the college graduate Turing asked his mother for a teddy bear, saying he never had one as a child. He received a Chad Valley teddy bear, which he named Porgy.

In 1935, while the 22-year-old Turing supervised graduates in Cambridge's Trinity Hall, students sometimes returned to find that Turing had rigged Porgy to sit by the fireplace, in front of an open book supported by a ruler. Turing reportedly greeted them with, "Porgy is very studious this morning."

Turing also employed Porgy as an audience to practise maths lectures.

In 1945, Turing sewed an outfit for the bear as a Christmas surprise for his niece, Shuna Turing, then 5 years of age. Shuna had just been gifted a new outfit for herself, consisting of a plaid skirt with red buttons. The following morning, she arose to find Porgy wearing the same outfit (crafted by Turing). This surprised Shuna enough to exclaim, "What a Christmas!". By 2012, Shuna Turing's memories and the corresponding bear was exhibited by the Bletchley Park museum.

Circa 2010, the bear had its own Facebook page.

Turing's relationship to Porgy was lampooned in the 2015 dramatic play Lovesong of the Electric Bear, in which Porgy was a protagonist.

=== Homosexuality ===
==== Engagement ====
In 1941, Turing proposed marriage to Hut 8 colleague Joan Clarke, a fellow mathematician and cryptanalyst, but their engagement was short-lived. After admitting his homosexuality to his fiancée, who was reportedly "unfazed" by the revelation, Turing decided that he could not go through with the marriage.

==== Indecency conviction ====
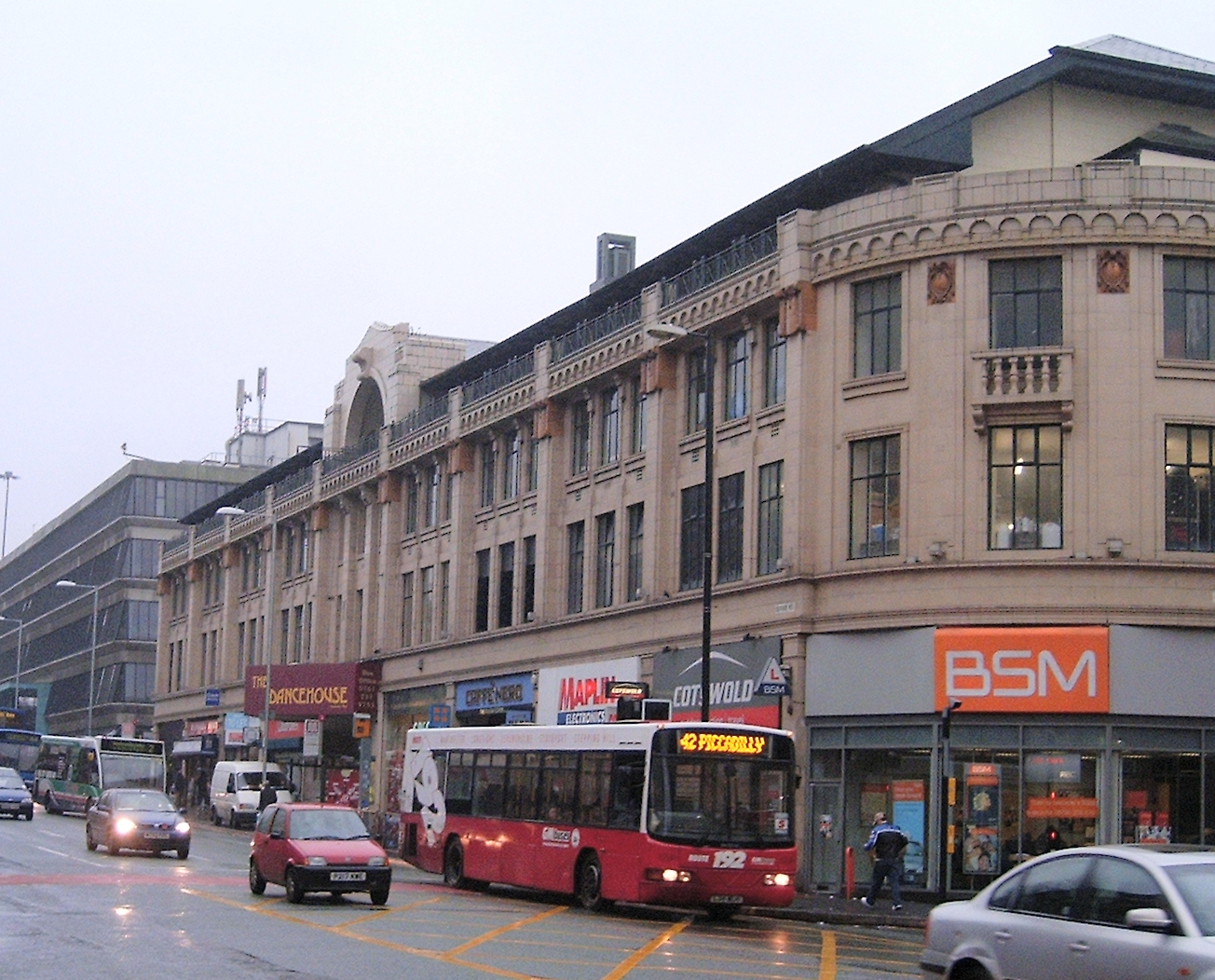
The Dancehouse Theatre, formerly the Regal Cinema, pictured in 2006, outside of which Turing met Arnold Murray

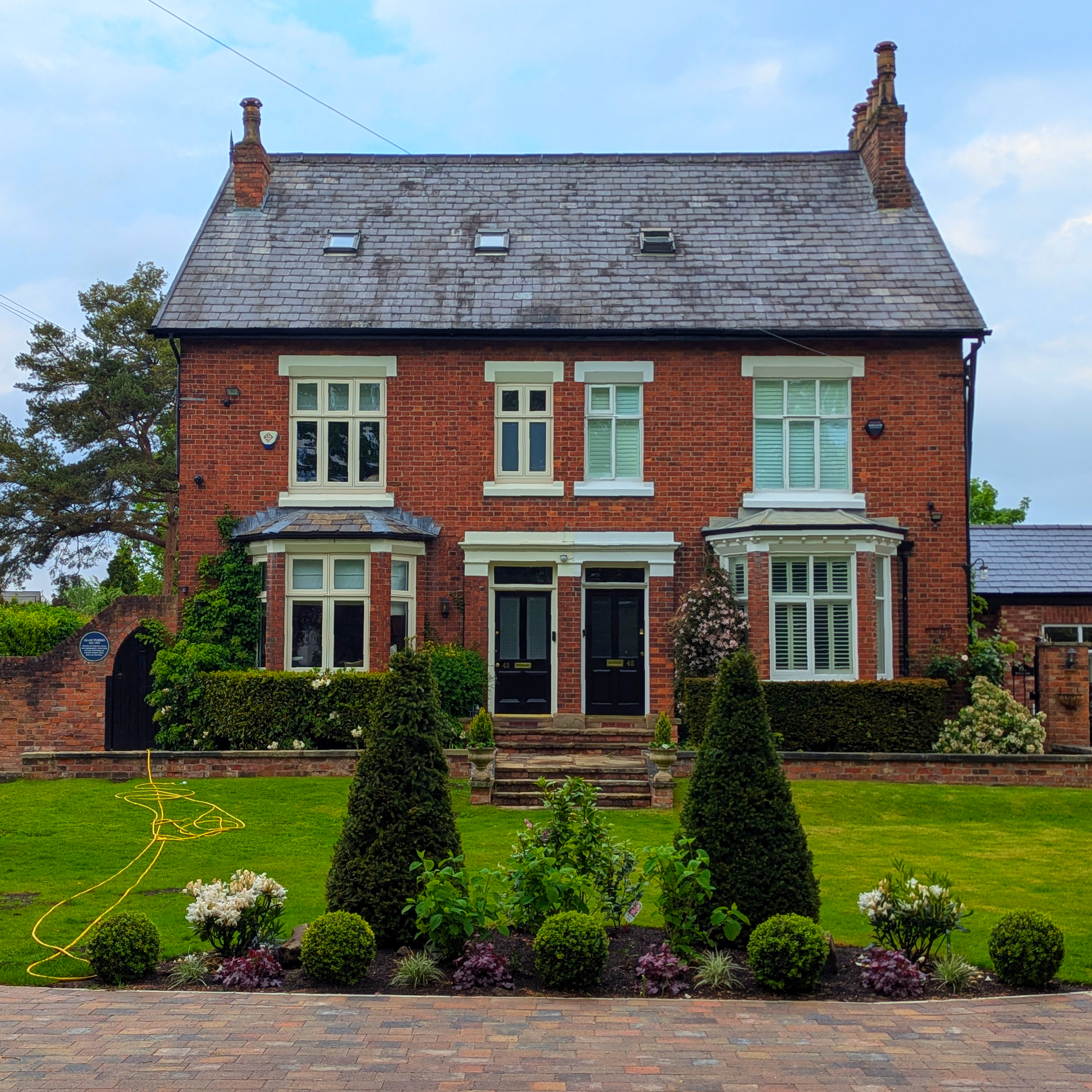
The house where Alan Turing lived in his final years from 1950 to 1954 at 43 Adlington Road in Wilmslow

In December 1951, Turing met Arnold Murray, a 19-year-old unemployed man. Turing was walking along Manchester's Oxford Road when he met Murray just outside the Regal Cinema and invited him to lunch. The two agreed to meet again and in January 1952 began an intimate relationship.

On 23 January, Turing's house in Wilmslow was burgled. Murray told Turing that he and the burglar were acquainted, and Turing reported the crime to the police. During the investigation, he acknowledged a sexual relationship with Murray. Homosexual acts were criminal offences in the United Kingdom at that time, and prosecutions had been increasing amid waning social opprobrium, a state of affairs accepted and expected in more conservative circles.

Turing's openness and refusal to recant were regarded as unusual, including by the detectives and his friends and family. He acknowledged his sexuality to his brother John, who said he had always thought of Turing as somewhat "misogynist" (insofar as he did not flirt with women). John viewed the entire situation as the outcome of Turing's sheltered, upper-class naiveté. Turing accused his brother of lacking sympathy for gay people, and John considered his brother's behaviour disgusting.

Murray and Turing were charged with "gross indecency" under Section 11 of the Criminal Law Amendment Act 1885. Initial committal proceedings for the trial were held on 27 February during which Turing's solicitor "reserved his defence", i.e., did not argue or provide evidence against the allegations. The proceedings were held at the Sessions House in Knutsford. The case, Regina v. Turing and Murray, was brought to trial on 31 March 1952. Murray was given a conditional discharge.

Turing kept his composure but confided in friends that he was nervous. Convinced by the advice of his brother and his own solicitor, he entered a plea of guilty. Turing's barrister pushed for him not to be incarcerated, and he was sentenced to 12 months' probation conditional on his agreement to undergo chemical castration via organotherapy at the Manchester Royal Infirmary. (Physical castration, as practised in parts of the US, had not reliably decreased libido and was illegal in Britain.)

In a letter signed "in distress", Turing wrote that "no doubt I shall emerge from it all a different man, but quite who I've not found out", and worried that his work would be dismissed on the basis of his homosexuality. After injections of diethylstilbestrol, a synthetic oestrogen then called stilboestrol, he developed impotence and gynaecomastia, finding the latter somewhat amusing according to his friends. The injections did not appear to work as intended, as he remained attracted to men.

Turing's conviction led to the removal of his security clearance and barred him from continuing with his cryptographic consultancy for GCHQ, the British signals intelligence agency that had evolved from GC&CS in 1946, though he kept his academic post. His trial took place only months after the defection to the Soviet Union of Guy Burgess and Donald Maclean, in summer 1951, after which the Foreign Office started to consider anyone known to be homosexual as a potential security risk.

Turing was denied US entry in 1952 and visited Norway that summer. It was more tolerant. Among the men he met there was Kjell Carlson. When Kjell tried to visit Turing, authorities intercepted Kjell's postcard detailing his travel arrangements and deported him before the two could meet. Around this time, Turing began consulting a psychiatrist, Franz Greenbaum, with whom he got on well and who subsequently became a family friend.

==== "Pryce's Buoy" ====
Circa 1953, Turing wrote an unfinished, three-page short story titled "Pryce's Buoy". It has Angus Wilson's candid, cynical, and socially aware style, much after E. M. Forster, while also revealing Turing's "playful side". Largely autobiographical, it details an erotic encounter between a male youth in need of money and a wealthy older theoretical scientist looking for casual sex. The title is a sexual pun on a fictional math equation related to the Turing test. The story was later examined by a literary scholar and covered by the press in 2026. Scene Magazine reported Turing was "cheeky, funny, and really liked sex".

== Death ==
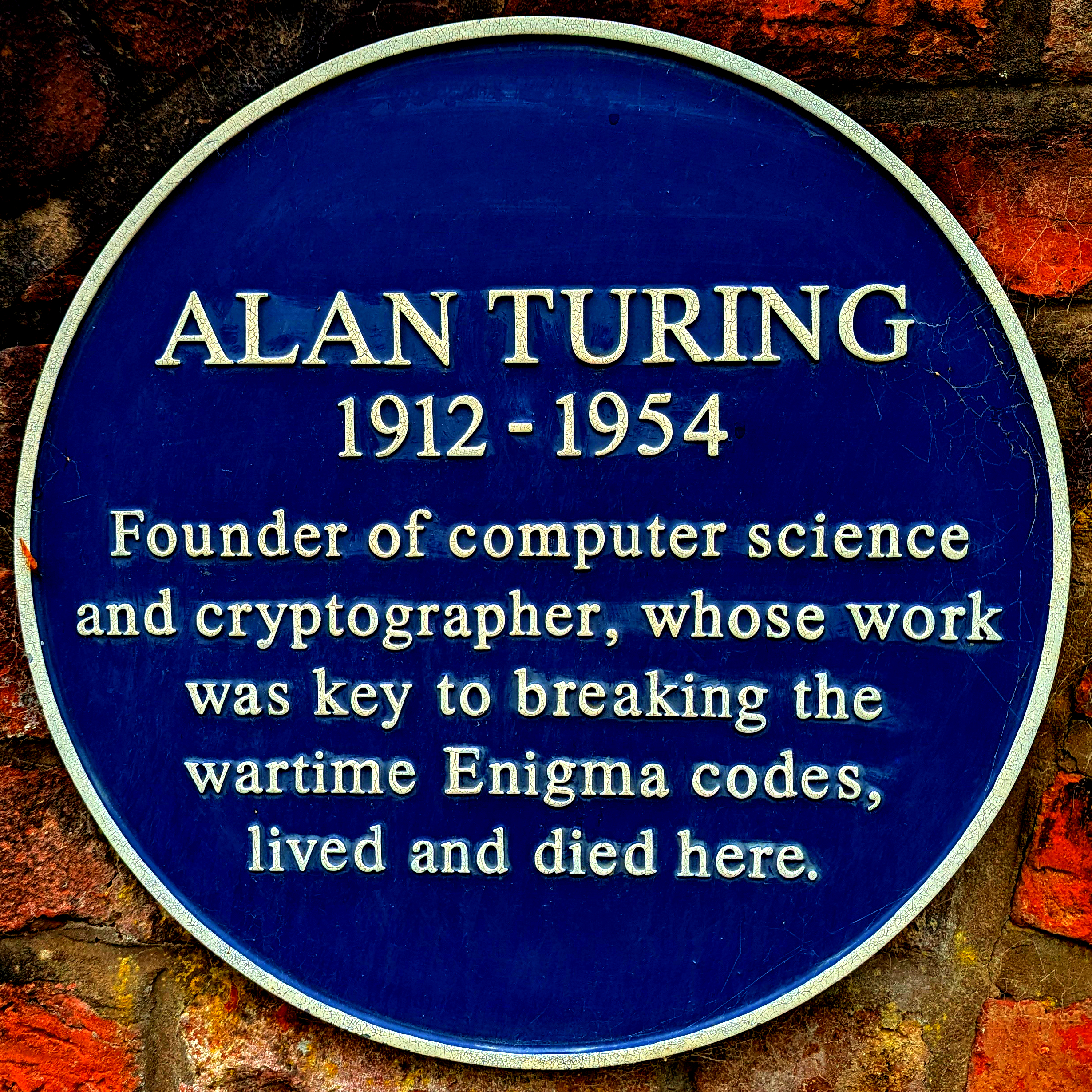
A blue plaque on the house at 43 Adlington Road, Wilmslow, where Turing lived and died

Turing outwardly maintained a generally cheerful manner. He prepared his will in February 1954, removing his brother as executor and naming P. N. Furbank, a close friend. Barbara Greenbaum, the daughter of Turing's psychiatrist, recalled an episode that May in which Turing emerged "pale, shaking, [and] horror-stricken" from a fortune teller's tent at Blackpool Pleasure Beach. She did not know what he had been told, only that he suddenly seemed "deeply unhappy" after beginning the day cheerfully. Turing had believed in fortune telling since his youth, when he had been told he would be a genius.

On 8 June, Turing's housekeeper found him dead at his home at 43 Adlington Road, Wilmslow. A post-mortem that evening determined that he had died on 7 June, aged 41, from cyanide poisoning. A half-eaten apple lay beside his bed, and there was a list of tasks to complete after the public holiday. On 9 June, the inquest returned a verdict of death by suicide. Turing's brother, John, identified the body and, on the advice of Turing's psychiatrist, accepted that an accidental death would be difficult to establish. Turing was cremated at Woking Crematorium on 12 June, attended by his mother, brother, and Lyn Newman. His ashes were scattered in the crematorium gardens, as his father's had been.

The circumstances and nature of Turing's death have been disputed and interpreted in different ways. The apple was never tested, but some biographers speculated that it had been laced with cyanide. Andrew Hodges and David Leavitt suggested that Turing may have been re-enacting a scene from the 1937 Disney film Snow White and the Seven Dwarfs, in which the Wicked Queen poisons an apple. Turing liked the scene and often ate an apple before bed, leaving it half-eaten. In his diaries, he wrote about his homosexuality and criticized his mother. His brother John kept these from her.

She returned from holiday in Italy after the inquest and never accepted the verdict, believing the poisoning had been from careless storage of laboratory chemicals. John W. Dawson Jr. called this explanation "barely plausible" while speculating about Turing's "vulnerable position in the Cold War political climate" and stressing that he was found "lying neatly" in bed, not "fighting for life" against cyanide-induced suffocation. He and philosopher Jack Copeland broached the possibility of murder, and Copeland argued that the evidence was more consistent with accidental cyanide inhalation, perhaps during an electroplating experiment. Hodges proposed that Turing may have made his death appear accidental to spare his mother, a scenario that Turing had mentioned to Furbank.

In 2020, his nephew Dermot said of Turing's last years, "The [court-ordered] treatment he received was ... the result of the rather bizarre way that homosexuality was regarded as a disease in 1950s Britain". (Note: Dermot continued, "... Alan was handed over by the court to the medics and psychiatrists".) "I reckon he took all that in his stride," Dermot added, calling it "quite hard to find any causal links between his treatment, which finished in 1953, and his death in 1954". Based on "documentary evidence", he said in 2021, he thought "there may have been some boyfriend trouble", adding that he struggled with the psychological effect of Turing's treatment as causally explanatory. He emphasised Turing's agency, (Note: Dermot said, "I am reasonably sure Alan Turing was going to leave the world on his own terms at the time of his own choosing. What decided him that that was the time to do it? I don't know.") said he did not want Turing to be "cast as a victim", and urged the removal of anti-gay laws worldwide.

== Legacy and reception ==
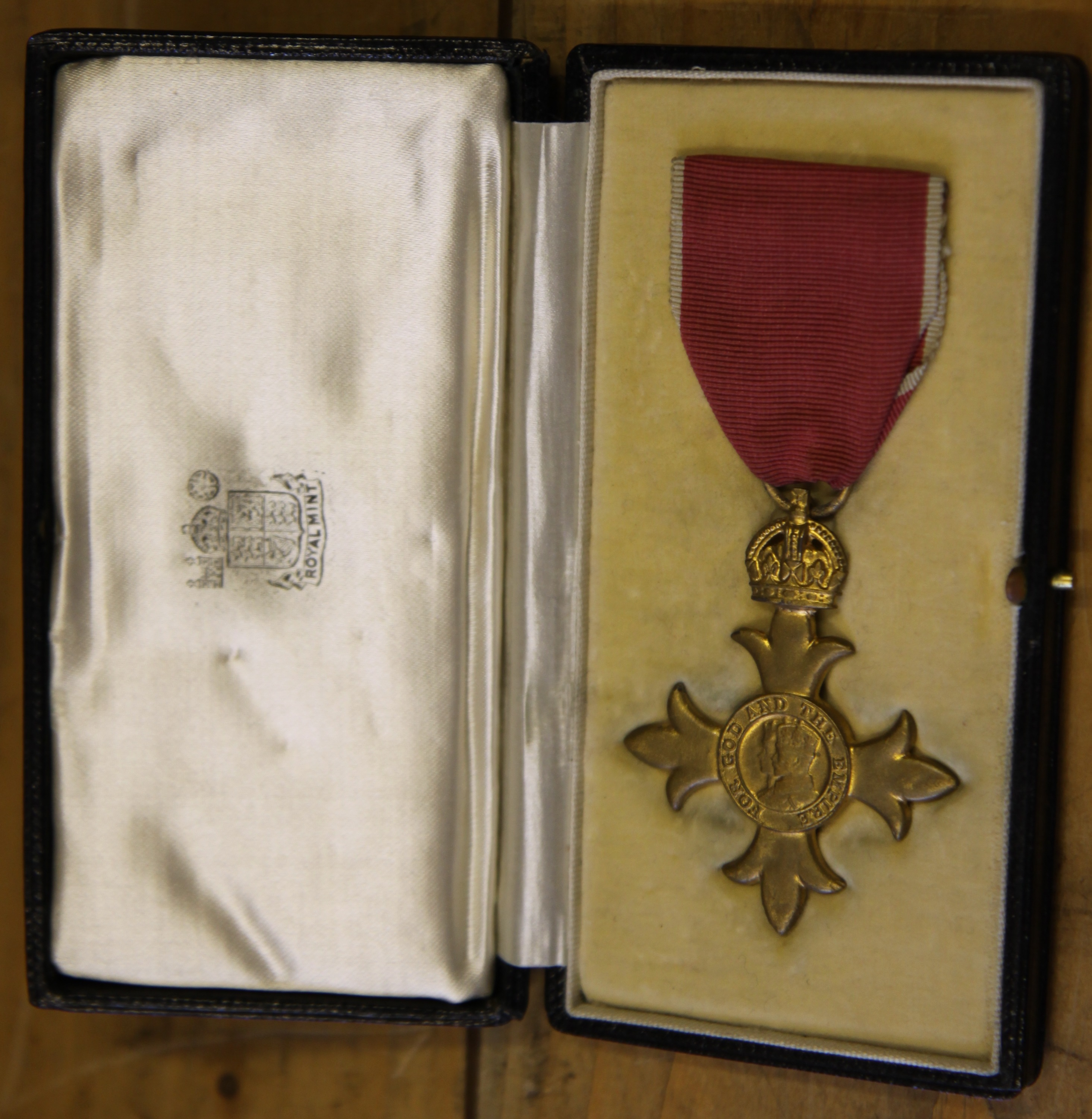
Turing's OBE currently held in Sherborne School archives

Turing left an extensive legacy in mathematics and computing which has become widely recognised with statues and many things named after him, including an annual award for computing innovation. His portrait appears on the Bank of England £50 note, first released on 23 June 2021 to coincide with his birthday. The audience vote in a 2019 BBC series named Turing the greatest scientist of the 20th century.

The cognitive scientist Douglas Hofstadter writes:

Atheist, homosexual, eccentric, marathon-running mathematician, A. M. Turing was in large part responsible not only for the concept of computers, incisive theorems about their powers, and a clear vision of the possibility of computer minds, but also for the cracking of German ciphers during the Second World War. It is fair to say we owe much to Alan Turing for the fact that we are not under Nazi rule today.

=== Government apology and pardon ===
In August 2009, British programmer John Graham-Cumming started a petition urging the British government to apologise for Turing's prosecution as a homosexual. The petition received more than 30,000 signatures. The prime minister, Gordon Brown, acknowledged the petition, releasing a statement on 10 September 2009 apologising and describing the treatment of Turing as "appalling":

Thousands of people have come together to demand justice for Alan Turing and recognition of the appalling way he was treated. While Turing was dealt with under the law of the time and we can't put the clock back, his treatment was of course utterly unfair and I am pleased to have the chance to say how deeply sorry I and we all are for what happened to him ... So on behalf of the British government, and all those who live freely thanks to Alan's work I am very proud to say: we're sorry, you deserved so much better.

In December 2011, William Jones and his member of Parliament, John Leech, created an e-petition requesting that the British government pardon Turing for his conviction of "gross indecency":

We ask the HM Government to grant a pardon to Alan Turing for the conviction of "gross indecency". In 1952, he was convicted of "gross indecency" with another man and was forced to undergo so-called "organo-therapy"—chemical castration. Two years later, he killed himself with cyanide, aged just 41. Alan Turing was driven to a terrible despair and early death by the nation he'd done so much to save. This remains a shame on the British government and British history. A pardon can go some way to healing this damage. It may act as an apology to many of the other gay men, not as well-known as Alan Turing, who were subjected to these laws.

The petition gathered over 37,000 signatures, and was submitted to Parliament by the Manchester MP John Leech but the request was discouraged by Justice Minister Lord McNally, who said:

A posthumous pardon was not considered appropriate as Alan Turing was properly convicted of what at the time was a criminal offence. He would have known that his offence was against the law and that he would be prosecuted. It is tragic that Alan Turing was convicted of an offence that now seems both cruel and absurd—particularly poignant given his outstanding contribution to the war effort. However, the law at the time required a prosecution and, as such, long-standing policy has been to accept that such convictions took place and, rather than trying to alter the historical context and to put right what cannot be put right, ensure instead that we never again return to those times.

John Leech, the MP for Manchester Withington (2005–15), submitted several bills to Parliament and led a high-profile campaign to secure the pardon. Leech made the case in the House of Commons that Turing's contribution to the war made him a national hero and that it was "ultimately just embarrassing" that the conviction still stood. Leech continued to take the bill through Parliament and campaigned for several years, gaining the public support of numerous leading scientists, including the physicist Stephen Hawking.

On 25 July 2012, a bill was introduced in the House of Lords by Lord Sharkey to grant a statutory pardon to Turing for offences under section 11 of the Criminal Law Amendment Act 1885, of which he was convicted on 31 March 1952. In December of that year, in a letter to The Daily Telegraph, Hawking and 10 other signatories including the Astronomer Royal Lord Rees, President of the Royal Society Sir Paul Nurse, Lady Trumpington (who worked for Turing during the war) and Lord Sharkey (the bill's sponsor) called on Prime Minister David Cameron to act on the pardon request. Lord Sharkey's bill did not progress past the 1st reading stage in the House of Lords during the 2012-2013 parliamentary session, and was subsequently reintroduced at the start of the next session on 9 May 2013, co-sponsored by Leech. On 19 July 2013, the day of the second reading in the Lords, the government indicated that it would support the bill. It passed its third reading in the Lords on 30 October, with its first reading in the House of Commons occurring on the same day.

At the bill's second reading in the Commons on 29 November 2013, Conservative MP Christopher Chope objected to the bill, delaying its passage. The bill was due to return to the Commons on 28 February 2014, but before the bill could be debated, the government elected to proceed instead under the royal prerogative of mercy. On 24 December 2013, Queen Elizabeth II signed a royal warrant, pardoning for Turing's conviction for "gross indecency", with immediate effect. Announcing the pardon, Lord Chancellor Chris Grayling said Turing deserved to be "remembered and recognised for his fantastic contribution to the war effort" and not for his later criminal conviction. It was only the fourth royal pardon granted since the conclusion of the Second World War. Pardons are normally granted only when the person is technically innocent, and a request has been made by the family or other interested party; neither condition was met in regard to Turing's conviction.

=== Alan Turing law and subsequent recognition ===
In September 2016, the government announced its intention to expand this retroactive exoneration to other men convicted of similar historical indecency offences. Described informally as the Alan Turing law, it is the part of the Policing and Crime Act 2017 that retroactively pardoned men cautioned or convicted under historical legislation that outlawed homosexual acts. Due to his repeated attempts to bring attention to the issue, Leech is now regularly described as the "architect" of Turing's pardon and subsequently the Alan Turing law, which went on to secure pardons for 75,000 other men and women. At the British premiere of a film based on Turing's life, The Imitation Game, the producers thanked Leech for bringing the topic to public attention and securing Turing's pardon.

In 2021, naming Turing as an example, the Government Equalities Office described court-ordered hormone therapy, or chemical castration, as a form of conversion therapy. Additionally, it documented how such practices may involve coercion and abuse of authority, undermine informed consent, and cause psychological harm through self-rejection and internalised stigma. On 19 July 2023, following an apology to LGBT veterans from the UK Government, Defence Secretary Ben Wallace suggested Turing should be honoured with a permanent statue on the fourth plinth of Trafalgar Square, describing Turing as "probably the greatest war hero, in my book, of the Second World War, [whose] achievements shortened the war, saved thousands of lives, helped defeat the Nazis. And his story is a sad story of a society and how it treated him."

== See also ==
- List of things named after Alan Turing
- List of suicides of LGBTQ people
- List of pioneers in computer science
- Peter Hogg, Turing's friend from Sherborne
- Thought § Computationalism

=== Works cited ===
- Alexander, C. Hugh O'D. "Cryptographic History of Work on the German Naval Enigma". The National Archives, Kew, Reference HW 25/1. Archived from the original on 17 February 2022.
- Beavers, Anthony (2013). "Alan Turing: Mathematical Mechanist". In Cooper, S. Barry; van Leeuwen, Jan (eds.). Alan Turing: His Work and Impact. Waltham: Elsevier. pp. 481–485. ISBN 978-0-12-386980-7.
- Church, Alonzo (1936). "An Unsolvable Problem of Elementary Number Theory". American Journal of Mathematics. 58 (2): 345–363. doi:10.2307/2371045. ISSN 0002-9327. JSTOR 2371045.
- Copeland, B. Jack (2004a). "Colossus: Its Origins and Originators". IEEE Annals of the History of Computing. 26 (4): 38–45. Bibcode:2004IAHC...26d..38C. doi:10.1109/MAHC.2004.26. S2CID 20209254.
- Copeland, B. Jack, ed. (2004b). The Essential Turing. Oxford: Oxford University Press. ISBN 978-0-19-825079-1. OCLC 156728127.
- Copeland, B. Jack (2006). Colossus: The secrets of Bletchley Park's code-breaking computers. Oxford University Press. ISBN 978-0-19-284055-4.
  - Hilton, Peter (2006). "Living with Fish: Breaking Tunny in the Newmanry and Testery". Colossus. in Copeland 2006, pp. 189–203
- Gannon, Paul (2007) [2006]. Colossus: Bletchley Park's Greatest Secret. London: Atlantic Books. ISBN 978-1-84354-331-2.
- Hodges, Andrew (1983). Alan Turing: The Enigma. London: Burnett Books Ltd. ISBN 978-0-09-152130-1.; basis of the film The Imitation Game
- Hodges, Andrew (2012). Alan Turing: The Enigma. Vintage. ISBN 978-0-09-911641-7.
- Leavitt, David (2007). The man who knew too much: Alan Turing and the invention of the computer. Phoenix. ISBN 978-0-7538-2200-5.
- Lewin, Ronald (2008) [1978]. Ultra Goes to War: The Secret Story. Barnsley: Pen & Sword. ISBN 978-1-84415-663-4.
- Mahon, A. P. (June 1945). The History of Hut Eight, 1939 - 1945. National Archives, Kew: United Kingdom. Archived from the original on 20 February 2007 – via ellsbury.com. "Reference HW 25/2"
  In 1996, a copy was released to the National Archives and Records Administration. Then a copy was released to National Archives, Kew. Mahon's account is first-hand from October 1941. Also published as a book chapter (doi:10.1093/oso/9780198250791.003.0010), and a volume in a series.
- Oakley, Brian, ed. (2006). The Bletchley Park War Diaries: July 1939 – August 1945 (2.6 ed.). Wynne Press.
- Sipser, Michael (2006). Introduction to the Theory of Computation. PWS Publishing. ISBN 978-0-534-95097-2.
- Turing, A. M. (1937) [Delivered to the Society November 1936]. "On Computable Numbers, with an Application to the Entscheidungsproblem" (PDF). Proceedings of the London Mathematical Society. 2. Vol. 42, no. 1. pp. 230–65. doi:10.1112/plms/s2-42.1.230. Archived (PDF) from the original on 6 May 2011.
