= Pancrinol =

Historical medicine

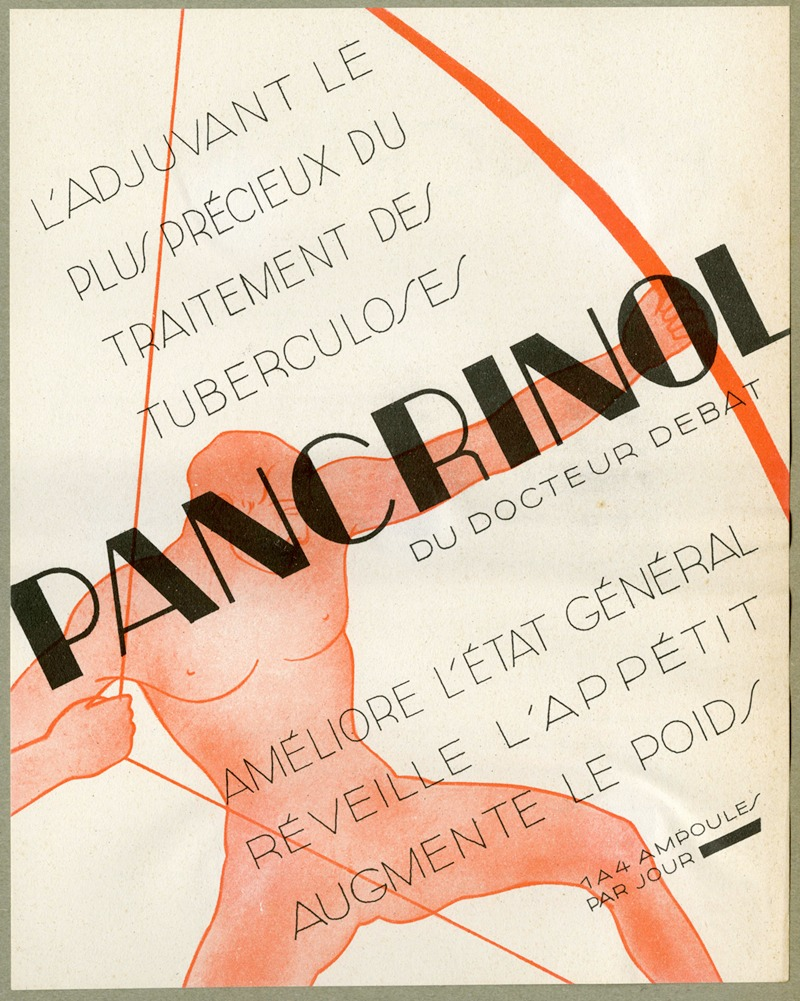
Advertisement for Pancrinol

Pancrinol was a French organotherapy (opothérapie) preparation marketed in the early 20th century by the laboratories of Dr. François Debat (Paris/Garches). Contemporary promotional material presented it as a multi-organ extract tonic supplied in drinkable ampoules.

== Background ==
In the interwar period, organotherapy products (opothérapie) became widely commercialized in France. Debat's laboratory is cited among firms that developed pluriglandular preparations such as Pancrinol alongside other animal extracts.

Scholarly work on the periodical Art et Médecine has also described how the publication could blend medicine and artistic content with extensive promotional material for Debat products, including multi-page advertorial content about Pancrinol.

== Composition and marketing ==
Primary promotional sources described Pancrinol as a preparation made from animal organ extracts (including liver, spleen, kidney and adrenal tissue) and marketed it as a general tonic, including for anaemia and tuberculosis, reflecting the therapeutic claims typical of organotherapy advertising at the time.

== Use in sport ==
Historical academic discussion of early "stimulation" and performance-oriented approaches in sport has mentioned Pancrinol in connection with athletes and, in particular, cyclists, in the context of pharmaceutical tonics used during the interwar period.

== See also ==
- Organotherapy
- Patent medicine
- Doping in sport

== Bibliography ==
- Revue Art et Médecine, no. 1, Octobre 1930
- Sport et dopage : la grande hypocrisie, François Bellocq avec la collaboration de Serge Bressan, éditions du Félin, 1991
