= Unorganized machine =

An unorganized machine is a concept mentioned in a 1948 report by Alan Turing titled "Intelligent Machinery", in which he suggested that the infant human cortex was what he called an "unorganised machine". It remained unpublished until 1969.

== Overview ==
Turing defined the class of unorganized machines as largely random in their initial construction, but capable of being trained to perform particular tasks. Turing's unorganized machines were in fact very early examples of randomly connected, binary neural networks, and Turing claimed that these were the simplest possible model of the nervous system.

Turing had been interested in the possibility of simulating neural systems for at least the previous two years. In correspondence with William Ross Ashby in 1946 he writes:

I am more interested in the possibility of producing models of the action of the brain than in the applications to practical computing...although the brain may in fact operate by changing its neuron circuits by the growth of axons and dendrites, we could nevertheless make a model, within the ACE, in which this possibility was allowed for, but in which the actual construction of the ACE did not alter, but only the remembered data

In his 1948 paper Turing defined two examples of his unorganized machines. The first were A-type machines — these being essentially randomly connected networks of NAND logic gates. The second were called B-type machines, which could be created by taking an A-type machine and replacing every inter-node connection with a structure called a connection modifier — which itself is made from A-type nodes. The purpose of the connection modifiers were to allow the B-type machine to undergo "appropriate interference, mimicking education" in order to organize the behaviour of the network to perform useful work. Before the term genetic algorithm was coined, Turing even proposed the use of what he called a genetical search to configure his unorganized machines. Turing claimed that the behaviour of B-type machines could be very complex when the number of nodes in the network was large, and stated that the "picture of the cortex as an unorganized machine is very satisfactory from the point of view of evolution and genetics".
