= Systems of Logic Based on Ordinals =

1938 doctoral thesis by Alan Turing

Systems of Logic Based on Ordinals was the PhD dissertation of the mathematician Alan Turing.

The thesis was completed at Princeton under Alonzo Church and was a classic work in mathematics that introduced the concept of ordinal logic.

The thesis is an exploration of formal mathematical systems after Gödel's theorem. Gödel showed that for any formal system S powerful enough to represent arithmetic, there is a theorem G that is true but the system is unable to prove. G could be added as an additional axiom to the system in place of a proof. However this would create a new system S' with its own unprovable true theorem G', and so on. Turing's thesis looks at what happens if you simply iterate this process repeatedly, generating an infinite set of new axioms to add to the original theory, and even goes one step further in using transfinite recursion to go "past infinity", yielding a set of new theories G_{α}, one for each ordinal number α.

Turing's thesis is not about a new type of formal logic, nor was he interested in so-called "ranked logic" systems derived from ordinal or relative numbering, in which comparisons can be made between truth-states on the basis of relative veracity. Instead, Turing investigated the possibility of resolving the Gödelian incompleteness condition using Cantor's method of infinites.

Martin Davis states that although Turing's use of a computing oracle is not a major focus of the dissertation, it has proven to be highly influential in theoretical computer science, e.g. in the polynomial-time hierarchy.

== Versions ==
"Facsimile" (PDF). Seeley G. Mudd Manuscript Library Princeton, NJ: webspace.princeton.edu – via archive.org.
"Transcribed" (PDF). www.dcc.fc.up.pt - Departamento de Ciência de Computadores Faculdade de Ciências da Universidade do Porto: University of Porto.
