= Edwin Tenney Brewster =

American author

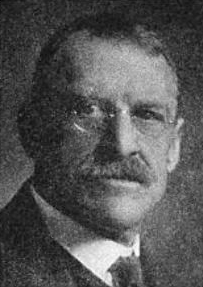
- Born: October 11, 1866; Lawrence, Massachusetts, U.S.
- Died: March 14, 1960 (aged 93); Brownfield, Maine, U.S.
- Education: Harvard College

Edwin Tenney Brewster (October 11, 1866 – March 14, 1960) was an American physicist and popular science writer.

== Early life ==
He was born on October 11, 1866, in Lawrence, Massachusetts, United States.

He died on March 14, 1960, in Brownfield, Oxford County, Maine.

== Personal life ==
His parents were John Leander Brewster and Adaline "Ada" Augusta Tenney.

He was married to Lillian Edna Dodge and had three children.

== Education ==
He completed his bachelor's degree from Harvard College in 1890. He completed his master's degree from Harvard College in 1891.

== Career ==
He worked as a science teacher at these schools:

- Brewster Academy
- Phillips Academy

He authored a large number of books, most notably Natural Wonders Every Child Should Know.

== Bibliography ==
His notable books include:

- Life and Letters of Josiah Dwight Whitney (1909)
- Natural Wonders Every Child Should Know (1912)
- The Nutrition of a Household (1915)
- Vocational Guidance for the Professions (1917)
- The Understanding of Religion (1923)
- This Puzzling Planet: An Introduction to Geology (1928)
