= Organotherapy =

Treatment of disease by the administration of animal organs or their extracts

Organotherapy, also known as opotherapy, is a historical treatment that uses preparations derived from animal or human organs, glands, or tissues to treat medical conditions.

Historically, it primarily involved administering, injecting, or transplanting animal organs, glandular extracts, or tissues in an attempt to replace absent or insufficient internal secretions. This contributed to the development of modern hormone therapy and endocrinology.

Animal organs and tissues had been used medicinally in several premodern traditions, practices later characterized as precedents of organotherapy. The modern organotherapy movement emerged in 1889, when French physiologist Charles-Édouard Brown-Séquard reported injecting himself with extracts from dog and guinea-pig testes in an attempt to counter the effects of aging. Interest in organotherapy increased after English physician, George Redmayne Murray, successfully treated myxoedema with injections of sheep-thyroid extract in 1891, and preparations derived from numerous other organs and glands were subsequently investigated and marketed.

Organotherapy produced mixed therapeutic results: thyroid preparations provided effective replacement treatment, while many other glandular extracts and combinations were ineffective, poorly standardized, or promoted without systematic evidence of safety and efficacy. As active hormones were isolated, characterized, and eventually synthesized, crude organ preparations were largely displaced by standardized hormone therapies. Animal-derived desiccated thyroid remains available for the treatment of hypothyroidism, although synthetic levothyroxine is generally recommended as the standard first-line treatment.

The term organotherapy is also used in homeopathy for highly diluted preparations made from healthy animal organs or tissues, a practice distinct from historical glandular replacement therapies.

In early 20th century France, it was used to support sporting performance, particularly in cycling, using preparations like Pancrinol.
