= Heidi Thomas =

English screenwriter and playwright

Heidi Thomas OBE
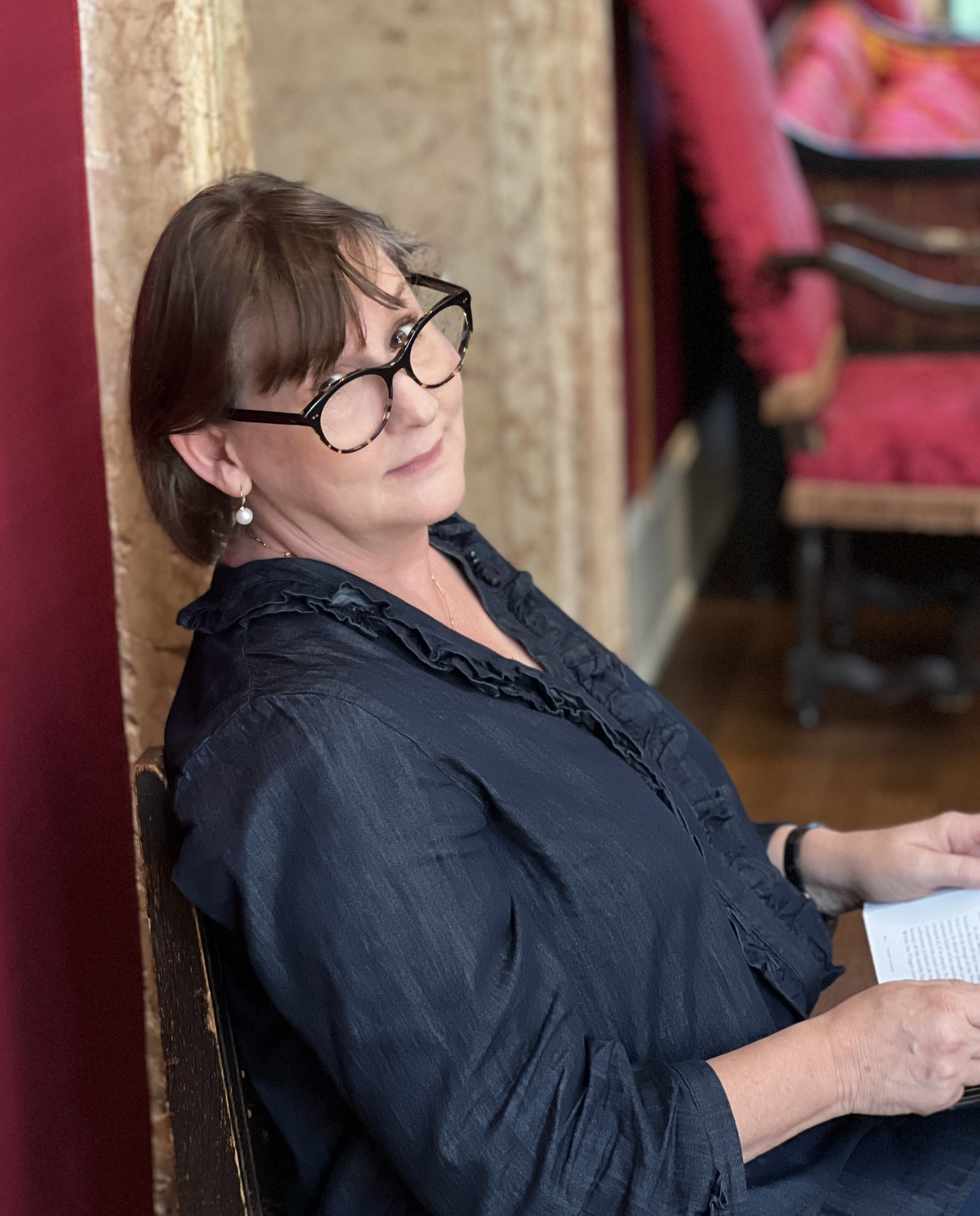
- Thomas in 2022
- Born: Heidi Louise Thomas; 13 August 1962 (age 64); Liverpool, England
- Education: University of Liverpool
- Occupations: Screenwriter, playwright
- Years active: 1986–present
- Spouse: Stephen McGann (m. 1990)
- Children: 1
- Family: Joe McGann (brother-in-law); Paul McGann (brother-in-law); Mark McGann (brother-in-law); Joseph McGann (nephew); Jake McGann (nephew)

Heidi Louise Thomas McGann OBE (née Thomas; born 13 August 1962) is an English screenwriter and playwright. She is best known as the creator of Call The Midwife.

== Career ==
After reading English at Liverpool University, Thomas gained national attention when her play Shamrocks and Crocodiles won the John Whiting Award in 1985. Her play Indigo was performed by the Royal Shakespeare Company in its 1987/88 season. Her other theatrical work includes Some Singing Blood at London's Royal Court Theatre, and an adaptation of Ibsen's The Lady from the Sea, presented in London and at the National Theatre of Norway in Oslo. Her play The House of Special Purpose was staged at the Chichester Festival Theatre in 2010.

Screen adaptations she has written include the feature film I Capture the Castle (2003) and a BBC television adaptation of Madame Bovary (2000). In 2007 she was the creator, writer and executive producer of BBC period drama Lilies. She wrote the screenplays for two major BBC adaptations of Elizabeth Gaskell's Cranford, and a film adaptation of the Noel Streatfeild novel Ballet Shoes.

In 2010 she was writer and executive producer of a major revival of the classic British television drama series Upstairs, Downstairs for the BBC. In 2011 she wrote and co-produced an adaptation of the Call the Midwife trilogy of books by Jennifer Worth. The series achieved record viewing figures for the channel. A second and third series aired in subsequent years. In February 2014 BBC announced that a 2014 Christmas Special and a fourth series had been commissioned. A fifth series was commissioned for 2016, shortly after series four was done filming. On 23 November 2016, the BBC announced a three-year deal with Neal Street Productions, commissioning a seventh, eighth and ninth series, all with Christmas specials. Having ordered series ten and eleven, and despite COVID-19 pandemic, the BBC announced in April 2020 that it had commissioned series 12 and 13, taking episodes into 2024. She made a cameo appearance in series 15, episode 8 as an unnamed deceased nun.

In March 2008, she received the Best Writer award at the UK Royal Television Society awards for her work on Cranford. In April 2008 she received the Best Writer award at the UK Broadcasting Press Guild Awards for her work on Cranford, Ballet Shoes, and Lilies. She was nominated for two BAFTA TV Awards for Cranford as well as a Primetime Emmy. In November 2008 she received the Writers' Guild of Great Britain award for Best TV Series for Cranford. In 2011 she received a Primetime Emmy nomination for Upstairs Downstairs. In December 2012, the annual UK 'Women in Film and Television' awards presented her with the Technicolor Writing Award in recognition of her contribution to the industry.

A production of the musical Gigi was newly adapted by Thomas and ran at the Kennedy Center in January 2015, and then on Broadway, closing in June 2015.

In January 2019, Thomas was presented with the Outstanding Contribution to Writing Award by the Writers' Guild of Great Britain for her body of professional work. In December of that year, Thomas was a guest on BBC Radio 4's Desert Island Discs, selecting music by Joni Mitchell, The Beatles and Gabriel Fauré, among others.

In 2021, Thomas wrote the screenplay for Allelujah, a film adaptation of Alan Bennett's play Allelujah!, first staged by Nicholas Hytner at the Bridge Theatre in London. The film stars Jennifer Saunders, Bally Gill, Russell Tovey, David Bradley, Derek Jacobi, and Judi Dench and was directed by Richard Eyre.The film was released in 2022.

Thomas is an honorary associate of the London Film School, and has honorary doctorates from the University of Liverpool and Edge Hill University.

Thomas was appointed Officer of the Order of the British Empire (OBE) in the 2022 Birthday Honours for services to drama.

== Family ==
Thomas is married to actor Stephen McGann, who plays Dr Turner in Call the Midwife, with whom she has a son, Dominic.

== Selected works ==
=== Film ===
- Allelujah, 2022

=== Television ===
- Madame Bovary, 2000, BBC One
- I Capture the Castle, 2003, BBC Films
- Lilies, 2007, BBC One
- Ballet Shoes, 2007, BBC One
- Cranford, 2007, BBC One
- Cranford Christmas Special, 2009, BBC One
- Upstairs Downstairs, 2010-2012, BBC One
- Call the Midwife, 2012–present, BBC One
- Little Women, 2017 BBC One

=== Theatre ===
- All Flesh is Grass, 1984, National Youth Theatre
- Indigo, 1988, Royal Shakespeare Company and Almeida Theatre, London
- Shamrocks and Crocodiles, 1987, Liverpool Playhouse and National Theatre Studio
- Some Singing Blood, 1992, Royal Court Theatre
- The House of Special Purpose, 2009, Chichester Festival Theatre
