= Derek Jacobi on screen and stage =

Derek Jacobi's appearances

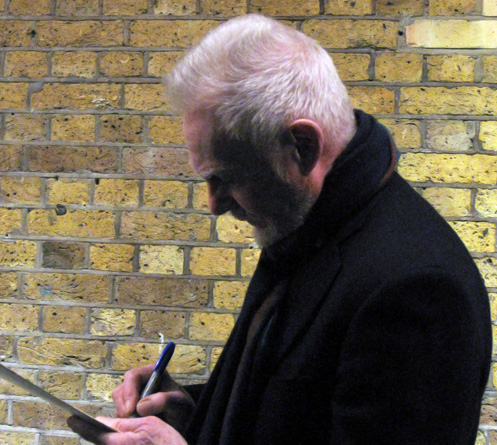
Jacobi in London, 2009

Sir Derek Jacobi is an English actor. Known for his roles on stage and screen as well as for his work at the Royal National Theatre, he has received numerous accolades including a Tony Award, a British Academy Television Award, two Laurence Olivier Awards, and two Primetime Emmy Awards. He was given a knighthood for his services to theatre by Queen Elizabeth II in 1994.

== Film ==
List of Derek Jacobi film credits
Year	Title	Role	Notes	Ref.
1965	Othello	Cassio		
1968	Interlude	Paul		
1970	Three Sisters	Andrei Prozorov		
1973	The Day of the Jackal	Caron		
1973	Blue Blood	Gregory		
1974	The Odessa File	Klaus Wenzer		
1978	The Medusa Touch	Townley		
1979	The Human Factor	Arthur Davis		
1980	The Man Who Went Up in Smoke	Martin Beck		
1981	Charlotte	Daberlohn		
1982	The Secret of NIMH	Nicodemus	Voice	
1982	Enigma	Kurt Limmer		
1987	Little Dorrit	Arthur Clennam		
1989	Henry V	Chorus		
1990	The Fool	Mr. Frederick/Sir John		
1991	Dead Again	Franklyn Madson		
1996	Looking for Richard	Himself		
1996	Hamlet	Claudius		
1998	Basil	Father Frederick		
1998	Love Is the Devil: Study for a Portrait of Francis Bacon	Francis Bacon		
1999	Molokai: The Story of Father Damien	Father Leonor Fousnel		
2000	Up at the Villa	Lucky Leadbetter		
2000	Gladiator	Gracchus		
2001	The Body	Father Lavelle		
2001	Revelation	Librarian		
2001	Gosford Park	Probert		
2001	The Diaries of Vaslav Nijinsky	Nijinsky		
2002	Revengers Tragedy	The Duke		
2002	Two Men Went to War	Major Merton		
2004	Strings	Nezo		
2004	Cloud Cuckoo Land	Victor		
2005	Bye Bye Blackbird	Lord Dempsey		
2005	Nanny McPhee	Mr. Wheen		
2006	Underworld: Evolution	Alexander Corvinus		
2007	Airlock Or How To Say Goodbye In Space	President		
2007	The Riddle	Charles Dickens		
2007	The Golden Compass	Magisterial Emissary		
2008	A Bunch of Amateurs	Nigel		
2008	Adam Resurrected	Dr. Nathan Gross		
2009	Morris: A Life with Bells On	Quentin Neely		
2009	Endgame	Rudolf Agnew		
2009	Charles Dickens's England	Himself		
2010	Hippie Hippie Shake	Judge		
2010	The King's Speech	Cosmo Gordon Lang		
2010	Hereafter	Himself		
2011	Ironclad	Cornhill		
2011	There Be Dragons	Honorio		
2011	Anonymous	Prologue		
2011	My Week with Marilyn	Sir Owen Morshead		
2012	Jail Caesar	Sulla		
2013	Effie Gray	Travers Twiss		
2014	Grace of Monaco	Count Fernando D'Aillieres		
2015	Cinderella	The King		
2016	The History of Love	Léo Gursky		
2016	The Bed-Sitting Room	Lord Fortnum		
2017	Stratton	Ross		
2017	Murder on the Orient Express	Edward Masterman		
2018	Tomb Raider	Mr. Yaffe		
2019	The Warrior Queen of Jhansi	Lord Palmerston		
2019	Tolkien	Prof. Joseph Wright		
2019	Horrible Histories: The Movie – Rotten Romans	Claudius		
2019	Muse	The Lawyer		
2020	The Host	Dr. Hobson		
2020	Come Away	Mr. Brown		
2020	Say Your Prayers	Father Enoch		
2021	A Bird Flew In	David		
2022	Allelujah	Ambrose		
2023	The Martini Shot	Errol		
2024	Gladiator II	Senator Gracchus		
2025	Juliet & Romeo	The Friar		
2025	Moss & Freud	Lucian Freud		
2025	Tinsel Town	Albert		
2026	Heartstopper Forever	Pete	Featured	
2026	Frank and Percy		Post-production	

== Television ==
Year	Title	Role	Notes	Ref.
1961	BBC Sunday-Night Play	Charles Marlow	Episode: "She Stoops to Conquer"	
1962	Armchair Theatre	Eric	Episode: "The Fishing Match"	
1967	Much Ado About Nothing	Don Pedro, Prince of Aragon	TV adaptation of the National Theatre Zeffirelli production	
1968	ITV Playhouse	Jerry	Episode: "The Photographer"	
1971	The Rivals of Sherlock Holmes	William Drew	Episode: "The Secret of the Foxhunter"	
1972	Man of Straw	Diederich Hessling	6 episodes	
1972	The Strauss Family	Joseph Lanner	2 episodes	
1972	Budgie	Herbert Fletcher	2 episodes	
1974	The Pallisers	Lord Fawn	8 episodes	
1975	Affairs of the Heart	Bertram Braddle	Episode: "Elizabeth"	
1976	I, Claudius	Claudius	12 episodes	
1977	Philby, Burgess and MacLean	Guy Burgess	TV movie	
1978	Tycoon	Timothy West	Episode: "What Price a Life"	
1978	Jackanory	Narrator	5 episodes reading 'Tales from Tartary' by James Riordan	
1978	Richard II	Richard II	BBC-TV	
1979	Minder	Freddie Fenton	Episode: "The Bounty Hunter"	
1980–82	Tales of the Unexpected	Drioli	2 episodes	
1980	Hamlet	Hamlet	TV movie	
1982	The Hunchback of Notre Dame	Frollo	TV movie	
1982	Inside the Third Reich	Adolf Hitler	TV movie	
1982	Tales of the Unexpected	Performer	2 episodes	
1985	Cyrano de Bergerac	Cyrano de Bergerac	Channel 4 TV presentation of the Terry Hands RSC production	
1986	Mr Pye	Mr. Pye	4 episodes	
1986	David Macaulay: Cathedral	Pierre	TV movie	
1987	The Secret Garden	Archibald Craven	TV movie	
1988	The Tenth Man	The Imposter	TV movie	
1990	The Civil War	Various	Voice, 9 episodes	
1990	The Storyteller	Daedalus	1 episode	
1992	Aladdin	The Magician	Voice, TV movie	
1994	The World of Peter Rabbit and Friends	Mr Jeremy Fisher	1 episode	
1994–98	Cadfael	Brother Cadfael	13 episodes	
1994	The Secret Garden	Archibald Craven	Voice, TV movie	
1996	Breaking the Code	Alan Turing	TV movie	
2000	The Wyvern Mystery	Squire Fairfield	TV movie	
2000	Jason and the Argonauts	Phineus	TV movie	
2001	Frasier	Jackson Hedley	Episode: "The Show Must Go Off"	
2002	The Jury	George Cording QC	6 episodes	
2002	The Edwardian Country House	The Narrator	All episodes	
2002	The Gathering Storm	Stanley Baldwin	TV movie	
2003	Henry VIII	Narrator	Voice, TV Serial	
2004	London	Tacitus	TV movie	
2004	The Long Firm	Lord Edward Thursby	2 episodes	
2004	Marple	Colonel Protheroe	Episode: "The Murder at the Vicarage"	
2007	Doctor Who	The Master / Professor Yana	Episode: "Utopia"	
2007	The Old Curiosity Shop	Grandfather	TV movie	
2007–09	Mist: The Tale of a Sheepdog Puppy	Narrator	38 episodes	
2007–09	In the Night Garden...	Narrator	100 episodes	
2011	The Borgias	Cardinal Orsini	2 episodes	
2012	Titanic: Blood and Steel	William Pirrie	12 episodes	
2012–20	Last Tango in Halifax	Alan Buttershaw	5 series - 24 episodes, BBC	
2013–16	Vicious	Stuart Bixby	2 series - 14 episodes, PBS	
2014, 2016	The Amazing World of Gumball	Narrator/Moon	Episodes: "The Lie", "The Night"	
2016	Inside No. 9	Dennis Fulcher	Episode: "The Devil of Christmas"	
2017	A Christmas Carol Goes Wrong	Scrooge / Self	TV movie	
2018	Les Misérables	Bishop	Episode: #1.1	
2019–26	Good Omens	Metatron	4 episodes	
2019	The Crown	Prince Edward, Duke of Windsor	Guest role (Season 3); Episode: "Dangling Man"	
2021	Inside No. 9	Mr Webster	Episode: "How Do You Plead?"	
2021	The Lost Pirate Kingdom	Narrator	TV series Docudrama	
2022	The Sandman	Erasmus Fry	Episode: "Calliope"	
2023	The Following Events Are Based on a Pack of Lies	Sir Ralph Unwin	5 episodes	
2024	Extraordinary	Himself (voice)	Episode: "Meet the Parent"	
2024	Ludwig	Mr. Todd	Episode #1.5	
2024	Family Guy	Rupert (voice)	Episode: "Peter, Peter, Pumpkin Cheater"	

== Theatre ==
Year	Title	Role	Venue	Ref.
1959	Henry IV, Part 2	Henry, Prince of Wales	Cambridge Arts Theatre, Cambridge	
1959	Love's Labour's Lost	Bertram Berowne	Lyric Opera House, London	
1959	Saint's Day	Giles Aldus	ADC Theatre, Cambridge	
1960	Cymbeline	Iachimo	Cambridge Arts Theatre, Cambridge	
1960	The Duenna	Ferdinand	ADC Theatre, Cambridge	
1960	Friar Bacon and Friar Bungay	Edward	Cambridge Arts Theatre, Cambridge	
1960	Dr. Faustus	Evil Angel	Cambridge Arts Theatre, Cambridge	
1963	Hamlet	Laertes	The Old Vic, London	
1963	Saint Joan	Brother Martin Ladvenu	The Old Vic, London	
1963	The Recruiting Officer	Mr Worthy	The Old Vic, London	
1964	Andorra	Fedri, a journeyman carpenter	The Old Vic, London	
1964	Othello	Cassio	The Old Vic, London	
1964	Hay Fever	Simon Bliss	Opera House, Manchester	
1964	The Master Builder	Ragnar Brovik	The Old Vic, London	
1964	The Royal Hunt of the Sun	Felipillo	Chichester Festival Theatre	
1965	Much Ado About Nothing	Don John, then Don Pedro, Prince of Aragon	The Old Vic, London	
1965	Armstrong's Last Goodnight	1st Scots Commissioner	Chichester Festival Theatre	
1965	Trelawny of the "Wells"	Captain de Foenix	Chichester Festival Theatre	
1966	Black Comedy	Brindsley Miller	Chichester Festival Theatre	
1967	As You Like It	Touchstone	The Old Vic, London	
1967	Tartuffe	The Officer	The Old Vic, London	
1967	Three Sisters	Andrei Sergeyevich, then Baron Tusenbach	The Old Vic, London	
1968	The Advertisement	Lorenzo	Theatre Royal, Brighton	
1968	Love's Labour's Lost	Duke Ferdinand, King of Navarre	The Old Vic, London	
1968	Edward II	Bishop of Coventry	The Old Vic, London	
1968	The Covent-Garden Tragedy; A Most Unwarrantable Intrusion; In His Own Write	Intruder	The Old Vic, London	
1969	Back to Methuselah, Part One	Adam (In The Beginning)	The Old Vic, London	
1969	Back to Methuselah, Part Two	Ozymandias (As Far as Thought can Reach)	The Old Vic, London	
1969	Macrune's Guevara	Edward Hotel	Jeanetta Cochrane Theatre	
1969	The White Devil	Count Lodovico	The Old Vic, London	
1970	The Idiot adapted Gray	Prince Leo Nikolaievich Myshkin	The Old Vic, London	
1970	The Beaux' Stratagem	Foigard	The Old Vic, London	
1970	The Merchant of Venice	Gratiano	The Old Vic, London	
1971	A Woman Killed with Kindness	Sir Charles Mountford	The Old Vic, London	
1972	The Real Inspector Hound	Moon	Phoenix Theatre, London	
1979	Hamlet	Hamlet	The Old Vic, London	
1980	The Suicide	Semyon S. Podsekalnikov	ANTA Theatre, Broadway	
1982–84	The Tempest	Prospero	Royal Shakespeare Company	
1982–84	Peer Gynt	Peer Gynt	Royal Shakespeare Company	
1982–85	Much Ado About Nothing	Signior Benedick of Padua	Royal Shakespeare Company; Gershwin Theatre, Broadway	
1983–85	Cyrano de Bergerac	Cyrano de Bergerac	Royal Shakespeare Company, Barbican Theatre, London; Gershwin Theatre, Broadway	
1987	Breaking the Code	Alan Turing	Neil Simon Theatre, Broadway	
1993–94	Macbeth	Macbeth	Barbican Theatre, London; Royal Shakespeare Theatre	
2000	Uncle Vanya	Ivan Petrovich Voinitsky	Brooks Atkinson Theatre, Broadway	
2002–03	The Tempest	Prospero	The Old Vic, London	
2005	Don Carlos	Philip II	Gielgud Theatre, London	
2006	A Voyage Round My Father	Father	Wyndham's Theatre, London	
2009	Twelfth Night	Malvolio	Wyndham's Theatre, London	
2010	King Lear	King Lear	Brooklyn Academy of Music, Off-Broadway	
2016	Romeo and Juliet	Mercutio	Garrick Theatre, West End	
