= List of awards and nominations received by Derek Jacobi =

Derek Jacobi awards and nominations
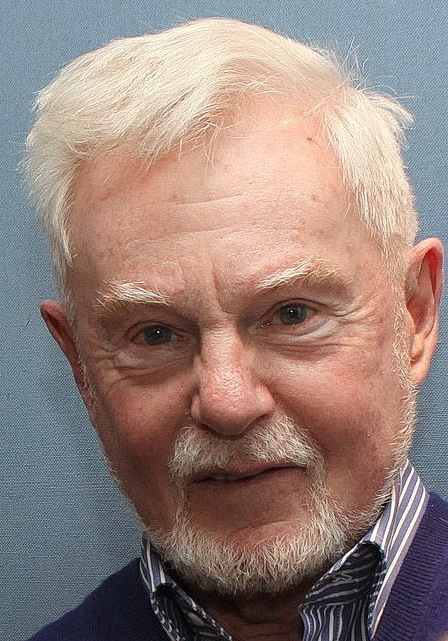
- Jacobi in 2013
Awards and nominations
Award	Wins	Nominations
BAFTA Awards	1	5
Emmy Awards	2	3
Golden Globes	0	1
Olivier Awards	2	7
SAG Awards	2	3
Tony Awards	1	2

Totals (Note: Certain award groups do not simply award one winner. They acknowledge several different recipients, have runners-up, and have third place. Since this is a specific recognition and is different from losing an award, runner-up mentions are considered wins in this award tally. For simplification and to avoid errors, each award in this list has been presumed to have had a prior nomination.)
- Wins: 13
- Nominations: 54

Derek Jacobi is an English actor. Known for his roles on stage and screen as well as for his work at the Royal National Theatre, he has received numerous accolades including a Tony Award, a British Academy Television Award, two Laurence Olivier Awards, and two Primetime Emmy Awards. He was given a knighthood for his services to theatre by Queen Elizabeth II in 1994.

For his work in theatre Jacobi received two Tony Award nominations winning for his performance in a Broadway revival of William Shakespeare's Much Ado About Nothing in 1985. He also received seven Laurence Olivier Award nominations winning twice for Best Actor for his performances for revivals of Cyrano de Bergerac in 1983, and Twelfth Night in 2009, as well as being awarded the Society of London Theatre Special Award.

For his work on television and film, he has been nominated for five BAFTAs, winning for Best Actor for I, Claudius in 1976. He also received three Primetime Emmy Award nominations winning twice for his performances in The Tenth Man (1988), and Frasier in 2001. For his work on film he received three Screen Actors Guild Award for Outstanding Performance by a Cast in a Motion Picture nominations, winning twice with the ensemble casts of Gosford Park (2001), and The Kings Speech (2010).

== Major associations ==
=== BAFTA Awards ===
Year	Category	Nominated work	Result	Ref.
British Academy Film Awards
1992	Best Actor in a Supporting Role	Dead Again	Nominated	
British Academy Television Awards
1977	Best Actor	I, Claudius	Won	
1978	Best Actor	Philby, Burgess and MacLean	Nominated	
1998	Best Actor	Breaking the Code	Nominated	
2013	Best Actor	Last Tango in Halifax	Nominated	

=== Emmy Awards ===
Year	Category	Nominated work	Result	Ref.
Primetime Emmy Awards
1982	Outstanding Supporting Actor in a Limited Series or a Special	Inside the Third Reich	Nominated	
1989	Outstanding Supporting Actor in a Limited Series or a Special	The Tenth Man	Won	
2001	Outstanding Guest Actor in a Comedy Series	Frasier: The Show Must Go Off	Won	

=== Golden Globe Awards ===
Year	Category	Nominated work	Result	Ref.
1989	Best Supporting Actor – Television	The Tenth Man	Nominated	

=== Olivier Awards ===
Year	Category	Nominated work	Result	Ref.
1977	Best Actor in a Revival	Hamlet	Nominated	
1978	Best Actor in a Revival	Ivanov	Nominated	
1983	Best Actor in a Revival	Cyrano de Bergerac	Won	
1986	Best Actor	Breaking the Code	Nominated	
2006	Best Actor	Don Carlos	Nominated	
2009	Best Actor	Twelfth Night	Won	
2011	Best Actor	King Lear	Nominated	
2023	Society of London Theatre Special Award	—N/a	Honored	

=== Screen Actors Guild Awards ===
Year	Category	Nominated work	Result	Ref.
2000	Outstanding Performance by a Cast in a Motion Picture	Gladiator	Nominated	
2001	Outstanding Performance by a Cast in a Motion Picture	Gosford Park	Won	
2010	Outstanding Performance by a Cast in a Motion Picture	The King's Speech	Won	

=== Tony Awards ===
Year	Category	Nominated work	Result	Ref.
1985	Best Actor in a Play	Much Ado About Nothing	Won	
1988	Best Actor in a Play	Breaking the Code	Nominated	

== Theatre Awards ==
=== Drama Desk Award ===
Year	Category	Nominated work	Result	Ref.
1980	Outstanding Actor in a Play	The Suicide	Nominated	
1985	Outstanding Actor in a Play	Much Ado About Nothing / Cyrano de Bergerac	Nominated	
1988	Outstanding Actor in a Play	Breaking the Code	Nominated	

=== Evening Standard Awards ===
Year	Category	Nominated work	Result	Ref.
1983	Best Actor	Much Ado About Nothing	Won	
1987	Best Actor	Little Dorrit	Won	
1999	Best Actor	Love is the Devil	Won	

== Critics Awards ==
Year	Award	Category	Nominated work	Result
1983	Critics' Circle Theatre Awards	Best Actor	Cyrano de Bergerac; Much Ado About Nothing	Won
2002	Broadcast Film Critics Association	Best Acting Ensemble	Gosford Park	Won
2002	Florida Film Critics Circle Award	Best Cast	Gosford Park	Won
2002	Online Film Critics Society Award	Best Ensemble	Gosford Park	Won
2002	Satellite Award	Best Cast - Motion Picture	Gosford Park	Won
2010	Santa Barbara International Film Festival	Best Acting Ensemble	The King's Speech	Won
2010	Phoenix Film Critics Society	Best Ensemble Acting	The King's Speech	Nominated

Film

Year	Award	Category	Nominated work	Result
1998	Satellite Award	Best Actor - Film Drama	Love Is the Devil: Study for a Portrait of Francis Bacon	Nominated
1998	Edinburgh International Film Festival	Best Actor	Love Is the Devil: Study for a Portrait of Francis Bacon	Won

Audio

Year	Award	Category	Nominated work	Result
2019	BBC Audio Drama Awards	Best Actor	The War Master: Beneath the Viscoid	Shortlisted

Honorary

Year	Nominated work	Award	Result
2008	Lifetime Achievement	Helen Hayes Award	Won
