= Allelujah (film) =

2022 British drama film

- Theatrical release poster
- Directed by: Richard Eyre
- Written by: Heidi Thomas; Alan Bennett
- Produced by: Damian Jones; Kevin Loader
- Starring: Jennifer Saunders; Bally Gill; Russell Tovey; David Bradley; Derek Jacobi; Judi Dench
- Cinematography: Ben Smithard
- Edited by: John Wilson
- Music by: George Fenton
- Production companies: Pathé; BBC Film; Ingenious Media; DJ Films; Redstart Productions
- Distributed by: Warner Bros. Pictures
- Release dates: 11 September 2022 (TIFF); 17 March 2023 (United Kingdom)
- Running time: 99 minutes
- Country: United Kingdom
- Language: English
- Box office: $7.2 million

Allelujah is a 2022 British drama film directed by Richard Eyre and written by Heidi Thomas. It is based on Alan Bennett's play of the same name. The film stars Jennifer Saunders, Bally Gill, Russell Tovey, David Bradley, Derek Jacobi, and Judi Dench.

Allelujah had its world premiere at the 2022 Toronto International Film Festival on 11 September 2022 and was released in the United Kingdom on 17 March 2023 by Warner Bros. Pictures.

== Plot ==
The Bethlehem hospital, nicknamed "the Beth" by locals, staff and residents, is a small geriatric hospital in Wakefield, West Yorkshire, that is threatened with closure due to NHS funding cuts. Among the staff who work there are a doctor known simply as Dr. Valentine, and the head nurse Sister Alma Gilpin, who is to be honoured for her service to the Beth with a concert and a medal presentation.

A film crew from a local television programme, Pennine People, is invited to the Beth to document a volunteer-led campaign to save it from closure. They interview staff, residents, and the chairman of the board. At the same time, Colin Colman, a consultant to the Health Secretary, arrives to visit his father Joe and assess the hospital, having previously recommended its closure. One of the residents, Mary Moss, is discouraged from being interviewed on-camera by the television crew, but Valentine gives her an iPad and encourages her to document her day-to-day experiences.

A frail incontinent woman named Mrs. Maudsley is admitted to the Beth and initially looked after by Valentine, but tended to by Alma the following night. She is found dead the next morning, and the Beth is threatened with legal action by her daughter and son-in-law, who were due to inherit her home only three months later. During this time, the Beth takes on a work experience student, Andy, and Colin reconnects with his estranged father, the two contemplating Joe's attempts to politically indoctrinate his son. Realising the Beth's importance to not only his father but also the local community, Colin returns to London and passionately defends it in a meeting, storming out after his pleas are ignored by the others present.

That night, Andy fails to act in enough time to prevent Joe from soiling himself in his bed. He is tended to by Alma, who makes a reference to his being on "the list". Afraid of what this might mean, Joe calls Colin and confides this fear in him. The next morning, Andy arrives at the Beth with a pack of cigarettes that Joe had requested he get, but finds Joe dead in his bed. The ceremony to honour Alma is due to occur that day; before it starts, Mary takes Valentine to one side and shows him a video she took of Alma tending to Mrs. Maudsley. Valentine deduces that Alma has been poisoning the most frail residents by lacing their night-time cups of warm milk with morphine. He alerts the chairman of the Board to this during the ceremony. Alma is jailed for life, and the Beth is closed, with its residents being moved to various other facilities.

In an epilogue, Valentine is shown working in an intensive care unit at the start of the COVID-19 pandemic, where he encounters Ambrose, one of the Beth's former residents, who dies holding his hand. An exhausted, enraged Valentine leaves the hospital and breaks the fourth wall with an impassioned monologue in defence of the NHS.

== Cast ==
- Jennifer Saunders as Sister Alma Gilpin, the head nurse at the Bethlehem Hospital
- Bally Gill as Dr Valinder Singh ‘Valentine’ Vashisht, the resident doctor at the Beth
- Judi Dench as Mary Moss, a former librarian who is a patient at the Beth
- Russell Tovey as Colin Colman, a management consultant to the Health Secretary, whose father is a patient at the Beth
- David Bradley as Joe Colman, a former miner who is a patient at the Beth, and is Colin’s father
- Derek Jacobi as Ambrose Hammersley, a former schoolmaster, who taught languages, and is now a patient at the Beth
- Jesse Akele as Nurse Pinkney, a cheerful nurse who works at the Beth
- Louis Ashbourne Serkis as Andy, a student doing a work placement at the Beth
- Julia McKenzie as Mrs Blanche Alice Maudsley, a new patient at the Beth who is suffering from dementia
- Lorraine Ashbourne as Mrs Earnshaw, Mrs Maudsley’s daughter
- Gerard Horan as Mr Earnshaw, Mrs Maudsley’s son-in-law
- Vincent Franklin as Mr Salter, the Chairman of the Board of the Beth

Other patients at the Bethlehem Hospital include Marjorie Yates as Hazel, who repeatedly attempts to seduce Ambrose; Marlene Sidaway as Lucille, a baker's daughter and former housewife; Jeffery Kissoon as Neville, a somewhat ornery patient of Caribbean heritage; Eileen Davies as Molly, who is unable to speak and instead communicates by banging on a serving tray; and Patricia England (reprising the role she originated in the stage production) as Mavis, a patient with a colourful past.

Arian Nik and JP Conway play Abdul and Kieran, the reporters from the local television programme Pennine People, while Paul Butterworth and Amanda Root play Richard and Cynthia, the volunteers representing the Friends of the Beth who attempt to save the hospital. Ross Tomlinson appears as Gerald, the physiotherapist, nicknamed 'Gorgeous Gerald', who leads the music therapy.

== Production ==
In October 2021, it was announced that Judi Dench, Derek Jacobi, Jennifer Saunders, Bally Gill, Russell Tovey, and David Bradley had joined the cast. Principal photography began later that month.

== Release ==
Allelujah had its world premiere at the 2022 Toronto International Film Festival. The film was released on 17 March 2023 by Pathé in France and Switzerland, and in the United Kingdom by Warner Bros. Pictures.

== Critical reception ==
The film has received a polarised response from critics. On the review aggregator website Rotten Tomatoes, 39% of 31 critics' reviews are positive, with an average rating of 5.4/10.
