= Derek Jacobi =

English actor (born 1938)

Sir Derek Jacobi CBE
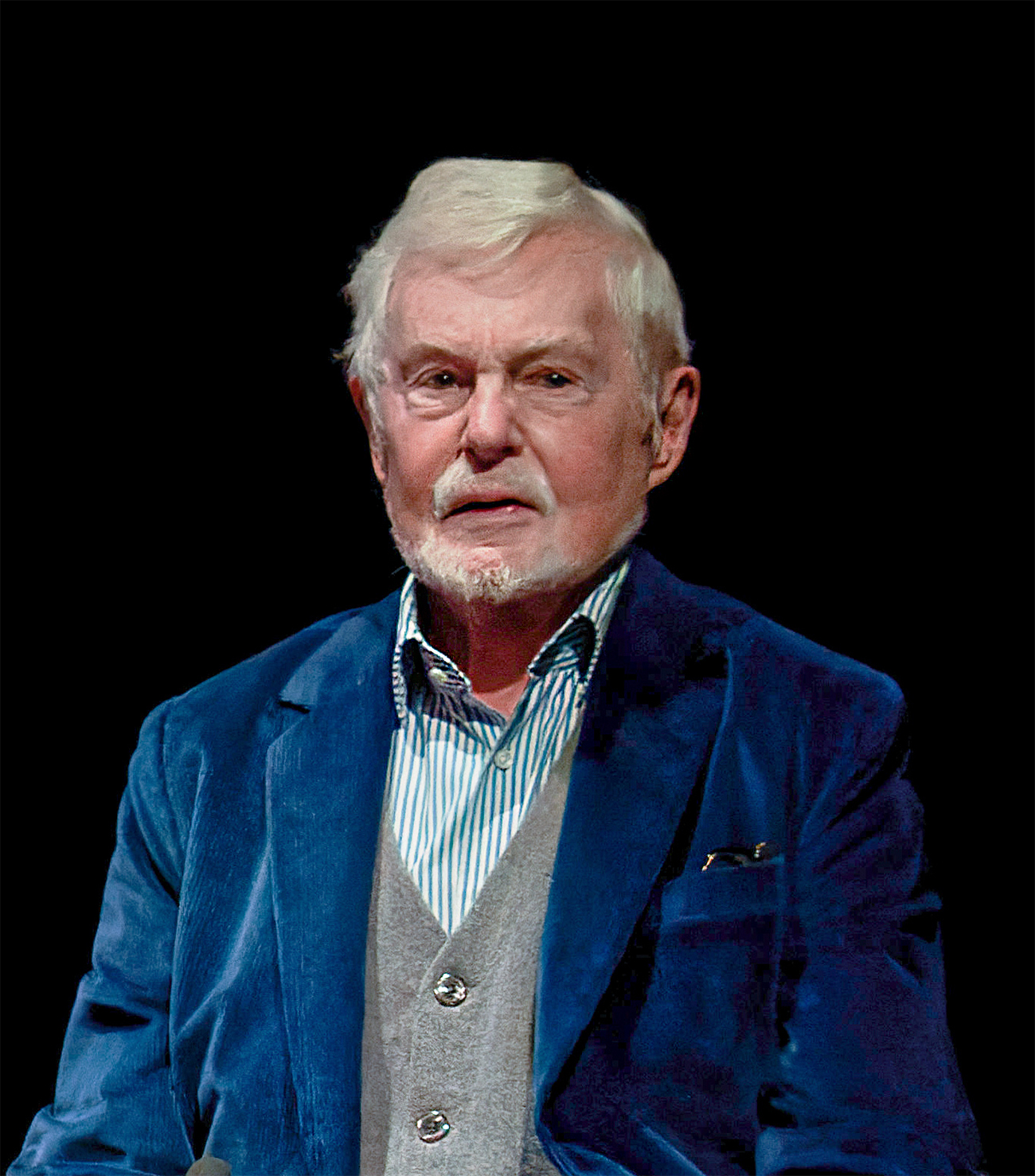
- Jacobi in 2022
- Born: Derek George Jacobi; 22 October 1938 (age 88); Leytonstone, Essex, England
- Education: St John's College, Cambridge
- Occupation: Actor
- Years active: 1959–present
- Works: Full list
- Partner: Richard Clifford (1979–present)
- Awards: Full list
- Derek Jacobi's voice recorded 2012, as part of an audio description of the Old Vic Theatre for VocalEyes

Sir Derek George Jacobi (/ˈdʒækəbi/ JAK-ə-bee; born 22 October 1938) is an English actor. Known for his roles on stage and screen as well as for his work at the Royal National Theatre, he has received numerous accolades including a Tony Award, a British Academy Television Award, two Laurence Olivier Awards, and two Primetime Emmy Awards. He was given a knighthood for his services to theatre by Queen Elizabeth II in 1994.

Jacobi started his professional acting career with Laurence Olivier as one of the founding members of the National Theatre. He has appeared in numerous Shakespearean stage productions including Hamlet, Much Ado About Nothing, Macbeth, Twelfth Night, The Tempest, King Lear, and Romeo and Juliet. Jacobi received the Laurence Olivier Award, for the title role in Cyrano de Bergerac in 1983 and Malvolio in Twelfth Night in 2009. He also won the Tony Award for Best Actor in a Play for his role as Benedick in Much Ado About Nothing in 1985.

On television, Jacobi portrayed Claudius in the BBC series I, Claudius (1976), for which he won the British Academy Television Award for Best Actor. He received two Primetime Emmy Awards for Outstanding Supporting Actor in a Miniseries or Movie for The Tenth Man (1988), and Outstanding Guest Actor in a Comedy Series for Frasier (2001). He also took roles in BBC Two's The Pallisers (1974), the ITV drama series Cadfael (1994–1998), the HBO film The Gathering Storm (2002), the sitcom Vicious (2013–2016), in BBC's Last Tango in Halifax (2012–2020), and the Netflix series The Crown in 2019.

Jacobi has acted in numerous films including Othello (1965), The Day of the Jackal (1973), Henry V (1989), Dead Again (1991), Hamlet (1996), Nanny McPhee (2005), The Riddle (2007), My Week with Marilyn (2011), Anonymous (2011), Cinderella (2015), and Murder on the Orient Express (2017). Jacobi portrayed Senator Gracchus in Ridley Scott's Gladiator (2000) and Gladiator II (2024). Jacobi has also earned two Screen Actors Guild Awards along with the ensemble cast for Robert Altman's Gosford Park (2001), and Tom Hooper's The King's Speech (2010).

== Early life and education ==
Derek George Jacobi was born on 22 October 1938 in Leytonstone, Essex, England (now part of East London), the only child of Alfred George Jacobi, who ran a tobacconists-cum-sweet shop in Chingford, and Daisy Gertrude (née Masters), a secretary. His patrilineal great-grandfather had emigrated from Germany to England during the 19th century. He also has a distant Huguenot ancestor. His family was working-class, and Jacobi describes his childhood as happy. When he was nine he contracted rheumatic fever and had to spend 18 months in bed. His parents moved his bed into the living room, where he spent his time listening to the radio and watching TV. This influence gave him a new accent and a desire to be an actor.

In his teens he went to Leyton County High School for Boys, now known as the Leyton Sixth Form College, and became an integral part of the drama club, The Players of Leyton. While in the sixth form, he starred in a production of Hamlet which was taken to the Edinburgh Festival Fringe and very well regarded. At 18, he won a scholarship to the University of Cambridge, graduating with a degree in history from St John's College. His university contemporaries included Ian McKellen who had a crush on him—"a passion that was undeclared and unrequited", as McKellen relates it — and Trevor Nunn. During his studies at Cambridge, Jacobi played many parts including Hamlet, which was taken on a tour to Switzerland, where he met Richard Burton. As a result of his performance of Edward II at Cambridge, Jacobi was invited to become a member of the Birmingham Repertory Theatre immediately after his graduation in 1960.

== Career ==
=== 1959–1979: Stage debut and breakthrough ===
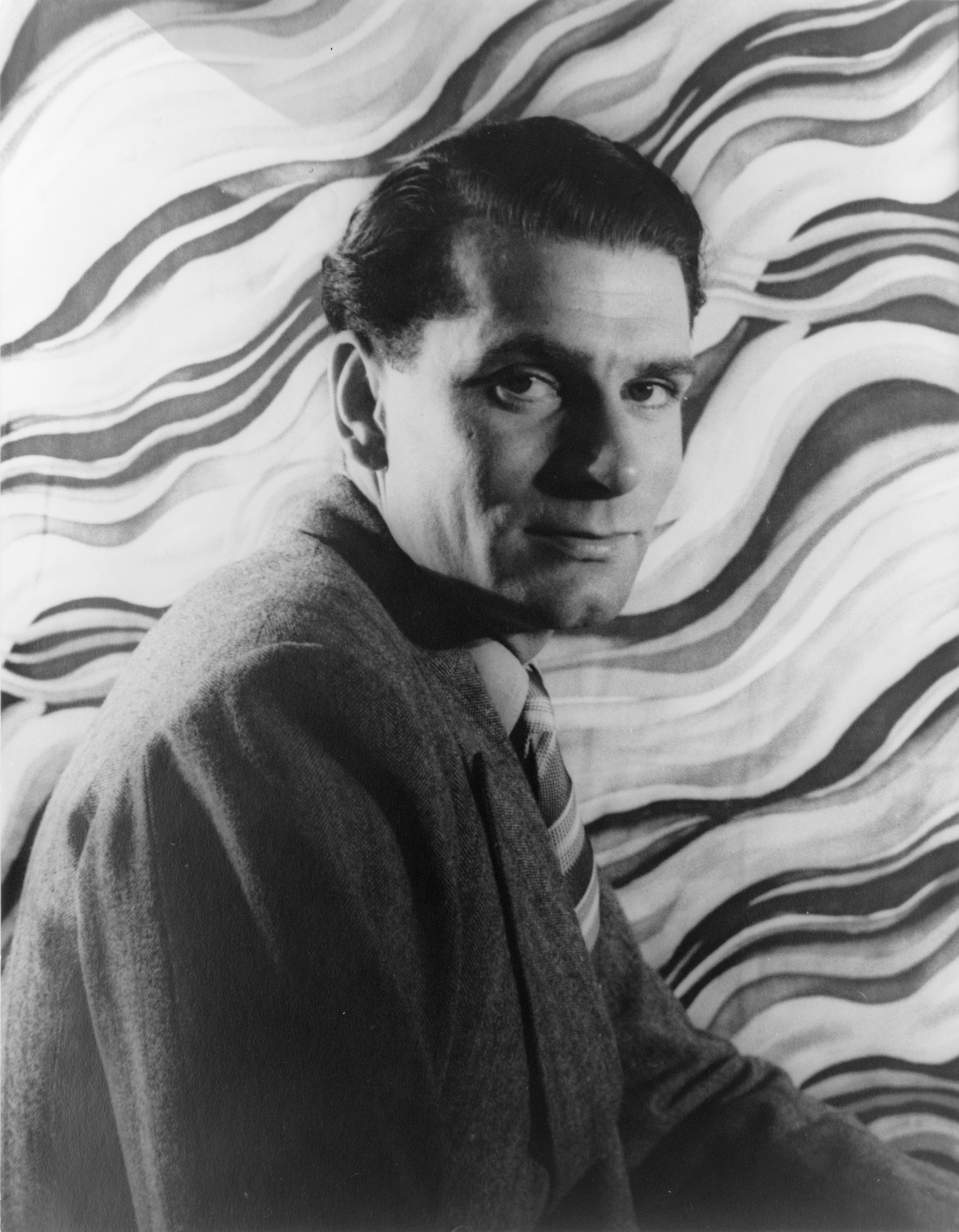
Laurence Olivier discovered Derek Jacobi, inviting him to join the Royal National Theatre.

Jacobi's talent was recognised by Laurence Olivier, who invited the young actor back to London to become one of the founding members of the new National Theatre, even though Jacobi was relatively unknown at the time. He played Laertes in the National Theatre's inaugural production of Hamlet opposite Peter O'Toole in 1963. Olivier cast him as Cassio in the successful National Theatre stage production of Othello, a role that Jacobi repeated in the 1965 film version. He played Andrei in the NT production and film of Three Sisters (1970), both featuring Olivier. On 27 July 1965, Jacobi played Brindsley Miller in the first production of Peter Shaffer's Black Comedy which was presented by the National Theatre at Chichester and subsequently in London.

After eight years at the National Theatre, Jacobi left in 1971 to pursue different roles. In 1972, he starred in the BBC series Man of Straw, an adaptation of Heinrich Mann's book Der Untertan, directed by Herbert Wise. Jacobi appeared in a somewhat tragicomic role, as Lord Fawn, in eight episodes of the 26-episode mini-series The Pallisers for BBC Two in 1974. Most of his theatrical work in the 1970s was with the touring classical Prospect Theatre Company, with which he undertook many roles, including Ivanov, Pericles, Prince of Tyre and A Month in the Country opposite Dorothy Tutin (1976).

Jacobi's big breakthrough came in 1976 when he played the title role in the BBC's series I, Claudius in which his performance as the stammering, twitching Emperor Claudius, won much praise and cemented his reputation. In 1979, thanks to his international popularity, he took Hamlet on a theatrical world tour through England, Egypt, Greece, Sweden, Australia, Japan and China, playing Prince Hamlet. He was invited to perform the role at Kronborg Castle, Denmark, known as Elsinore Castle, the setting of the play. In 1978, he appeared in the BBC Television Shakespeare production of Richard II, with Sir John Gielgud and Dame Wendy Hiller.

=== 1980–1999: Established career ===
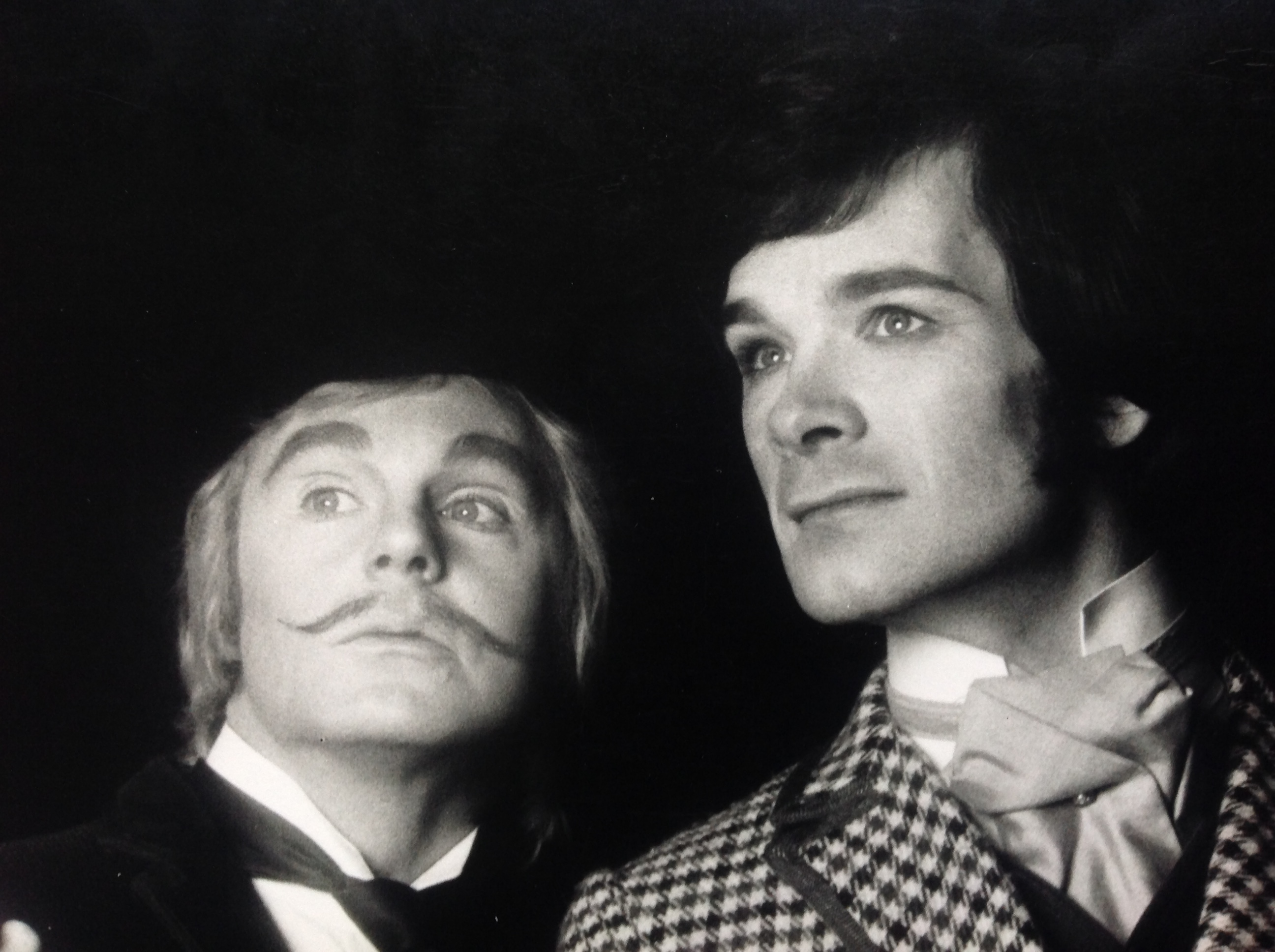
Jacobi with Frank Barrie performing The Merchant of Venice in 1971

In 1980, Jacobi took the leading role in the BBC's Hamlet, made his Broadway debut in The Suicide (a run shortened by Jacobi's return to England due to the death of his mother), and joined the Royal Shakespeare Company (RSC). From 1982 to 1985, he played four demanding roles simultaneously: Benedick in Shakespeare's Much Ado About Nothing, for which he won a Tony for its Broadway run (1984–1985); Prospero in The Tempest; Peer Gynt; and Cyrano de Bergerac which he brought to the US and played in repertory with Much Ado About Nothing on Broadway and in Washington DC (1984–1985). In 1986, he made his West End debut in Breaking the Code by Hugh Whitemore, starring in the role of Alan Turing, which was written with Jacobi specifically in mind. The play was taken to Broadway. In 1988, Jacobi alternated in West End the title roles of Shakespeare's Richard II and Richard III in repertoire.

He appeared in the television dramas Inside the Third Reich (1982), where he played Hitler; Mr Pye (1985); Little Dorrit (1987), based on Charles Dickens's novel; and The Tenth Man (1988) with Anthony Hopkins and Kristin Scott Thomas. In 1982, he voiced Nicodemus in the animated film The Secret of NIMH. In 1990, he starred as Daedalus in episode 4 of Jim Henson's The Storyteller: Greek Myths. Jacobi continued to play Shakespeare roles, notably in Kenneth Branagh's 1989 film of Henry V (as the Chorus), and made his directing debut as Branagh's director for the 1988 Renaissance Theatre Company's touring production of Hamlet, which also played at Elsinore and as part of a Renaissance repertory season at the Phoenix Theatre in London. The 1990s saw Jacobi keeping on with repertoire stage work in Kean at The Old Vic, Becket in the West End (the Haymarket Theatre) and Macbeth at the RSC in both London and Stratford. In 1994 Jacobi voiced Mr Jeremy Fisher in The World of Peter Rabbit and Friends.

He was appointed the joint artistic director of the Chichester Festival Theatre, with the West End impresario Duncan Weldon in 1995 for a three-year tenure. As an actor at Chichester he also starred in four plays, including his first Uncle Vanya in 1996 (he played it again in 2000, bringing the Chekhov play to Broadway for a limited run). Jacobi's work during the 1990s included the 13-episode series TV adaptation of the novels by Ellis Peters, Cadfael (1994–1998) and a televised version of Breaking the Code (1996). Film appearances of the era included performances in Kenneth Branagh's Dead Again (1991), Branagh's full-text rendition of Hamlet (1996) as King Claudius, John Maybury's Love is the Devil (1998), a portrait of painter Francis Bacon, as Senator Gracchus in Gladiator (2000) with Russell Crowe, and as "The Duke" opposite Christopher Eccleston and Eddie Izzard in a post-apocalyptic version of Thomas Middleton's The Revenger's Tragedy (2002).

=== 2000–present ===
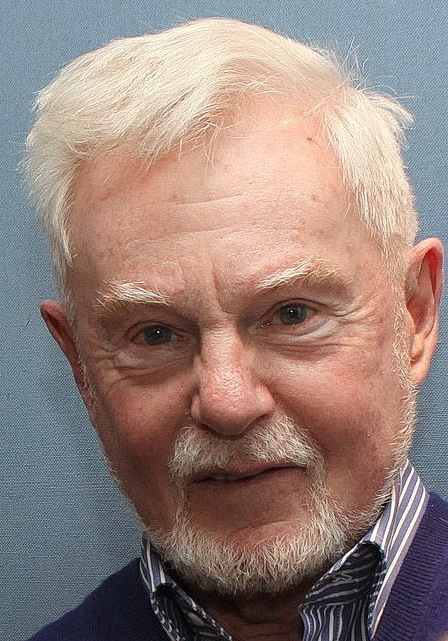
Jacobi in 2013

Jacobi has narrated audio book versions of the Iliad, The Voyage of the Dawn Treader by C. S. Lewis, Farmer Giles of Ham by J. R. R. Tolkien, and two abridged versions of I, Claudius by Robert Graves. In 2001, he provided the voice of "Duke Theseus" in The Children's Midsummer Night's Dream film. At the 53rd Primetime Emmy Awards, Jacobi won an Primetime Emmy Award for Outstanding Guest Actor in a Comedy Series by mocking his Shakespearean background in the television sitcom Frasier episode "The Show Must Go Off", in which he played the hammy, loud, untalented Jackson Hedley, a television star with a misguided belief that he deserves a revival of his stage career. In 2002, Jacobi toured Australia in The Hollow Crown with Sir Donald Sinden, Ian Richardson and Dame Diana Rigg. Jacobi also played the role of Senator Gracchus in Gladiator and starred in the 2002 miniseries The Jury. He is also the narrator for the BBC children's series In the Night Garden....

In 2003, Jacobi was involved with Scream of the Shalka, a webcast based on the science fiction series Doctor Who. He played the voice of the Doctor's nemesis the Master alongside Richard E. Grant as the Doctor. In the same year, he also appeared in Deadline, an audio drama also based on Doctor Who. Therein he played Martin Bannister, an ageing writer who makes up stories about "the Doctor", a character who travels in time and space, the premise being that the series had never made it on to television. Jacobi later followed this up with an appearance in the Doctor Who episode "Utopia" (June 2007); he appears as the kindly Professor Yana, who by the end of the episode is revealed to be the Master. Jacobi admitted to Doctor Who Confidential he had always wanted to be on the show: "One of my ambitions since the '60s has been to take part in a Doctor Who. The other one is Coronation Street. So I've cracked Doctor Who now. I'm still waiting for Corrie."

In 2004, Jacobi starred in Friedrich Schiller's Don Carlos at the Crucible Theatre in Sheffield, in an acclaimed production, which transferred to the Gielgud Theatre in London in January 2005. The London production of Don Carlos gathered rave reviews. Also in 2004, he starred as Lord Teddy Thursby in the first of the four-part BBC series The Long Firm, based on Jake Arnott's novel of the same name. In Nanny McPhee (2005), he played the role of the colourful Mr. Wheen, an undertaker. He played the role of Alexander Corvinus in the 2006 action-horror film Underworld: Evolution.

In March 2006, BBC Two broadcast Pinochet in Suburbia, a docudrama about former Chilean dictator Augusto Pinochet and the attempts to extradite him from Great Britain; Jacobi played the leading role. In September 2007, it was released in the US, retitled Pinochet's Last Stand. In 2006, he appeared in the children's movie Mist, the tale of a sheepdog puppy, he also narrated this movie. In July–August 2006, he played the eponymous role in A Voyage Round My Father at the Donmar Warehouse, a production which then transferred to the West End.

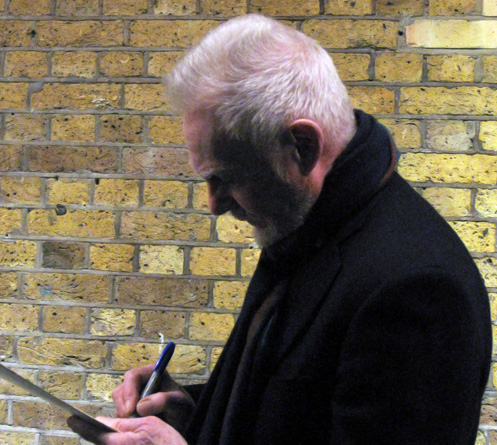
Jacobi signing autographs after his performance in Twelfth Night, London, 2009

In February 2007, The Riddle, directed by Brendan Foley and starring Jacobi, Vinnie Jones, and Vanessa Redgrave, was screened at Berlin EFM. Jacobi plays twin roles: first a present-day London tramp and then the ghost of Charles Dickens. In March 2007, the BBC's children's programme In the Night Garden... started its run of one hundred episodes, with Jacobi as the narrator. He played Nell's grandfather in ITV's Christmas 2007 adaptation of The Old Curiosity Shop, and returned to the stage to play Malvolio in Shakespeare's Twelfth Night (2009) for the Donmar Warehouse at Wyndham's Theatre in London. The role won him the Laurence Olivier Award for Best Actor. He appears in five 2009 films: Morris: A Life with Bells On, Hippie Hippie Shake, Endgame, Adam Resurrected and Charles Dickens's England. In 2010, he returned to I, Claudius, as Augustus in a radio adaptation. In 2011, he was part of a medieval epic, Ironclad, which also starred James Purefoy and Paul Giamatti, as the ineffectual Reginald de Cornhill, castellan of Rochester castle.

Jacobi starred in Michael Grandage's production of King Lear (London, 2010), giving what The New Yorker called "one of the finest performances of his distinguished career". In May 2011, he reprised this role at the Brooklyn Academy of Music.

In 2012, he appeared in Titanic: Blood and Steel and in November 2012, he starred in the BBC series Last Tango in Halifax. In 2013, he starred in the second series of Last Tango, and in 2014, the third series. In 2013, Jacobi starred alongside Ian McKellen in the ITV sitcom Vicious as Stuart Bixby, the partner to Freddie Thornhill, played by McKellen. On 23 August 2013, the show was renewed for a six-episode second series which began airing in June 2015. The show ended in December 2016, with a Christmas special. In 2015, Jacobi appeared as the King in Disney’s live-action version of “Cinderella".

Since 2017, Jacobi has again portrayed The Master in several box set series for Big Finish Productions, collectively entitled The War Master. In 2018, he played the Bishop of Digne in the BBC miniseries Les Misérables. In 2018, Jacobi received the World United Creator – Platinum Demiurge Award for his tremendous contribution to uniting and promoting world literature based on his efforts to introduce William Shakespeare into modern cinema. In 2019, he reprised the role of the emperor Claudius in Horrible Histories: The Movie – Rotten Romans. In 2022, Jacobi appeared in Allelujah, a film adaptation of Alan Bennett's play of the same name directed by Richard Eyre, which also starred Jennifer Saunders, Bally Gill, Russell Tovey, David Bradley, and Judi Dench.

In 2023, Jacobi appeared in The Martini Shot, a drama film written and directed by Stephen Wallis, which premiered at the Galway Film Fleadh in Ireland. The film also starred Matthew Modine, Stuart Townsend, Fiona Glascott, and John Cleese.

== Personal life ==
Jacobi is agnostic. When he was 21 he told his mother he was gay. She said she already knew, and was of the view that it was just a phase he was going through. In 2013 HarperCollins published Jacobi's memoir, As Luck Would Have It.

=== Civil partnership and marriage ===
In March 2006, four months after civil partnerships were introduced in the United Kingdom, Jacobi registered his partnership with Richard Clifford, a theatre director, with whom he has been in a relationship since the late 1970s. They finally married on his 80th birthday. The couple live in West Hampstead, northwest London.

=== Community ===
Along with his Vicious co-star Ian McKellen, he was a Grand Marshal of the 46th New York City Gay Pride March in 2015.

=== Interests ===
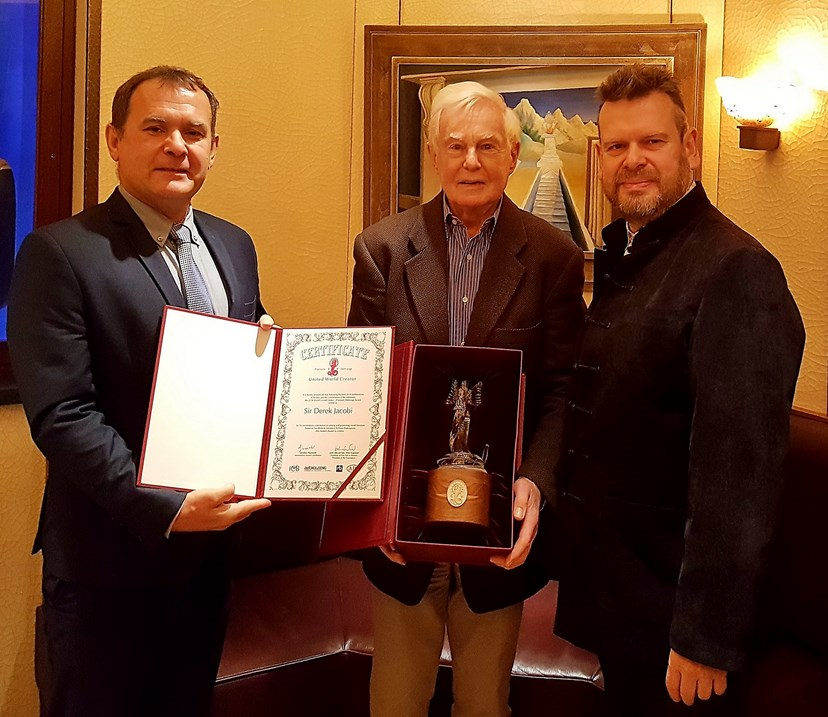
Roman Poslednik, Derek Jacobi, and Jarosław Pijarowski with Jacobi's World United Creator Award for his contribution to uniting and promoting world literature, based on his efforts to introduce William Shakespeare into modern cinema. London, 2018.

Jacobi has been publicly involved in the Shakespeare authorship question. He supports the Oxfordian theory of Shakespeare authorship, according to which Edward de Vere, 17th Earl of Oxford wrote the works of Shakespeare. Jacobi has given an address to the Shakespeare Authorship Research Centre promoting de Vere as the Shakespeare author and wrote forewords to two books on the subject in 2004 and 2005.

In 2007, Jacobi and fellow Shakespearean actor and director Mark Rylance initiated a "Declaration of Reasonable Doubt" on the authorship of Shakespeare's work, to encourage new research into the question. In 2011, Jacobi accepted a role in the film Anonymous, about the Oxfordian theory, starring Rhys Ifans and Vanessa Redgrave. In the film Jacobi narrates the Prologue and Epilogue, set in modern-day New York, while the film proper is set in Elizabethan England. Jacobi said that making the film was "a very risky thing to do", stating "the orthodox Stratfordians are going to be apoplectic with rage".

== Acting credits and accolades ==
Jacobi has received various awards including two Olivier Awards, a Tony, a BAFTA, two Primetime Emmy Awards and two Screen Actors Guild Awards.

- 1985 Birthday Honours: Commander of the Order of the British Empire (CBE) – United Kingdom
- 1989: Knight 1st class of the Order of the Dannebrog – Denmark
- 1994 New Year Honours: Knight Bachelor, for services to Drama – United Kingdom

== See also ==
- List of British actors
- List of Oxfordian theory supporters
- List of Primetime Emmy Award winners
