= David Bradley (English actor) =

English actor (born 1942)

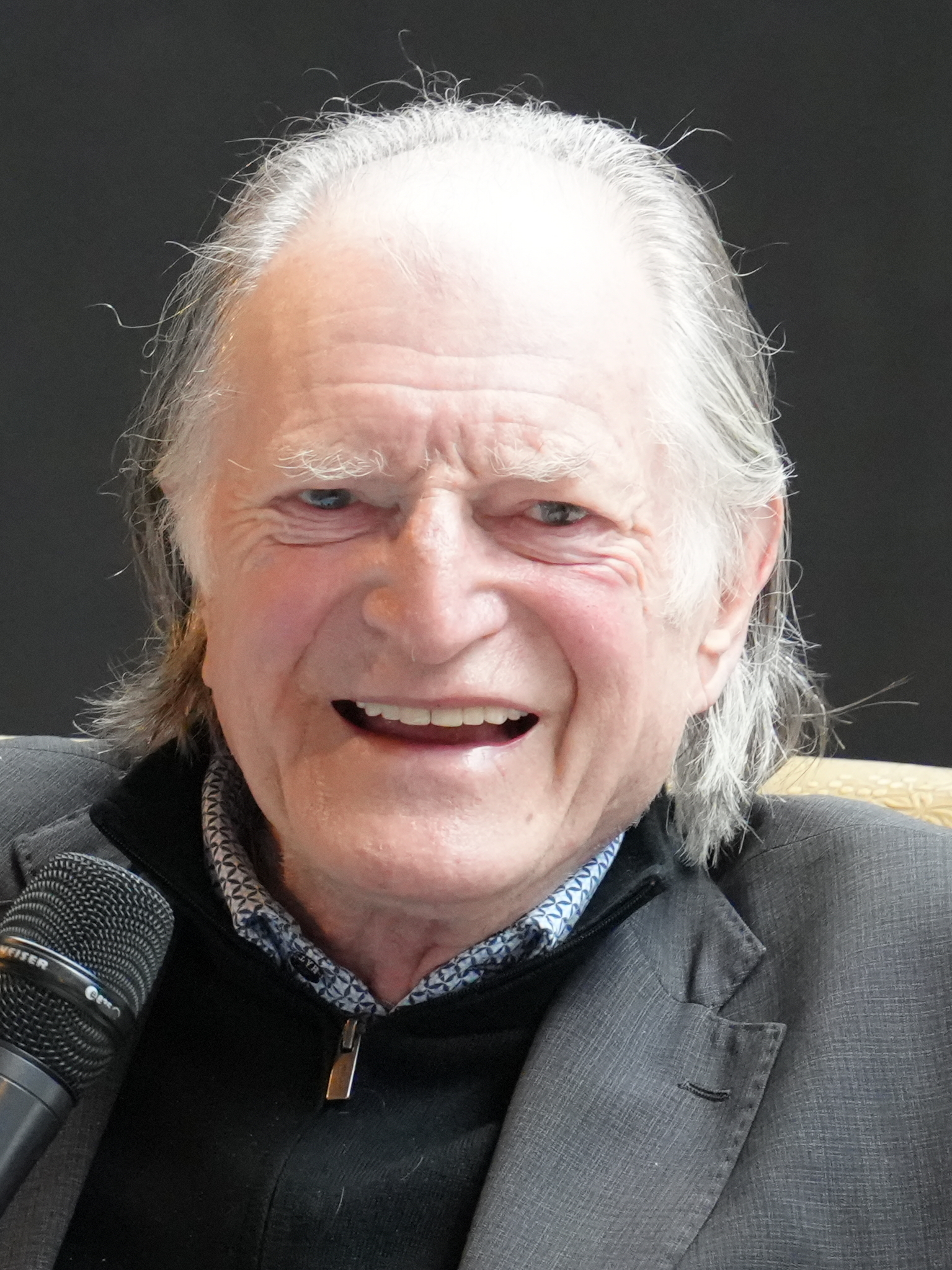
- Bradley in 2025
- Born: 17 April 1942 (age 84); York, England
- Education: Royal Academy of Dramatic Art (RADA)
- Occupation: Actor
- Years active: 1971–present
- Spouse: Rosanna Bradley (m. 1978)
- Children: 3

David Bradley (born 17 April 1942) is an English actor. He is best known for his screen roles, which include Argus Filch in the Harry Potter film series, Walder Frey in the HBO fantasy series Game of Thrones and Abraham Setrakian in the FX horror series The Strain.

A character actor, Bradley has notably acted in Our Friends in the North, the Three Flavours Cornetto trilogy and After Life. For Broadchurch, Bradley won the 2014 British Academy Television Award for Best Supporting Actor. He has made several appearances as the First Doctor in Doctor Who, having portrayed the role's originator, William Hartnell, in the TV biopic An Adventure in Space and Time. In 2021, he received an Annie Award for Best Voice Actor in a Television Series for his work as Merlin in Guillermo del Toro's animated Netflix series Tales of Arcadia.

An alumnus of the Royal Shakespeare Company, Bradley is also an established stage actor, with a career that includes a Laurence Olivier Award for his role in a production of King Lear and appearing in the Harold Pinter play No Man's Land at the Duke of York's Theatre in the West End.

== Early life and education ==
David Bradley was born on 17 April 1942 in York, where he attended the Catholic St George's Secondary Modern School, now All Saints Catholic School, and was a member of its choir. He first performed on stage in musical productions, as a member of a youth club and with the Rowntree Youth Theatre.

Upon leaving school, he completed a five-year apprenticeship with the optical instruments maker Cooke, Troughton & Simms and remained with the firm until 1966, when he moved to London to train as an actor at the Royal Academy of Dramatic Art.

== Career ==
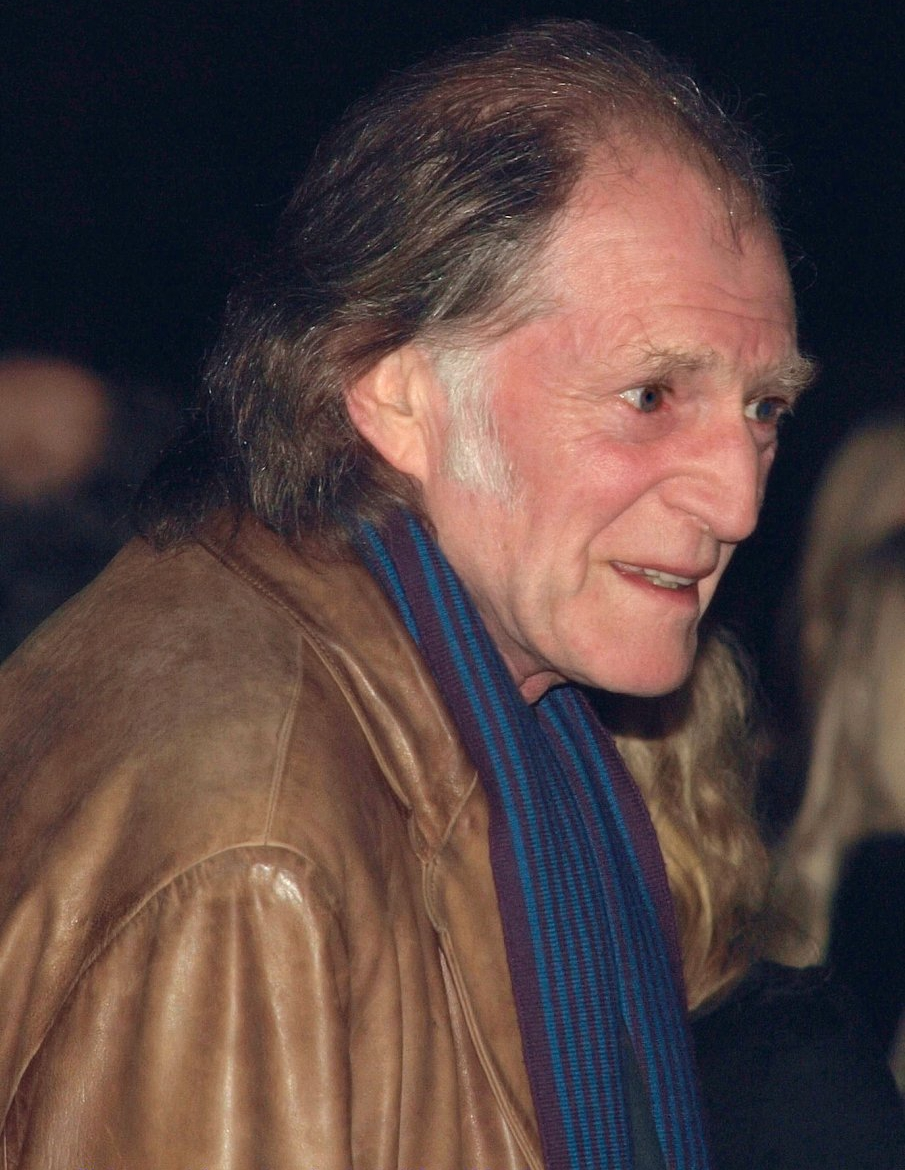
Bradley at the Harry Brown premiere in 2009

Bradley joined the Royal Shakespeare Company and performed at Laurence Olivier's National Theatre Company in the early 1970s. He first appeared on television in 1971, as a police officer in the comedy Nearest and Dearest. He was awarded a Laurence Olivier Award in 1991 for his supporting role as the Fool in King Lear at the Royal National Theatre. He appeared in the Royal National Theatre's 1997 production of The Homecoming, as well as productions of The Caretaker at Sheffield Theatres and the Tricycle Theatre from 2006 to 2007. In 2005 he played the title role in Nicholas Hytner's production of Henry IV Parts One and Two at the Olivier Theatre, London.

Bradley played fictional Labour Member of Parliament Eddie Wells in the 1996 BBC Two serial Our Friends in the North. Also in 1996, he appeared as gangster Alf Black in Band of Gold. In 1998, he appeared in the BBC adaptation of Vanity Fair as the miserly Sir Pitt Crawley, and Our Mutual Friend as the villainous Rogue Riderhood. Other television appearances include the 2001 series The Way We Live Now, directed by David Yates, who would work with Bradley five years later on the Harry Potter films.

From 2002 to 2004, Bradley starred as Jake in the BBC comedy series Wild West. Bradley acted in the 2004 musical drama serial Blackpool on BBC One. He appeared in the 2005 BBC drama Mr. Harvey Lights a Candle, playing a morose coach-driver who takes an unruly party of pupils on a trip to Salisbury Cathedral, and the 2006 BBC drama Sweeney Todd. He had a small role in a 2006 episode of the series Taggart. In 2003, he played Tom in the Midsomer Murders episode "The Green Man". He appeared as the electrolarynx-using gangster Stemroach in the BBC comedy series Ideal and as Electric in the BBC's Thieves Like Us, as well as the BBC One series True Dare Kiss in 2007–08.

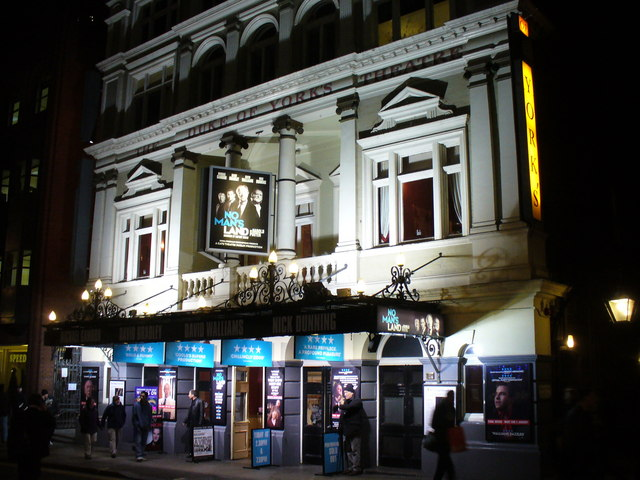
No Man's Land starring Bradley playing at the Duke of York's Theatre in London's West End in 2008

Bradley appeared in the 2002 film Nicholas Nickleby which was based on The Life and Adventures of Nicholas Nickleby by Charles Dickens, and had a small role in the 2007 comedy film Hot Fuzz as a farmer who illegally hoards weapons. He played Cohen the Barbarian in a Sky One adaptation of The Colour of Magic in 2008. That same year he appeared as Spooner in a production of Harold Pinter's No Man's Land at the Gate Theatre, Dublin, which later transferred to London's West End.

In 2009, Bradley appeared in Ashes to Ashes, playing an animal rights activist, and in The Street, both on BBC. Bradley portrayed Will Somers, Henry VIII's court fool, in an episode of the Showtime series The Tudors in 2009. In 2010, he appeared in the film Another Year, which earned him a nomination for Best Supporting Actor from the London Film Critics Circle Awards. From 2011 to 2017, Bradley appeared as the villainous Lord Walder Frey in the HBO series Game of Thrones.

Bradley played Solomon, a ruthless buccaneer, in the 2012 Doctor Who episode "Dinosaurs on a Spaceship". He previously provided voice work for The Sarah Jane Adventures serial Death of the Doctor. It was announced in January 2013, that Bradley had been cast as actor William Hartnell in An Adventure in Space and Time, a BBC docudrama about the creation of Doctor Who in 1963. The special aired in November 2013, adding to the buildup to the 50th anniversary episode of Doctor Who later that month. He also appeared in the first series of Broadchurch, for which he won the British Academy Television Award for Best Supporting Actor. In 2013, he also appeared in The World's End, a follow-up to Hot Fuzz in the Three Flavours Cornetto trilogy, this time portraying "Mad" Basil, an eccentric local man from the fictional English town Newton Haven.

From 2014, Bradley played a leading role as Professor Abraham Setrakian, a Holocaust survivor turned vampire hunter in Guillermo del Toro's TV series The Strain. In 2015, Bradley became a public supporter of Chapel Lane Theatre Company based in Stratford-Upon-Avon. In 2017, Bradley joined the cast of Guillermo del Toro's animated Netflix series Trollhunters: Tales of Arcadia playing the role of Merlin. In 2021, he received an Annie Award for Best Voice Actor in a Television Role for his role in the final chapter of the trilogy, Wizards: Tales of Arcadia as the wizard Merlin.

In 2017, in the final episode of the tenth series of Doctor Who, "The Doctor Falls", Bradley returned to portray the First Doctor, having previously portrayed Hartnell, who originally played the character. He reprised the role in the 2017 Christmas special, "Twice Upon a Time", in an audio series for Big Finish Productions titled Doctor Who: The First Doctor Adventures alongside his An Adventure in Space and Time cast, and in the immersive theatre show Doctor Who: Time Fracture. This makes him the third actor to play the role in the television programme, after William Hartnell and Richard Hurndall since the premiere of Doctor Who in 1963, and at the age of 75, he is the also the oldest actor to play the role of the Doctor on television. He again played the First Doctor in the final episode of the 2022 specials, "The Power of the Doctor".

From 2019 to 2022, Bradley played Ray Johnson, the demented father of Tony (Ricky Gervais) in the Netflix series After Life. In 2021, it was announced that Bradley would be joining the cast of Allelujah, a film adaptation of Alan Bennett's play of the same name directed by Richard Eyre, which will star Jennifer Saunders, Bally Gill, Russell Tovey, Derek Jacobi, and Judi Dench. In 2022, it was announced that Bradley would voice Fowler in Chicken Run: Dawn of the Nugget.

== Personal life ==
Bradley married his wife Rosanna in 1978. They have three children. His eldest son, George, is an architect, who has featured on the ITV series Love Your Home and Garden alongside Alan Titchmarsh. His daughter, Francesca, works in casting, having worked on Michael Bay's 6 Underground. He has said that it was his children who turned his attention to the Harry Potter film franchise and coached him for the role of Argus Filch.

Bradley is the president of Second Thoughts Drama Group, which performs in and around Stratford-upon-Avon. He has received honorary doctorates from the University of Warwick (17 July 2012) and York St John University (19 November 2015).

He is a fan of football clubs Aston Villa and York City. On 22 November 2014, he took part in a video paying tribute to Aston Villa on their 140th birthday.

== Filmography ==
Key
†	Denotes works that have not yet been released

=== Film ===
Year	Title	Role	Notes
1979	The Frisco Kid	Julius Rosensheine	
1987	Prick Up Your Ears	Undertaker	
1997	Seeing Things		Short
1998	Left Luggage	Concierge	
1999	Tom's Midnight Garden	Abel	
2000	The King Is Alive	Henry	
2001	Blow Dry	Noah	
2001	Gabriel & Me	Grandad	
2001	Harry Potter and the Philosopher's Stone	Argus Filch	
2002	This Is Not a Love Song	Mr. Bellamy	
2002	Crossings	Yorkshire Farmer	Short
2002	The Intended	The Priest	
2002	Harry Potter and the Chamber of Secrets	Argus Filch	
2002	Nicholas Nickleby	Nigel Bray	
2002	Pas de Trois	Porter	Short
2004	Harry Potter and the Prisoner of Azkaban	Argus Filch	
2004	Exorcist: The Beginning	Father Gionetti	
2005	Red Mercury	Neil Ashton	
2005	Harry Potter and the Goblet of Fire	Argus Filch	
2006	Lycanthropy	Club Owner	
2007	Hot Fuzz	Arthur Webley	
2007	Harry Potter and the Order of the Phoenix	Argus Filch	
2008	The Daisy Chain	Sean Cryan	
2008	I Know You Know	Mr. Fisher	
2009	Harry Potter and the Half-Blood Prince	Argus Filch	
2009	Harry Brown	Leonard Attwell	
2010	Another Year	Ronnie	
2011	Lucy and the Attack of the Malevolon	Narrator	Short, voice role
2011	Harry Potter and the Deathly Hallows – Part 2	Argus Filch	
2011	Captain America: The First Avenger	Church Keeper	
2011	The Holding	Cooper	
2013	The World's End	"Mad" Basil	
2016	The Young Messiah	Old Rabbi	
2016	Broadcast Signal Intrusion	James' Father	Short
2017	The Lodgers	Bermingham	
2017	Edmund the Magnificent	Farmer	Short
2018	Await Further Instructions	Grandad	
2020	Doctors Assemble	The First Doctor	Short, voice role
2021	Roy	Roy	Short
2021	Jolt	Gareth Fizel	
2021	Emily the Little Match Girl	Harry Smith	
2022	Allelujah	Joe Colman	
2022	Catherine Called Birdy	Lord Gideon Sidebottom	
2022	Guillermo del Toro's Pinocchio	Geppetto	Voice role
2022	Your Christmas or Mine?	Jack	
2023	Chicken Run: Dawn of the Nugget	Fowler	Voice role
2023	Your Christmas or Mine 2	Jack	
2023	Good Grief	Duncan	
2025	Frankenstein	Blind Man	

=== Television ===
Year	Title	Role	Notes
1971	Nearest and Dearest	2nd Policeman	Episode: "Barefaced in the Park"
1971	A Family at War	Colin Woodcock	Recurring role
1972	ITV Sunday Night Theatre	Parker Street Goalie	Episode: "Another Sunday and Sweet F.A"
1972	Thirty-Minute Theatre	The Evangelist	Episode: "That Quiet Earth"
1976	Bill Brand	Peter Malone	Episode: "August for the Party"
1978	The Professionals	Tony Kristo	Episode: "Close Quarters"
1980	Coronation Street	Detective Sergeant Simms	1 episode
1981	Play for Today	Communist speaker	Episode: "The Union"
1981	BBC2 Playhouse	Wike	Episode: "Clapperclaw"
1981	BBC2 Playhouse	Barman	Episode: "Findings on a Late Afternoon"
1982	Frost in May	Rambler	Episode: "The Lost Traveller"
1983	Tartuffe, or The Imposter	Cleante	TV film
1985	One by One	Mr. Fazakerly	Episode: "To Hear the Sea Maid's Music"
1985	Theatre Night	Charron	Episode: "Molière"
1986	King of the Ghetto	Ralph	Mini-series
1989	Shadow of the Noose	Edward Lawrence	Episode: "Gun in Hand"
1989	The Play on One	Harry	Episode: "A Master of the Marionettes"
1992	ScreenPlay	Mr. Preach	Episode: "Bad Girl"
1992	Between the Lines	Sergeant Harry Ross	Episode: "Lies and Damned Lies"
1993	Full Stretch	Don Naylor	Episode: "Deals on Wheels"
1993	The Buddha of Suburbia	Helen's Father	Mini-series
1994	Screen Two	Headmaster	Episode: "Criminal"
1994	Performance	Barnadine	Episode: "Measure for Measure"
1994	Martin Chuzzlewit	David Crimple	Mini-series
1995	The Vet	Dick Sims	Episode: "Relative Values"
1995	Casualty	Stanmore	Episode: "Hit and Run"
1996	A Touch of Frost	Les James	Episode: "Unknown Soldiers"
1996	Band of Gold	Alf	Episode: "Hustling"
1996	Our Friends in the North	Eddie Wells	Series regular
1996	Wycliffe	Joe Mawnan	Episode: "Total Loss"
1996	In Your Dreams	Tutor	TV film
1996	Cracker	Frank Carter	Episode: "White Ghost"
1996	Kiss and Tell	Superintendent Hines	TV film
1997	Reckless	Arnold Springer	Series regular
1997	Bramwell	Charles Matthews	1 episode
1997	The Moth	Dave Waters	TV film
1998	Our Mutual Friend	Rogue Riderhood	Mini-series
1998	Where the Heart Is	Derek Woodford	Episode: "She Goes On"
1998	Reckless: The Movie	Arnold Springer	TV film
1998	Vanity Fair	Sir Pitt Crawley	Mini-series
1998	The Canterbury Tales	January	Animated series, voice role
1999	Doomwatch: Winter Angel	Angel	TV film, voice role
2000	The Wilsons	Ray Wilson	Series regular
2000	Black Cab	Gerald	Episode: "Marriage Guidance"
2001	Shades	Alan Roberts	Mini-series
2001	Station Jim	Elliot	TV film
2001	Murphy's Law	Hatcher Snr.	TV film
2001	The Way We Live Now	Mr. Broune	Mini-series
2001	Sweet Dreams	Jim	TV film
2002–2004	Wild West	Old Jake Trethowan	Series regular
2003	The Mayor of Casterbridge	Councillor Vatt	TV film
2003	Midsomer Murders	Tom	Episode: "The Green Man"
2003	Charles II: The Power and the Passion	Sir Edmund Berry Godfrey	1 episode
2003	Blue Dove	Max Turnbull	Mini-series
2003	Murphy's Law	Hatcher Snr.	Episode: "Pilot"
2004	Blackpool	Hallworth	Mini-series
2005	Mr. Harvey Lights a Candle	Archie	TV film
2006	Sweeney Todd	Sweeney's Father	TV film
2006	Taggart	Elijah Buckland	Episode: "Law"
2006–2008	Ideal	Stemroach	Recurring role
2007	Thieves Like Us	Electric	Recurring role
2007	True Dare Kiss	Stanley Tyler	Recurring role
2008	The Colour of Magic	Cohen the Barbarian	Episode: "Part 2: The Light Fantastic"
2008	The Invisibles	'Knacker' Locke	Mini-series
2009	The Tudors	Will (Court Fool)	Episode: "Problems in the Reformation"
2009	Ashes to Ashes	Robin Elliot	1 episode
2009	The Street	Joe	Episode: "Meet the Parents"
2010	Arena	Various roles	Episode: "Harold Pinter: A Celebration"
2010	Five Daughters	Patrick Palmer	Mini-series
2010	New Tricks	Simon Beswick/John Plummer	Episode: "Dead Man Talking"
2010	The Sarah Jane Adventures	Shansheeth Blue	Episode: "Death of the Doctor"
2011	Waking the Dead	George Barlow	Episode: "Waterloo"
2011–2017	Game of Thrones	Walder Frey	Recurring role
2012	Doctor Who	Solomon	Episode: "Dinosaurs on a Spaceship"
2012	Eternal Law	Mack Steen	1 episode
2012	Benidorm	Stan Garvey	1 episode
2012	The Hollow Crown	Gardener	Episode: "Richard II"
2012	Bad Education	Ennis	Episode: "School Trip"
2012	World Without End	Brother Joseph	Recurring role
2012	Bad Sugar	Ralphfred Cauldwell	TV film
2012–2013	Prisoners' Wives	Frank	Recurring role
2012–2014	Mount Pleasant	Charlie	Series regular
2013	Broadchurch	Jack Marshall	Recurring role
2013	An Adventure in Space and Time	William Hartnell	TV film
2014	Silk	LJ Reynolds	1 episode
2014–2017	The Strain	Abraham Setrakian	Series regular
2016	Beowulf: Return to the Shieldlands	Gorrik	1 episode
2016	Medici	Alessandro de' Bardi	Episode: "The Dome and the Domicile"
2017, 2022	Doctor Who	First Doctor	3 episodes ("Twice Upon a Time" and "The Power of the Doctor"); cameo in "The Doctor Falls"
2017–2018	Trollhunters: Tales of Arcadia	Merlin	Series regular, voice role
2018	Hang Ups	Frank Ellerby	1 episode
2018–2019	Les Misérables	Gillenormand	Series regular
2018–2019	Britannia	Quane	Series regular
2019–2022	After Life	Ray Johnson	Series regular
2020	Gangs of London	Jim	1 episode
2020	Wizards: Tales of Arcadia	Merlin	Animated series, voice role
2020	Mandy	Frank	Episode: "Meat"
2021	Adventure Time: Distant Lands	Old Finn	Episode: "Together Again", voice role
2022	The Responder	Davey	2 episodes
2024	Coma	Harry	2 episodes

=== Music video ===
Year	Title	Artist
2020	"Youth and Love"	Jack Savoretti
2023	"Wish You the Best"	Lewis Capaldi

=== Attractions ===
Year	Title	Role	Notes
2021	Doctor Who: Time Fracture	First Doctor	Pre-recorded video
