= Richard Eyre =

English director

Sir Richard Eyre CH CBE FRSL
- Born: Richard Charles Hastings Eyre; 28 March 1943 (age 83); Barnstaple, Devon, England
- Education: Peterhouse, Cambridge
- Occupations: Director, playwright
- Spouse: Sue Birtwistle
- Awards: Full list

Sir Richard Charles Hastings Eyre CH CBE (born 28 March 1943) is an English film, theatre, television and opera director. Eyre has received numerous accolades including three Laurence Olivier Awards as well as nominations for six BAFTA Awards and two Tony Awards. He was appointed a Commander of the Order of the British Empire (CBE) in the 1992 News Year Honours, and knighted in the 1997 New Year Honours.

Eyre started his career as the associate director at the Royal Lyceum Theatre, Edinburgh from 1967 to 1972 before becoming the artistic director of the Royal National Theatre from 1987 to 1999. He has directed numerous West End productions earning three Laurence Olivier Awards for Best Director for Guys and Dolls (1982), King Lear (1998), and Hedda Gabler (2006). He was also Olivier-nominated for Racing Demon (1989), Skylight (1995), John Gabriel Borkman (1997), Vincent in Brixton (2003), Mary Poppins (2005), and Ghosts (2014). For his work on Broadway he received Tony Award for Best Director nominations for The Judas Kiss (1998) and The Crucible (2002).

He made his directorial film debut with The Ploughman's Lunch (1983). He went on to direct the dramas Iris (2001) and Notes on a Scandal (2005) earning nominations for the BAFTA Award for Outstanding British Film. For television he directed and produced numerous episodes of Play for Today (1979–1981). He also directed The Cherry Orchard (1981), Tumbledown (1988), The Dresser (2015), and King Lear (2018).

== Early life and education ==
Eyre was born in Barnstaple, Devon, England, the son of Richard Galfridus Hastings Giles Eyre and his wife, Minna Mary Jessica Royds.

He was educated at Sherborne School, an independent school for boys in the market town of Sherborne in northwest Dorset in southwest England, followed by Peterhouse at the University of Cambridge. Eyre became the first president of Rose Bruford College in July 2010. He gives "President's Lectures" at this drama school; his 2012 talk was entitled "Directing Shakespeare for BBC Television". He lives in Brook Green, West London.

== Career ==
=== 1967–1986: Early theatre work ===
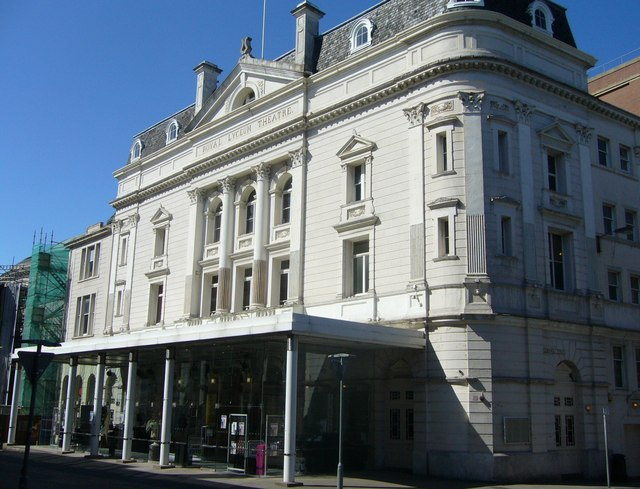
Eyre was the associate director at the Royal Lyceum Theatre from 1967 to 1972

Eyre was Associate Director at the Royal Lyceum Theatre, Edinburgh from 1967 to 1972. He won STV Awards for the Best Production in Scotland in 1969, 1970 and 1971. His productions at the Lyceum included Jack Ronder's adaptation of James Hogg's novel, Confessions of a Justified Sinner in August 1971. He was artistic director of Nottingham Playhouse from 1973–78 where he commissioned and directed many new plays, including the Trevor Griffiths play Comedians starring Jonathan Pryce, Stephen Rea, and Tom Wilkinson which was first performed in 1975.

Eyre worked as both a director and one of the producers of BBC's Play for Today between 1978 and 1980. He directed The Ploughman's Lunch (written by Ian McEwan) in 1983, which won the Evening Standard Award for Best Film. He returned to the BBC in 1988 to direct the Falklands War story Tumbledown (starring Colin Firth), which won him the BAFTA Award for Best Director and the Prix Italia. He has been the recipient of numerous directing awards including five Olivier Awards. In 1982 he won the Evening Standard Award for Best Director, for Guys and Dolls, and in 1997 for King Lear and Tom Stoppard's The Invention of Love. In 1997 he won an Olivier Lifetime Achievement Award, and awards from The Directors' Guild of Great Britain, the South Bank Show, the Evening Standard and the Critics' Circle.

=== 1987–1999: Royal National Theatre ===
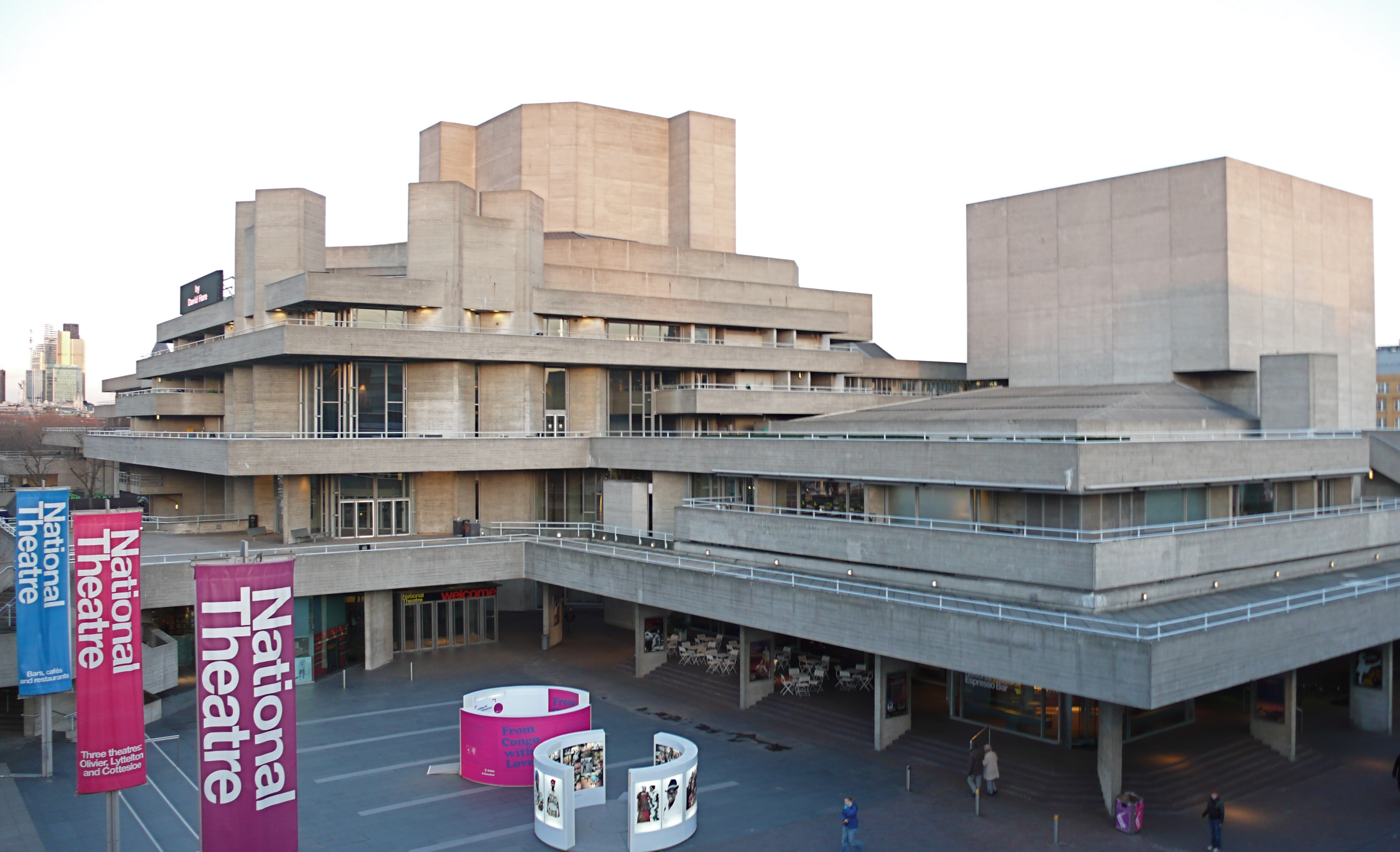
Eyre was the artistic director of the National Theatre from 1987 to 1997.

Eyre was artistic director of the UK's National Theatre (which gained the now little-used prefix Royal as outgoing director Peter Hall handed over to him) between 1987 and 1997. He had previously directed a well received revival of Guys and Dolls for the venue in 1982, with Olivier Award-winner Julia McKenzie and Bob Hoskins. He repeated this production in 1996 with Imelda Staunton and Joanna Riding. His diaries from his time at the National have been published as National Service, winning the 2003 Theatre Book Prize.

Other than Guys and Dolls, his theatre productions include Hamlet (twice), with Jonathan Pryce at the Royal Court in 1980 and Daniel Day-Lewis in 1989; Richard III with Ian McKellen; King Lear with Ian Holm; Tennessee Williams' The Night of the Iguana and Sweet Bird of Youth; Eduardo De Filippo's Napoli milionaria and La grande magia; Henrik Ibsen's John Gabriel Borkman with Paul Scofield, Vanessa Redgrave and Eileen Atkins; Ibsen's Hedda Gabler with Eve Best; and numerous new plays by David Hare, Tom Stoppard, Trevor Griffiths, Howard Brenton, Alan Bennett, Christopher Hampton and Nicholas Wright. He made his Broadway debut directing the David Hare play Racing Demon earning a Tony Award for Best Play nomination. The following year he directed the Broadway transfer of Hare's play Skylight (1996). He directed Hare's play The Judas Kiss (1998) starring Liam Neeson and Tom Hollander on the West End and Broadway. The next year he directed Judi Dench in Hare's play Amy's View at the Ethel Barrymore Theatre on Broadway which earned her the Tony Award for Best Actress in a Play.

Eyre has also directed operas. His debut was the 1994 production of La traviata at the Royal Opera House which starred Angela Gheorghiu and was conducted by Sir Georg Solti. This production was televised and has subsequently been released on video and DVD. Eyre was appointed to the Board of Governors of the BBC in November 1995, and in October 2000 was appointed for a second term of office, though he resigned early (with effect from 31 May 2003) due to theatre and film directing commitments. In 1999, Eyre gave the James MacTaggart Memorial Lecture at the Edinburgh TV Festival, where he argued public service broadcasting must give way to public interest broadcasting, predicting the imminent demise of public service television. Eyre has written adaptations of Hedda Gabler and of Sartre's Les mains sales (Dirty Hands) as The Novice for the Almeida Theatre. A friend of Ian Charleson, whom he directed in acclaimed performances of Guys and Dolls and Hamlet, Eyre contributed a chapter to the 1990 book, For Ian Charleson: A Tribute.

=== 2000–2009: Film director ===
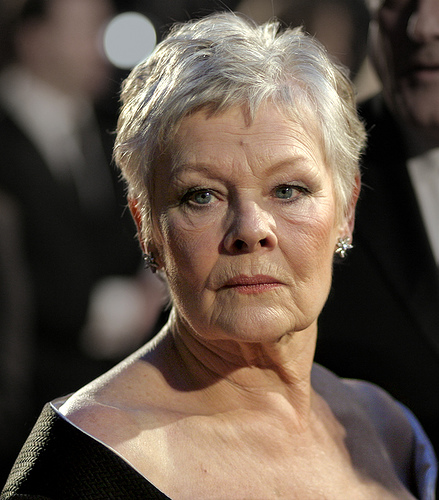
Eyre directed Judi Dench in the films Iris (2001), and Notes on a Scandal (2006) for which she earned nominations for the Academy Award for Best Actress

In 2001 he directed the biographical drama Iris about writer and philosopher Iris Murdoch. The film covers her early life to her later years dealing with Alzheimers. Critics praised the film specifically citing the powerful performances from its four stars Judi Dench, Jim Broadbent, Kate Winslet and Hugh Bonneville. Broadbent won the Academy Award for Best Supporting Actor for his performance in Iris, and Dench and Winslet were nominated for Best Actress and Best Supporting Actress, respectively. The following year he directed the Broadway revival of the Arthur Miller play The Crucible starring Liam Neeson and Laura Linney. Charles Isherwood of Variety wrote, "Eyre’s production has an earnest integrity to the text that firmly accentuates the play’s powerful aspects".

In 2006, he directed Notes on a Scandal, the film adaptation of the Man Booker Prize-nominated novel by Zoë Heller. The film starred Judi Dench, Cate Blanchett, and Bill Nighy. James Christopher of The Times praised the film writing, "Eyre directs the film like a chamber play...his natural gift for framing scenes is terrifically assured. A potent and evil pleasure." The film was nominated for the BAFTA Award for Outstanding British Film as well as two Academy Awards for Best Actress for Dench and Best Supporting Actress for Blanchett. He then directed the 2005 stage musical Mary Poppins for West End and Broadway. For his work on the former production he received a Laurence Olivier Award for Best Director nomination. On 14 February 2007, Eyre's production of Nicholas Wright's The Reporter premiered at the National Theatre, London. The play explores the social climate in the years before James Mossman's death as well as the reasons for the death itself. He directed The Other Man (2008), an adaptation of a short story by Bernhard Schlink, starring Liam Neeson, Antonio Banderas, and Laura Linney.

Eyre directed a new production of Bizet's opera Carmen for the Metropolitan Opera's 2009–10 season, starring Latvian mezzo-soprano Elīna Garanča and Roberto Alagna. He returned to the Met for the 2013–14 season where he created and directed a new production of Jules Massenet's Werther with Jonas Kaufmann and Sophie Koch and returned to create and direct the 2014–15 season opening production, Mozart's The Marriage of Figaro. Eyre was planning to direct Jon Robin Baitz's stage adaptation of Hollywood legend Robert Evans' memoirs The Kid Stays in the Picture and its sequel, The Fat Lady Sang, but the project was cancelled by the producer.

=== 2010–present ===
His production of Noël Coward's Private Lives starring Kim Cattrall and Paul Gross opened at the Music Box Theatre on Broadway in November 2011 following a run in Toronto. He directed The Dark Earth and The Light Sky for the Almeida Theatre, and The Pajama Game for the Chichester Festival Theatre. In 2012, he directed Henry IV, Part I and Part II as part of the BBC's The Hollow Crown series. In November 2013, he once again won the Evening Standard Award for Best Director for Ibsen's Ghosts at the Almeida Theatre. This production moved to the West End.

In the late 2010s, Eyre directed numerous projects for the screen. In 2015 he directed the television film The Dresser starring Anthony Hopkins and Ian McKellen based on the 1980 play of the same name by Ronald Harwood. It received positive reviews as well as a Golden Globe Award for Best Limited or Anthology Series or Television Film nomination. He also directed the drama film The Children Act (2017), based on the novel of the same name by Ian McEwan and starring Emma Thompson. The following year he directed the BBC Two television film King Lear (2018) which starred Anthony Hopkins, Emma Thompson, Florence Pugh, and Jim Broadbent. It earned a nomination for the Primetime Emmy Award for Outstanding Television Movie.

In 2021, Eyre directed Allelujah, a film adaptation of Alan Bennett's play of the same name which starred Jennifer Saunders, Bally Gill, Russell Tovey, David Bradley, Derek Jacobi, and Judi Dench. His play 'The Snail House' was premiered at Hampstead Theatre in 2022.

== Recognition ==
Eyre's archive is part of the performing arts collections at the Harry Ransom Center in Austin, Texas alongside friends and collaborators like David Hare, Ian McEwan, and Tom Stoppard. His papers include his personal journals, production scripts, annotated opera libretti, correspondence, photographs, posters, and theatre ephemera.

He was appointed a Commander of the Order of the British Empire (CBE) in the 1992 New Year Honours, and knighted in the 1997 New Year Honours, receiving the honour on 4 March 1997. He became a Patron of the Alzheimer's Research Trust in 2001. He was made an Officier de l'Ordre des Arts et des Lettres in 1998, and was awarded an honorary Doctorate of Letters by the University of Nottingham on 10 July 2008. He was elected a Fellow of the Royal Society of Literature in 2011. He was appointed Member of the Order of the Companions of Honour (CH) in the 2017 New Year Honours for services to drama.

== Works ==
=== Film ===
Year	Title	Director	Writer	Producer	Notes
1983	The Ploughman's Lunch	Yes	No	No	
1983	Loose Connections	Yes	No	No	
1984	Singleton's Pluck	Yes	No	No	Also known as: Laughterhouse
1995	Richard III	No	Yes	No	
2001	Iris	Yes	Yes	No	Story by credit
2004	Stage Beauty	Yes	No	Executive	
2006	Notes on a Scandal	Yes	No	No	
2007	Atonement	No	No	Executive	
2008	The Other Man	Yes	Yes	Executive	
2017	The Children Act	Yes	No	No	
2022	Allelujah	Yes	No	No	
TBA	The Housekeeper	Yes	No	No	Filming

=== Television ===
Year	Title	Director	Writer	Producer	Notes	Ref.
1979–1981	Play for Today	Yes	Yes	Yes	Director; 5 episodes Writer; Episode: "Passmore" (1980); Producer; 13 episodes	
1981	The Cherry Orchard	Yes	No	No	BBC TV movie	
1985	Past Caring	Yes	No	No	TV movie	
1986–1995	Screen Two	Yes	No	No	2 episodes	
1988	Tumbledown	Yes	No	No	BBC TV movie	
1993	Great Episodes	Yes	No	No	Episode: "Suddenly, Last Summer"	
2000	Rockaby	Yes	No	No	TV short, part of the Beckett on Film series	
2003	Vincent in Brixton	Yes	No	No	TV movie	
2009	10 Minute Tales	Yes	No	No	Episode: "The Three Kings"	
2012	The Hollow Crown	Yes	No	No	Episodes: "Henry IV, Part 1 and Part 2"	
2015	The Dresser	Yes	Yes	No	BBC Two TV movie	
2018	King Lear	Yes	Yes	No	BBC Two TV movie	

=== Theatre ===
As a director

Year	Title	Playwright	Venue	Ref.
1976	Trumpets and Drums	Bertolt Brecht	Nottingham Playhouse	
1985–1986	Guys and Dolls	Frank Loesser	Prince of Wales Theatre, National Theatre	
1989	Hamlet	William Shakespeare	Olivier Theatre, National Theatre	
1995	Skylight	David Hare	Cottesloe Theatre, National Theatre	
1996	Skylight	David Hare	Royale Theatre, Broadway	
1995	Racing Demon	David Hare	Vivian Beaumont Theatre, Broadway	
1996	John Gabriel Borkman	Henrik Ibsen	Lyttelton Theatre, National Theatre	
1997	King Lear	William Shakespeare	Cottesloe Theatre, National Theatre	
1997–1999	The Invention of Love	Tom Stoppard	Lyttelton Theatre, National Theatre	
1998	The Judas Kiss	David Hare	Almeida Theatre, West End	
1998	The Judas Kiss	David Hare	Royale Theatre, Broadway	
1999	Amy's View	David Hare	Ethel Barrymore Theatre, Broadway	
2002	The Crucible	Arthur Miller	Virginia Theatre, Broadway	
2002	Vincent in Brixton	Nicholas Wright	Wyndham's Theatre, National Theatre	
2003	Vincent in Brixton	Nicholas Wright	John Golden Theatre, Broadway	
2005	Hedda Gabler	Henrik Ibsen	Almeida Theatre	
2004	Mary Poppins	Julian Fellowes	Prince Edward Theatre, West End	
2005	Mary Poppins	Julian Fellowes	New Amsterdam Theatre, Broadway	
2010	Private Lives	Noël Coward	Vaudeville Theatre, West End	
2011	Private Lives	Noël Coward	Music Box Theatre, Broadway	
2012	The Dark Earth and the Light Sky	Nick Dear	Almeida Theatre, West End	
2013	Quartermaine's Terms	Simon Gray	Wyndham's Theatre, West End	
2013–2015	Ghosts	Henrik Ibsen	Almeida Theatre, West End	
2013–2015	Ghosts	Henrik Ibsen	Brooklyn Academy of Music	
2015	Little Eyolf	Henrik Ibsen	Almeida Theatre, West End	
2018	Long Day's Journey Into Night	Eugene O'Neill	Wyndham's Theatre, West End	
2018	Long Day's Journey Into Night	Eugene O'Neill	Brooklyn Academy of Music	
2018-2019	My Name is Lucy Barton	Rona Munro	Bridge Theatre, West End	
2020	My Name is Lucy Barton	Rona Munro	Samuel J. Friedman Theatre, Broadway	
2019	The Bay at Nice	David Hare	Menier Chocolate Factory, West End	
2020	Blithe Spirit	Noël Coward	Duke of York's Theatre, West End	
2023	A Voyage Round My Father	John Mortimer	Theatre Royal Bath, West End	

== Awards and nominations ==
Year	Association	Category	Project	Result	Ref.
1987	British Academy Television Awards	Best Single Drama	Screen Two: The Insurance Man	Nominated	
1987	British Academy Television Awards	Best Single Drama	Past Caring	Nominated	
1989	British Academy Television Awards	Best Single Drama	Tumbledown	Nominated	
2001	British Academy Film Awards	Outstanding British Film	Iris	Nominated	
2001	British Academy Film Awards	Best Adapted Screenplay	Iris	Nominated	
2006	British Academy Film Awards	Outstanding British Film	Notes on a Scandal	Nominated	
1982	Laurence Olivier Awards	Best Director	Guys and Dolls	Won	
1989	Laurence Olivier Awards	Best Director	Racing Demon / The Voysey Inheritance	Nominated	
1996	Laurence Olivier Awards	Best Director	Skylight / La Grande Magia	Nominated	
1997	Laurence Olivier Awards	Best Director	John Gabriel Borkman	Nominated	
1998	Laurence Olivier Awards	Best Director	King Lear	Won	
2003	Laurence Olivier Awards	Best Director	Vincent in Brixton	Nominated	
2005	Laurence Olivier Awards	Best Director	Mary Poppins	Nominated	
2006	Laurence Olivier Awards	Best Director	Hedda Gabler	Won	
2014	Laurence Olivier Awards	Best Director	Ghosts	Nominated	
1997	Tony Award	Best Direction of a Play	Judas Kiss	Nominated	
2002	Tony Award	Best Direction of a Play	The Crucible	Nominated	
2002	Drama Desk Award	Outstanding Director of a Play	The Crucible	Nominated	
2002	Drama League Award	Excellence in Directing	The Crucible	Won	

== See also ==
- List of British film directors
