= Allelujah! =

Play by Alan Bennett

- Written by: Alan Bennett
- Original language: English

Premiere
- Date premiered: 11 July 2018
- Place premiered: Bridge Theatre, London

Allelujah! is a play by British playwright Alan Bennett.

== Characters and cast ==
=== Patients ===
- Mavis - Patricia England
- Lucille - Gwen Taylor
- Hazel - Sue Wallace
- Mary - Julia Foster
- Cora - Cleo Sylvestre
- Mrs Maudsley - Jaqueline Clarke
- Molly - Jacqueline Chan
- Renee - Anna Lindup
- Neville - Louis Mahoney
- Joe - Jeff Rawle
- Ambrose - Simon Williams
- Arthur - Colin Haig

=== Staff ===
- Salter - Chairman of the hospital - Peter Forbes
- Dr Valentine - Sacha Dhawan
- Sister Gilchrist - Deborah Findlay
- Nurse Pinkney - Nicola Hughes
- Ramesh - a junior doctor - Manish Gandhi
- Fletcher - a junior doctor - Gary Wood
- Gerald - physiotherapist - Richie Hart

=== Visitors ===
- Colin Colman - Joe's son, a management consultant - Samuel Barnett (actor)
- Mrs Earnshaw - Rosie Ede
- Mr Earnshaw - Duncan Wisbey
- Andy - work experience - David Moorst
- Alex - documentary director - Sam Bond
- Cliff - cameraman - Nadine Higgin

Nurses, healthcare assistants, social workers etc. were played by members of the company.

== Production ==
The play opened at the Bridge Theatre, London on 11 July 2018, running until 29 September, directed by Nicholas Hytner, designed by Bob Crowley and choreographed by Arlene Phillips.

The production was captured by National Theatre Live and was broadcast to cinemas worldwide on 1 November 2018.

== Film ==
Allelujah is a 2022 film adaptation of Alan Bennett's play starring Jennifer Saunders, Bally Gill, Russell Tovey, David Bradley, Derek Jacobi, and Judi Dench, and directed by Richard Eyre.
