= The Tenth Man (1988 film) =

Drama film of 1988

- Written by: Lee Langley; Graham Greene
- Directed by: Jack Gold
- Starring: Anthony Hopkins; Derek Jacobi; Kristin Scott Thomas
- Music by: Lee Holdridge
- Country of origin: United States
- Original language: English

Production
- Running time: 120 minutes

Original release
- Network: CBS
- Release: December 4, 1988

The Tenth Man is a television movie of 1988 in the Hallmark Hall of Fame series, based on the novel The Tenth Man (1985) by Graham Greene. It stars Anthony Hopkins, Kristin Scott Thomas, and Derek Jacobi, who received a Primetime Emmy Award for Outstanding Supporting Actor in a Miniseries or Movie.

== Plot ==
Chavel, a rich Paris lawyer, in a German prison during the Second World War and about to be executed, finds a fellow prisoner who is willing to take over his identity and die in his place. In return, the other man's family will get to keep all his money. He then has to serve out the sentence of the other man. After his release, he returns to his old home but does not reveal himself.

== Cast ==
- Anthony Hopkins as Chavel / Charlot
- Derek Jacobi as Carosse
- Kristin Scott Thomas as Thérèse Mangeot
- Cyril Cusack as the Priest
- Brenda Bruce as Madame Mangeot
- Timothy Watson as Michel Mangeot
- Paul Rogers as Breton
- Robert Morgan as German Officer
- Geoffrey Bayldon as Elderly Clerk
- Michael Attwell as Krogh
- Jim Carter as Pierre
- Peter Jonfield as Roche
