= Bally Gill =

British actor

Bally Gill (born 28 July 1992) is a British actor. He won the 2018 Ian Charleson Award for his performance as Romeo in the Royal Shakespeare Company production of Romeo and Juliet. Best known for his role as Neel Fisher in BBC drama Sherwood, he has also appeared as Agent Singh in Slow Horses, in the ITV crime series Manhunt, the BBC medical comedy-drama This Is Going to Hurt as well as AMC's Interview with the Vampire. He made his film debut in the adaptation of the Alan Bennett play Allelujah in the role of Dr Valentine.

== Early life ==
Bally Gill was born in Coventry, West Midlands, and graduated from Rose Bruford College in 2015.

== Awards and nominations ==
Year	Award	Category	Work	Role	Result	Ref
2018	Ian Charleson Award		Romeo and Juliet	Romeo	First Prize	
