= So You've Been Publicly Shamed =

2015 nonfiction book by Jon Ronson

- First edition (US)
- Author: Jon Ronson
- Genre: Current events, Popular sociology
- Publisher: Riverhead Books (US), and Pan Macmillan (UK)
- Publication date: 31 March 2015 (US) and 3 September 2015 (UK)
- Media type: Print (Hardcover and Paperback)
- Pages: 304 (first edition, hardback)
- ISBN: 978-1-59448-713-2
- OCLC: 893974244

So You've Been Publicly Shamed is a 2015 book by British journalist Jon Ronson about online shaming and its historical antecedents. The book explores the re-emergence of public shaming as an Internet phenomenon, particularly on Twitter. As a state-sanctioned punishment, public shaming was popular in Colonial America. Between 1837 in the UK and 1839 in the US, it was phased out as a punishment, not due to the increasingly populous society, as was widely held, but instead in response to rising calls for compassion.

In gathering material for his book, Ronson interviewed several individuals who had received a concentrated Internet shaming, including Jonah Lehrer. He also interviewed practitioners of 21st century public humiliation, including the former Texas District Judge and former congressional representative Ted Poe, and several instigators of widespread public shamings.

== Content ==
In the introduction, Ronson relates a story of an automated parody Twitter handle, @jon_ronson (Ronson's twitter username is actually @jonronson). The account posts a smattering of food and party-related tweets, none of which are related to the actual Jon Ronson's life. This leads to Ronson asking the bot's creators for its removal, as he believes it to be a spambot. The creators of the account call it an "infomorph", and decline Ronson's request, but eventually agree to meet in person with the author.

Ronson then records the interaction and posts it on YouTube, and is surprised when the reaction is overwhelmingly in his favor. The creators of the bot, in the wake of the public shame elicited by Ronson's video, finally agree to retire the counterfeit Twitter account.

This experience leads Ronson to re-evaluate other public shamings he's participated in, and the effects these shaming events have on both the shamed and the shaming. He begins by interviewing prominent victims of public shaming on the Internet, and the instigators of these shaming events.

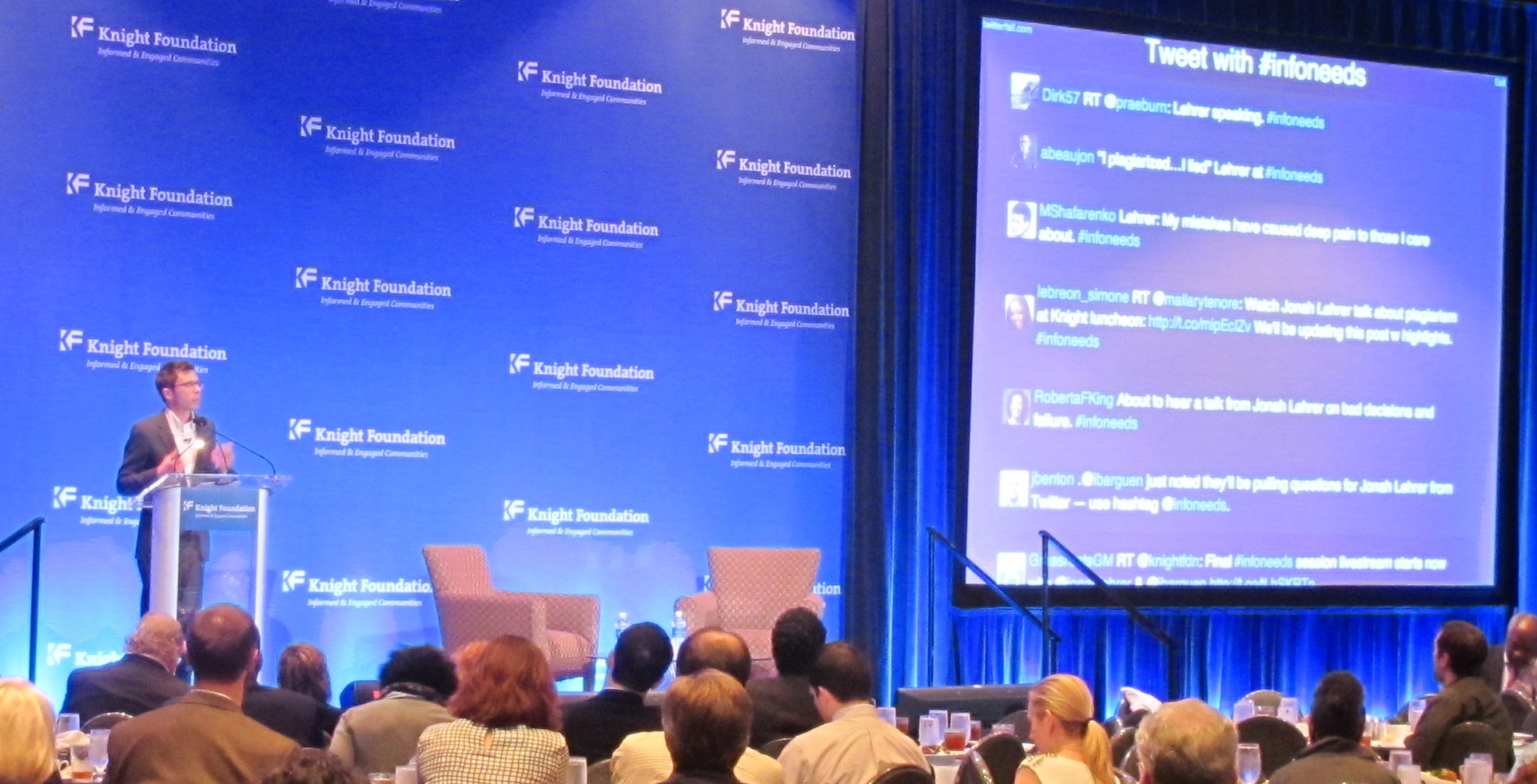
Jonah Lehrer makes a speech to the Knight Foundation after admitting that his book Imagine was based on fabricated quotes. Lehrer's speech was livestreamed over the internet and discussed on Twitter so that both Lehrer and the audience could see in real time the (often harshly critical) reaction to the speech, which was perceived as obfuscatory.

His first subject is Jonah Lehrer, disgraced popular science journalist for The New Yorker and author of the book Imagine: How Creativity Works. Ronson also interviews the journalist who exposed Lehrer's plagiarism and misuse of quotes, Michael C. Moynihan. In the days preceding Lehrer's televised apology at a conference held by the John S. and James L. Knight Foundation, Ronson interviews Lehrer while hiking through Runyon Canyon. The public humiliation inherent to Lehrer's apology speech is exacerbated by a large projector screen hung behind his speaking podium and a small television screen viewable to Lehrer, which both display a live Twitter feed of any individual tweeting with the hashtag "infoneeds". A small controversy brews as a result of Lehrer's speech's content, which some describe as arrogant and lacking sincerity. Ronson, who had recently interviewed Lehrer and was asked for thoughts on a draft, admits to having decided not to say to Lehrer before he made the speech that he found it unconvincing. Further social media upheaval occurs when it is discovered that the Knight Foundation paid Lehrer $20,000 for his apology speech.

His next subject is donglegate, an incident in which a female attendee at a nearly all-male PyCon conference, during a lecture on facilitating women's involvement in tech, heard two men sitting nearby whispering sexual jokes to one another. She photographed them and tweeted the photo. One of the developers (named only as "Hank" in the book) publicly attributed his resultant dismissal from his job to the incident, which he felt had been harmless. His account of events led to an online backlash against the woman that in turn led to the woman herself being let go from her job. Ronson reveals that at time of writing, both men had been able to find new positions in tech in the following months, whereas the woman remained unemployed and continued to face online threats and harassment in relation to the incident. He reported she'd wondered whether Hank was responsible for knowingly instigating her sustained harassment and continued unemployment, due to his publicly blaming her for his own firing, but Ronson ultimately suggests he feels the woman was primarily at fault.

The book includes a long section about how people can "hide" their negative Google Search results via legal and creative IT mechanics.

== Reception ==
Jennifer Latson of The Boston Globe remarked that "Ronson manages to be at once academic and entertaining." Matthew Hutson from The Wall Street Journal stated that the book "raises interesting questions about righteousness, reputation and conformity" but lamented that Ronson's "thoughts remain disconnected musings rather than cohering as a calculus of public shaming's costs and benefits".

== In popular culture ==
- "Hated in the Nation", a 2016 episode of the anthology television series Black Mirror, was partly inspired by So You've Been Publicly Shamed.
- "Majority Rule", a 2017 episode of the science fiction television series The Orville, was inspired by So You've Been Publicly Shamed.

== See also ==
- Cancel culture
