= Havering College =

Havering College may refer to:

- Havering College of Further and Higher Education
- Havering Sixth Form College
