= Wired (TV series) =

- Genre: Crime drama
- Written by: Kate Brooke
- Directed by: Kenny Glenaan
- Starring: Jodie Whittaker; Laurence Fox; Toby Stephens; Riz Ahmed; Charlie Brooks; Ramon Tikaram
- Country of origin: United Kingdom
- Original language: English
- No. of series: 1
- No. of episodes: 3

Production
- Executive producer: Rebecca Hodgson
- Producer: Thea Harvey
- Production location: United Kingdom
- Running time: 60 minutes
- Production company: Granada Television

Original release
- Network: ITV
- Release: 13 October – 27 October 2008

Wired is a 2008 three-part television miniseries starring Jodie Whittaker, Laurence Fox and Toby Stephens. It debuted on ITV at 9:00pm on Monday, 13 October 2008, and was shown over three consecutive weeks. The complete series was released on DVD on 10 November 2008.

== Plot ==
Single mother and bank employee Louise Evans (Jodie Whittaker) finds herself blackmailed by a former bank employee with documents reveal that she and a former partner stole £3,000 from a former employer. The boyfriend of her best friend, Philip Manningham (Laurence Fox), plans to defraud £250m from ZBG Banking, the company from which he was sacked, and after he threatens Louise she agrees to help him pull off an Internet scam. Meanwhile, Detective Crawford Hill (Toby Stephens) is working undercover in an attempt to expose the fraud ring and after a chance meeting with Louise, he realises she is involved and is key to him cracking the case. However, their relationship soon threatens to compromise everything and places Louise in mortal danger.

== Cast ==
- Jodie Whittaker as Louise Evans
- Laurence Fox as Philip Manningham
- Toby Stephens as DI Crawford Hill
- Riz Ahmed as Manesh Kunzru
- Charlie Brooks as Anna Walden
- Sacha Dhawan as Ben Chandrakar
- Ramon Tikaram as Dhruv Ralindi
- Iain McKee as Nick Benson
- Katy Cavanagh as DS Polly Stuart
- Helena Fox as Erica Wilson

== Episodes ==
No.	Title	Directed by	Written by	Original release date	Viewers (millions)
1	"The Beginning"	Kenny Glenaan	Kate Brooke	13 October 2008	5.23
2	"The Middle"	Kenny Glenaan	Kate Brooke	20 October 2008	4.41
3	"The End"	Kenny Glenaan	Kate Brooke	27 October 2008	3.55
