= Charles Babalola =

British actor (born 1990/1991)

- Born: 1990 or 1991 (age 35–36)
- Education: St Bonaventure's; Havering College; London Academy of Music and Dramatic Art
- Occupation: Actor

Charles Babalola (born 1990 or 1991) is a British actor. He was educated at St Bonaventure's school in London and went on to study drama at Havering College and the London Academy of Music and Dramatic Art (LAMDA). Upon leaving LAMDA, he received the Alan Bates Award for outstanding graduating actors.

In 2016, he appeared in the film The Legend of Tarzan and in 2018 in Helen Edmundson's film Mary Magdalene as Andrew, one of Jesus's twelve disciples.

In 2018, Babalola finished a five-month run at London's Royal National Theatre production of Network, opposite Bryan Cranston.

In 2022, it was announced that he would lead the upcoming Showtime drama series King Shaka. However, in April 2023, the network shelved the show, and its fate remained uncertain as of June 2023.

== Selected filmography ==
=== Film ===
List of film appearances, with year, title, and role shown
Year	Title	Role	Notes
2016	The Legend of Tarzan	Kulonga	
2018	Mary Magdalene	Andrew	
2020	Gretel & Hansel	The Hunter	
2024	Borderlands	Hammerlock	Scenes cut

=== Television ===
List of film appearances, with year, title, and role shown
Year	Title	Role	Notes	Ref.
2015	The Coroner	Ian Igby	Episode: "Capsized"	
2016	Thirteen	DS Jesse Rawlins	4 episodes	
2016	Endeavour	Cuthbert Mukamba	Episode: "Arcadia"	
2016, 2019	Black Mirror	Tusk	Episodes: "Hated in the Nation" (2016) and "Rachel, Jack and Ashley Too" (2019)	
2017	Broadchurch	Chas the Cook	2 episodes	
2017	Stan Lee's Lucky Man	Ade	2 episodes	
2017	Death in Paradise	Kai Johnson	Episode: "In the Footsteps of a Killer"	
2017–2020	Bancroft	DS Andy Bevan	6 episodes	
2020	Silent Witness	DS John MacNeil	2 episodes	
2021–2024	The Outlaws	Christian Taylor	17 episodes	
2026	Fightland	Ezekiel "Zeke" Marshall		
