= Amara Karan =

Sri Lankan actress (born 1984)

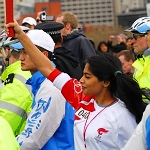
- Karan during the Olympic Torch Relay in London (2008)
- Born: Amara Karunakaran; 1 January 1984 (age 42); Wimbledon, London, England
- Education: St. Catherine's College, Oxford
- Years active: 2007–present
- Known for: Stan Lee's Lucky Man; The God Complex; Hope Street

Amara Karan (born Amara Karunakaran; 1 January 1984) is a British actress.

== Biography ==
Karan was born to Sri Lankan Tamil parents who had emigrated from Zambia to the United Kingdom two years before she was born. She was born in Wimbledon and attended Wimbledon High School.

Karan went on to study at St Catherine's College, Oxford and while there began acting in amateur plays including Sunday Morning at the Centre of the World at the Burton Taylor Theatre for which she received rave reviews and was also singled out for her performance in When We Are Married at the Old Fire Station theatre. During her time at Oxford, Karan wrote, directed, produced, and acted in a short film, By Myself, which came in second place in the 2002 Shoestring Shorts Competition.

Karan began her career as an investment banker (at Hawkpoint and CIBC World Markets) specialising in mergers and acquisitions, before studying for an MA degree in acting at The Arts Educational Schools London.

In 2007, Karan made her film debut as Rita in Wes Anderson's The Darjeeling Limited (2007), which premiered at the Venice Film Festival, and as Peaches in St Trinian's (2007). In 2008, Karan made her stage debut as Jessica in an RSC production of The Merchant of Venice and as Bianca in an RSC production of The Taming of the Shrew. With the latter, she made her West End debut at the Novello Theatre.

In 2008, Karan carried the Olympic Torch during its time in London.

In 2016, Karan co-starred on the HBO crime drama mini-series, The Night Of. In 2012, she co-starred in the film A Fantastic Fear of Everything.

Since 2016, Karan has been in a relationship with English actor Jamie de Courcey.

== Filmography ==
=== Film ===
Year	Title	Role	Notes	Ref.
2007	The Darjeeling Limited	Rita		
2007	St Trinian's	Peaches		
2011	The Task	Toni		
2012	All in Good Time	Vina		
2012	A Fantastic Fear of Everything	Sangeet		
2013	Jadoo	Shalini		
2017	Those Four Walls	Jasmine		
2018	The Death and Life of John F. Donovan	Mrs. Kureishi		
2023	T.I.M.	Rose		
2024	House of Spoils	Hiral Sen		

=== Television ===
Year	Title	Role	Notes	Ref.
2007	The Bill	Abha Chaudhari	Season 23, Episode 46 "Match Day Violence"	
2008	Agatha Christie's Poirot	Princess Shaista	Season 11, Episode 2 "Cat Among the Pigeons"	
2011	Doctor Who	Rita	Season 6, Episode 11 "The God Complex"	
2011–2012	Kidnap and Ransom	Carrie Heath, Dominic's assistant	5 episodes	
2013	Ambassadors	Isabel	Main cast, three-episode serial	
2014	Goodness Gracious Me	various roles	Reunion special	
2016	The Night Of	Chandra Kapoor	6 episodes	
2016–2018	Stan Lee's Lucky Man	DS Suri Chohan	28 episodes	
2017	Bancroft	Anya Karim	4 episodes	
2019	The Twilight Zone	Rena	Episode 1 "The Comedian"	
2021	Midsomer Murders	Adele Paige	Episode 1 "Scarecrow Murders"	
2021–2022	Hope Street	DC Leila Hussain	Main cast	
2022	Moonhaven	Indira Mare	Main cast	
2023	Culprits	Doctor	Recurring role	
2023	Fired on Mars	Crystal	Recurring role	

=== Radio ===
Year	Title	Role	Notes	Ref.
2007	The Making of a Marchioness	Lady Agatha	Frances Hodgson Burnett for BBC Radio 4	
2017	The Beard	Thea Collins	Timothy X Atack for BBC Radio 4	

=== Theatre ===
Year	Title	Role	Venue(s)	Production company	Ref.
2008	The Taming of the Shrew	Bianca	The Courtyard Theatre; Stratford-Upon-Avon, England	Royal Shakespeare Company	
2008	The Merchant of Venice	Jessica	The Courtyard Theatre; Stratford-Upon-Avon, England	Royal Shakespeare Company	
2009	The Taming of the Shrew	Bianca	The Novello Theatre; London, England	Royal Shakespeare Company	
2012	Much Ado About Nothing	Hero	The Courtyard Theatre; Stratford-Upon-Avon, England		
2022	Bloody Difficult Women	Gina Miller	Riverside Studios; London, England		

=== Video games ===
Year	Title	Voice role	Ref.
2017	Dark Souls III	Sister Friede	
