= Robert Daniel Lowe =

British actor (born 1985)

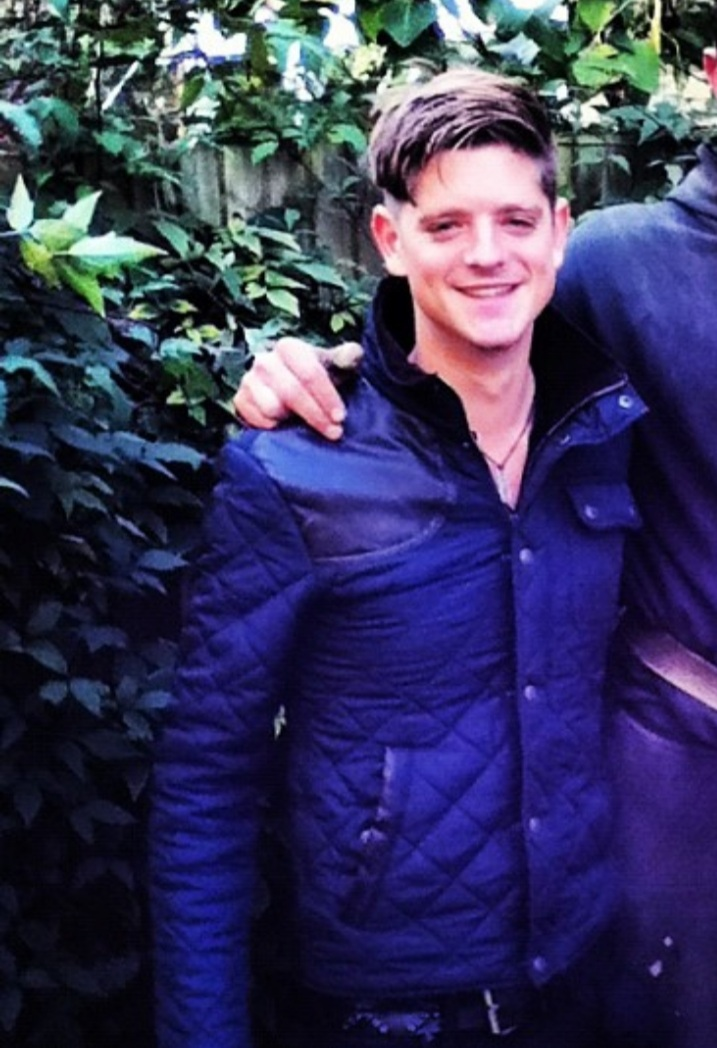
- Born: Robert Daniel Lowe; 1985 (age 40–41); Wandsworth, London, England
- Occupation: Actor
- Years active: 2000–present
- Agent: Patrick Hambleton Management

Robert Daniel Lowe (born 1985 in Wandsworth, London) is an English stage, television and film actor. Among his many theatre roles is that of 'Fleance' in Macbeth, and he has also been seen in a multitude of television programmes including a role in 12 episodes of The Bill as young offender Lee Dwyer as well as four episodes of Primeval as Jack Maitland. Doctors, Britain’s Boy Soldiers and Secret Smile and films such as Mrs Ratcliffe's Revolution and Shoot on Sight. He also appeared at 'Human Zoo' at the Courtyard Theatre, Hoxton.

He is the nephew of former Welsh 400 meter runner Jamie Baulch.

== Filmography ==
=== Films ===
Film
| Year | Title | Role | Notes |
|---|---|---|---|
| 2007 | Shoot on Sight | Sean's Mate | |
| 2007 | Mrs. Ratcliffe's Revolution | Otto | |
| 2010 | The Kid | BMX Boy | |
| 2016 | House of Salem | Mick | |
| 2017 | Black Creek | Lloyd | |
| 2021 | A Suburban Fairytale | Kaden | (completed, not released) |
| 2021 | Heads-a-Poppin'! | Jordan | (Short) (post-production, not released) |

=== TV ===
Television
| Year | Title | Role | Notes |
|---|---|---|---|
| 2001-2002 | London's Burning | Boy | (TV Series), 1 episode: "Episode #13.16" and "Episode #14.2" |
| 2001-2002 | Micawber | Mungo | (TV Series), 2 episodes: "Micawber Meets the Americans" and "Micawber Learns the Truth " |
| 2002 | The Project | Older Roy | (TV Movie) |
| 2002 | The Bill | Lee Dwyer | (TV Series), 12 episodes |
| 2003 | Single | John Barton | (TV Series), 5 episodes: "#1.1", "#1.2", "#1.3", "#1.4" and "#1.5" |
| 2004 | Secret History | Dick Trafford | (TV Series documentary), 1 episode: "Britain's Boy Soldiers" |
| 2004 | Family Business | Tim | (TV Series), 1 episode: "Episode #1.4" |
| 2005 | Secret Smile | Troy Cotton | (TV Mini-Series), 2 episodes: "Episode #1.1" and "Episode #1.2" |
| 2005 | Silent Witness | Greg Evans | (TV Series), 1 episode: "The Meaning of Death: Part 1" |
| 2006-2012 | Casualty | Cam (2006) / Harvey Greenaway (2012) | (TV Series), 4 episodes: "Target Man" "Lost and Found" and "First Impressions" then "Trust" in 2012 |
| 2007 | Sea of Fire | Tim 'Trev' Trevarthen | (TV Movie documentary) |
| 2008 | Holby Blue | Lee Burrows | (TV Series), 3 episodes: "Episode #2.4", "Episode #2.5" and "Episode #2.6" |
| 2009 | Dog Endz | Stcky Micky | (TV Movie) |
| 2009 | Primeval | Jack Maitland | (TV Series), 4 episodes: "Episode #3.4", "Episode #3.6", "Episode #3.7" and "Episode #3.8" |
| 2010 | Doctors | Sean Prentice | (TV Series), 1 episode: "No Distance Left to Run" |
| 2014 | Grass Roots | Charlie 'Benny' Bennett | (TV Series), 1 episode |
| 2019 | Bronzed | Sam | (TV Series), 1 episode |
