= Hated in the Nation =

Television episode of Black Mirror

- Black Mirror episode
- ADIs swarm around Blue Coulson (left) and Karin Parke (right). The ADIs were designed by Painting Practice with the intention of looking creepy but recognisable as bees.
- Episode no.: Series 3 Episode 6
- Directed by: James Hawes
- Written by: Charlie Brooker
- Cinematography by: Lukas Strebel
- Editing by: Mark Eckersley
- Original release date: 21 October 2016
- Running time: 89 minutes

Guest appearances
- Kelly Macdonald as Karin Parke; Faye Marsay as Blue Coulson; Benedict Wong as Shaun Li; Jonas Karlsson as Rasmus Sjoberg; Joe Armstrong as Nick Shelton; Elizabeth Berrington as Jo Powers; Charles Babalola as Tusk; Ben Miles as Tom Pickering; Esther Hall as Vanessa Dahl; Holli Dempsey as Clara Meades; Georgina Rich as Tess Wallander; Duncan Pow as Garrett Scholes

Episode chronology
← Previous "Men Against Fire"	Next → "USS Callister"

"Hated in the Nation" is the sixth and final episode in the third season of the British science fiction anthology series Black Mirror. Written by series creator and showrunner Charlie Brooker and directed by James Hawes, it premiered on Netflix on 21 October 2016, along with the rest of series three. It is the second longest episode of Black Mirror, at 89 minutes.

A Nordic noir-inspired episode, "Hated in the Nation" follows Detectives Karin Parke (Kelly Macdonald) and Blue Coulson (Faye Marsay) as they investigate a spate of deaths targeting the subjects of social media hatred, at the hands of Autonomous Drone Insects (ADIs) that have been deployed to combat environmental catastrophe as bees near extinction. It was filmed largely in London.

Informed by Brooker's experience of receiving hate mail after writing a 2004 Guardian column that disparaged George W. Bush, the episode drew comparison to The X-Files and explored themes including government surveillance and environmentalism. Across mostly positive reviews, critics praised the acting but gave mixed comments on the story and episode's length. It received middling rankings on Black Mirror installments by quality.

== Plot ==
London Detective Chief Inspector Karin Parke (Kelly Macdonald) attends a public enquiry to give evidence. She explains her role investigating the death of Jo Powers (Elizabeth Berrington), a controversial journalist who, while receiving much online hate after writing a controversial article, is found dead in her own home, with her throat slashed. Parke works with Trainee Detective Constable Blue Coulson (Faye Marsay) and Nick Shelton (Joe Armstrong). Powers' hospitalised husband claims that she cut her own throat with a wine bottle. Parke and Coulson talk to a primary school teacher who sent Powers a cake with "fucking bitch" iced on it. She tweeted "#DeathTo @JoPowersWriter" believing it to be a harmless hashtag game, but denies violent intent. Autopsy on Jo Powers revealed an Autonomous Drone Insect (ADI) lodged in the pain centre of the brain, which likely caused her to self-mutilate to stop the pain.

ADI's are created by a company called Granular and deployed by the government to replace extinct bees. Rasmus Sjoberg (Jonas Karlsson) at Granular identifies the ADI as one of theirs. Coulson asks Sjoberg to check if any of the bees had dropped off the system. Parke and Coulson suggest that it may have been hacked using a remote diagnostic controller. Sjoberg attempts to trace the source of the hack, to no avail. The next day, rapper Tusk (Charles Babalola) is being attacked on social media after insulting a child fan on television. He has an unexplained seizure and dies when his eye seemingly explodes in an MRI machine. Shaun Li (Benedict Wong) begins work on the case on behalf of the National Crime Agency (NCA) and tells Parke and Coulson that the MRI's magnetic field pulled an ADI out of Tusk's brain through his eye socket.

Coulson finds #DeathTo was started by spambots posting a "Game of Consequences" video, where the most mentioned person with the hashtag each day will be killed. Currently top is Clara Meades (Holli Dempsey), who was photographed disrespecting a war memorial. Meades is taken to a safe house. Sjoberg watches for hacks, but ends up losing control of all the ADIs. The ADIs surround the safe house. Parke and Coulson try to protect Meades, but an ADI infiltrates the house via an extractor fan and kills her. Coulson deduces that the ADIs use facial recognition. Sjoberg reveals that a condition for the government funding was to allow them to use the ADIs for mass public surveillance. Meanwhile, the public and news media realise the consequences of #DeathTo. The most-mentioned person is now Chancellor Tom Pickering (Ben Miles).

Parke interviews Granular employees, including former employee Tess Wallander (Georgina Rich). Parke learns that she attempted suicide after receiving hate for a Twitter post and was saved by colleague and flatmate Garrett Scholes (Duncan Pow). Scholes is also a Granular employee who worked on the ADI system. Coulson finds Scholes' manifesto in the memory of Jo Power's ADI. Using a geotagged selfie image, they conduct a raid on Scholes' location. They find Scholes' hacking toolkit in a hard drive, so Shelton tweets out #DeathTo Garrett Scholes, in an attempt to provoke a reaction.

Scholes's hard drive was a trojan horse, unlocking a file of IMEI numbers of everyone who used #DeathTo. Li tells Sjoberg to deactivate the system. Parke objects, believing that this is likely what Scholes intended. Parke deduces that Scholes' real targets are not the individuals killed by the bees, but everyone who used the hashtag, matching up with the theme of facing the consequences of your actions from Scholes's manifesto. Li ignores Parke and forcibly deactivates the system. The shutdown appears to work, deactivating all the bees, but suddenly fails. It triggers the ADIs to kill the 387,036 people who used the hashtag, including Shelton.

Concluding her evidence, Parke indicates that Coulson is believed dead by suicide. However, she later receives a text from Coulson, who has tracked Scholes down in an unnamed country.

== Production ==
Whilst series one and two of Black Mirror were shown on Channel 4 in the UK, in September 2015 Netflix commissioned the series for twelve episodes (split into two series of six episodes). In March 2016, Netflix outbid Channel 4 for the rights to distributing the third series, with an offer of $40 million. Due to its move to Netflix, the show had a larger budget than in previous series. "Hated in the Nation" is the sixth and final episode of the third series; all six episodes in the series were released on Netflix simultaneously on 21 October 2016. As Black Mirror is an anthology series, each instalment can be watched in any order.

=== Conception and writing ===
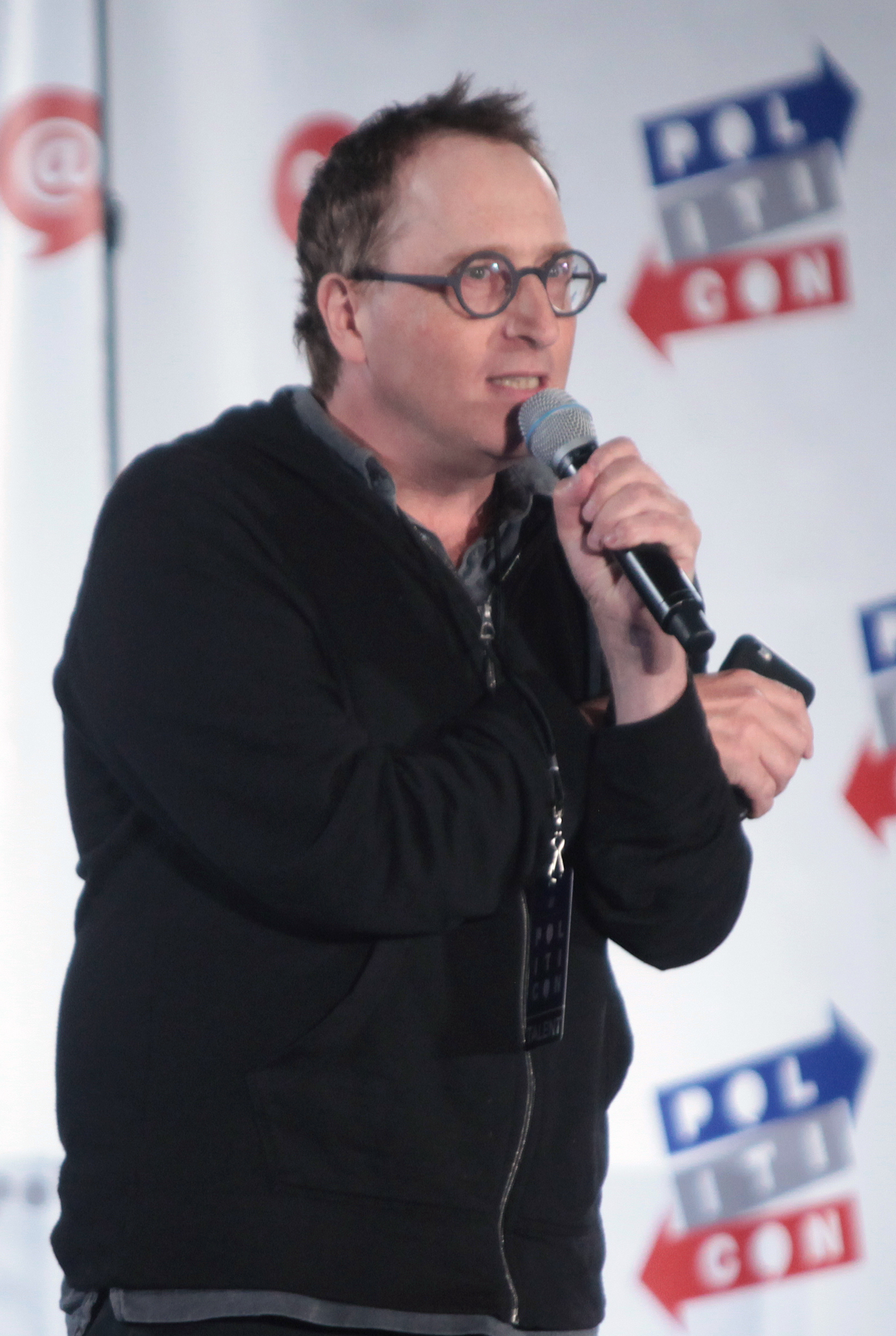
Jon Ronson's So You've Been Publicly Shamed informed the episode.

The episode was written by series creator Charlie Brooker. The initial idea was for characters to vote for an individual to be killed by a robot—a concept also used to shape the series four episode "Metalhead". "Hated in the Nation" took inspiration from Scandinavian noir thriller television series such as The Killing. Brooker found the episode difficult to write; he had previously written a spoof police procedural television series A Touch of Cloth but had not written serious works in the genre. After writing half of the script, the episode was put to one side and Brooker began working on other series three episodes. When he came back to the script, he decided to introduce the framing device of the inquiry to speed up exposition. Garrett Scholes was written to be mysterious, his character being inspired by terrorists Ted Kaczynski—nicknamed the Unabomber—and Anders Behring Breivik.

The script was also informed by Jon Ronson's book So You've Been Publicly Shamed (2015), about online shaming and its historical antecedents, and hate mail addressed to the comedian Stewart Lee over Jerry Springer: The Opera. Brooker had personal experience of a public backlash after mentioning attempted and successful presidential assassins in a satirical 2004 Guardian article about then-U.S. president George W. Bush (he wrote: "John Wilkes Booth, Lee Harvey Oswald, John Hinckley Jr, where are you now that we need you?"). After many violent messages were sent to Brooker, he apologised and The Guardian removed the article from their website. The experience informed the dialogue in the episode which compares online shaming to weather, in Brooker's words "like there's this [...] ominous ion cloud hanging over you, and rather like a mental illness". However, the experience was prior to the formation of Twitter; Brooker said that around 2013 he sensed a change in public opinion over the identification of social media as a toxic environment.

=== Filming and editing ===
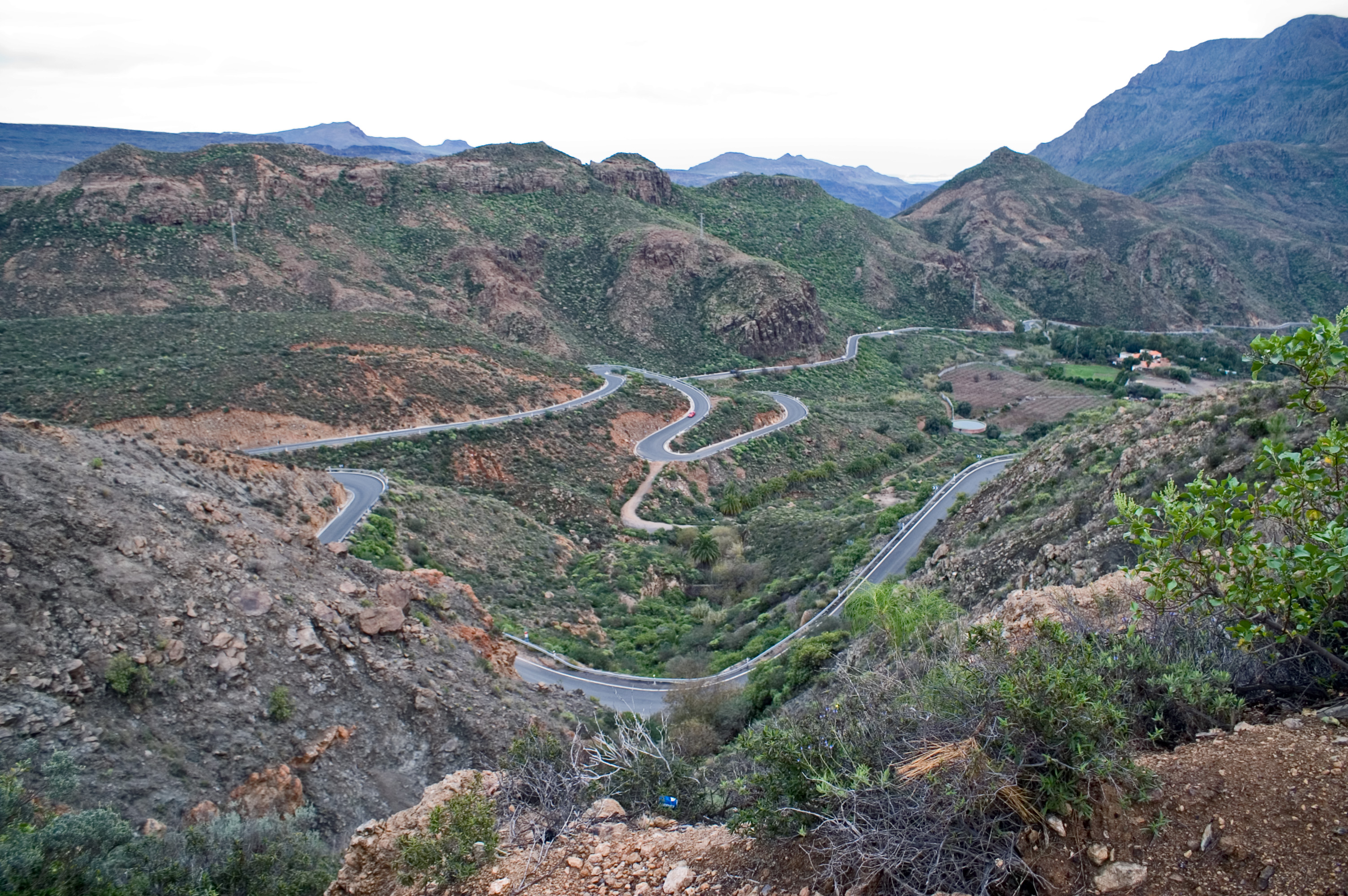
Gran Canaria, where the ending was shot

James Hawes directed the episode. He focused on pacing the escalation as the scope of the storyline changed from local to global, also choosing a limited colour palette to match the episode's genre. "Hated in the Nation" is a near-future story set and filmed in London, the production encompassing 32 locations and taking place over 23 days. The headquarters of Granular was shot on five locations. Faye Marsay played Blue Coulson, having auditioned for a part in series three episode "Men Against Fire". Kelly Macdonald starred as DCI Karin Parke. The episode's climax takes place in the safe house and was filmed over three days. The ending was filmed in Gran Canaria, as production time was too limited to shoot in the tropics. It originally featured a shot of Blue putting a knife in her bag. The soundtrack was credited to Martin Phipps, while the closing song was composed by Alev Lenz.

Work on the graphics and social media interfaces of the episode was extensive, as this was key to the narrative. The company Painting Practice worked on the design of the robotic bees, which needed to be recognisable as bees but also have a creepy aspect to them. At 89 minutes in length, "Hated in the Nation" is the second longest episode of Black Mirror behind "USS Callister: Into Infinity". Splitting the episode into two parts was considered but as the programme is an anthology series and series three would be the first to premiere on Netflix, it was kept as one episode.

== Analysis ==
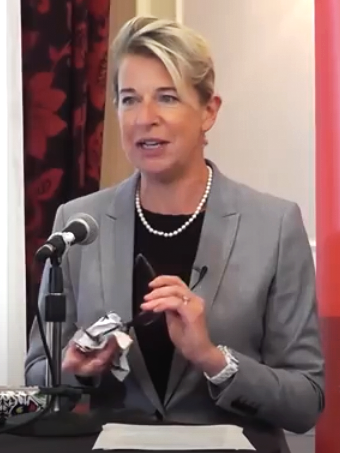
Katie Hopkins, a British political commentator who was compared to the character Jo Powers

"Hated in the Nation" is a police procedural and a work of detective fiction. Zack Handlen, writing for The A.V. Club, found that it "follows the standard beats of the cop series practically to the letter". Because of its length and tone, Collider's Adam Chitwood wrote that it "feels very much like a feature film of sorts". The episode was widely compared by critics to the 1990s science-fiction drama series The X-Files, which used bees as a recurring theme. Emily VanDerWerff of Vox wrote that The X-Files' trope of one detective being a "believer" and their colleague a "skeptic" was adapted to Blue being "tech-savvy" and Karin being a "virtual Luddite". Alex Mullane of Digital Spy instead drew comparison to the films Minority Report (2002) and I, Robot (2004), as each features a detective investigating murder in the context of a science-fiction world.

With The Verge's Lizzie Plaugic identifying a theme of cyberbullying, the episode explores the lack of consequences that social media users face for their words, and the effect that those words have on others. Screen Rant's Marian Phillips used the term "cancel culture" to describe this situation. Mullane wrote that Jo Powers was a "not-terribly-subtle" take on Katie Hopkins, a controversial British commentator. Mullane found that the episode does not show Powers positively, but also criticises "the manner in which people rally against such figures". Plaugic saw the preschool teacher who sent Powers hate mail as illustrative of how people's social media presences can be "completely disconnected from their lives". Handlen saw it fitting that Scholes was "a bit of a nothing" character, as the episode "stresses the power of anonymity". VanDerWerff thought that Scholes could be viewed as a self-insertion by Brooker, the character "full of outlandishly grand ideas" and forcing others to "consider the darker side of technology". Rob Leane wrote in Den of Geek that accounts in So You've Been Publicly Shamed were relevant to the episode, such as a woman whose career was significantly affected by a viral image of her swearing beside a military cemetery sign. Brooker was asked if "policing Twitter" was a solution to issues identified by the episode and replied: "I don't know the answer!" He said that "people should be more accountable", but that it was "difficult to see how you do that without the law getting involved".

The Black Mirror episode also portrays how society lose their sense of responsibility when they are part of a larger group, even if they are not directly the ones causing harm. In Joel Feinberg's Collective Responsibility, he argues that moral responsibility can still be attributed to a group when harm comes from collective actions or failure of its members, even if no single individual's contribution is entirely decisive. He gives an example of bystanders who all do not rescue a drowning swimmer; while no one person is entirely responsible, each individual is still blameworthy because "each has a duty to attempt rescue," and their collection inaction results in harm. Similarly, in "Hated in the Nation," each person who posted or used the #DeathTo hashtag may have thought their behavior was harmless initially; collectively however, all hashtag-users allowed for violence to occur. Like Feinberg's bystanders in his writing, these social media users are not all equally liable for causing death, but they are still morally implicated because they took part in a practice that they knew could contribute to harm, even if they attempted to defend themselves for the use of the hashtag.

Building on this, Roger Scruton's Hiding Behind the Screen writes that online interaction itself impacts how people relate to others. Screen regulated relationships show how digital interaction impacts the conditions of moral engagement. Scruton argues that when society interacts through a screen or social media, they retail control over attention and exposure, such as encountering others as images rather than fully present beings, which makes these interactions much less serious. He explains that online, "I have my finger on the button," meaning a person can have less responsibility for their actions. This helps explain the behavior around the #DeathTo hashtag, where people casually join in on a trend, without fully considering the consequences behind it or who the person is that they are impacting. Because they are not face-to-face, they do not have the ability to see the immediate impact of their words or take responsibility in the same way they would in real life. Online, others are images or usernames, not real people, which makes it easier to do as one pleases over the internet. In this way, the episode indicates that online interaction itself encourages society to detach from the consequences of their behavior or actions, which permits harmful behavior to occur more easily.

Other topics include government surveillance and environmentalism. David Sims of The Atlantic saw government surveillance to be "a particularly prevalent concern in the U.K." due to its scope. In Variety, Sonia Saraiya linked the themes of social media and government surveillance in that "both blur the divide between the public and private spheres", and the episode explores whether either "ends up making us more connected or safer". On the subject of environmentalism, Mullane saw the setting as a "near-future in which species are regularly blinking out of existence due to climate change" and "human indifference", among them bees. Leane found that similar bee technologies had been piloted in the real world, including the RoboBee, which is designed for agriculture or disaster relief. Greenpeace has made recommendations that governments should invest in prevention of colony collapse disorder over such technologies.

Allusions are made to previous episodes, largely through news tickers and trending topics on displayed social media screens. Blue says that she left forensics after seeing materials confiscated from Iain Rannoch, a child torturer and murderer from "White Bear". A news channel shown, UKN, appeared in previous episodes. A ticker announces the MASS technology from "Men Against Fire". Another reports on a technology from "White Christmas"—cookies—being ruled to have human rights, while a later ticker references "Playtest" character Shou Saito and "White Bear" character Victoria Skillane. Trending social media topics reference a video game from "Playtest", the prime minister from "The National Anthem" and White Bear from the episode of the same name. The hashtag #DeathTo trends with Skillane and a ticker says that she attempts suicide in jail. Waldo of "The Waldo Moment" is seen as a laptop sticker.

== Critical reception ==
The review aggregator Rotten Tomatoes, which gave the episode an average score of 80% based on 20 reviews, summarised that it "concludes Black Mirror's third season on a strong note, effectively conveying the sometimes fatal consequences of online hate through a narrative that is morally complex and cinematically invigorating". The episode received ratings of 8.3 out of 10 in Paste, four out of five stars in Vulture and The Telegraph, an A− in Entertainment Weekly and a B+ in The A.V. Club. Euan Ferguson of The Observer saw it as the best of the series three episodes, while Handlen thought it neither the best nor worst. Chancellor Agard of Entertainment Weekly praised it as "very strong". Some critics viewed the episode as too long, with Sims saying that it "makes its point very repetitively", though Mullane found that the episode was "well-paced" and "didn't drag". Contrastingly, The Telegraph's Robbie Collin reviewed that Hawes used the runtime "to give the moral complexities of Brooker's script the breathing space they deserve". Vulture's Charles Bramesco reviewed that there was "agile movement between cerebral sci-fi and emotionally rooted moralizing". Handlen saw the episode as "underdeveloped in some places" and "overdeveloped in others".

The cast received praise. Macdonald and Marsay received positive reception as Karin and Blue, respectively, with Agard writing that they "just gave fantastic performances that complemented each other". Bramesco said that Macdonald "lays claim to the episode's best lines", having demonstrated much "wry comedy". Wong as Li and Miles as Pickering were also praised. Agard approved of Scholes being grounded by "motivations in something personal", though Plaugic saw his character as less interesting than an unexplored potential for the episode to show how #DeathTo participants act once realising its effects. The soundtrack was also praised, with Collin praising Phipps' "keening" score and Mullane finding a composition by Lenz "beautifully haunting".

The story received mixed commentary. VanDerWerff found that the "full weight" of Scholes' actions "doesn't register as much as it could", though praising the "nasty" twist and "nicely inconclusive" ending. Handlen concurred that the episode "downplays the massive deaths" but dissented in finding that the ending does not give "sufficient resolution" for Scholes. Plaugic believed that the episode "never figures out exactly what it's critiquing". Agard was "genuinely engaged with the story", while Bramesco praised the writing for a "surprising facility for the stylized language of pulp crime novels". Ferguson found the episode "clever" and "ripe with thought". Some minor details were criticised. Mullane thought it odd that no character attempted to block the air vent during the bee attack, when it seems that characters previously look at the vent, while VanDerWerff noted that the story remains in the U.K. despite the #DeathTo game not appearing to be limited to the country.

=== Black Mirror episode rankings ===
"Hated in the Nation" received mixed positions on many critics' rankings of the 23 instalments in the Black Mirror series, from best to worst.

- 4th – Corey Atad, Esquire
- 6th – Travis Clark, Business Insider
- 9th – Charles Bramesco, Vulture
- 10th – Ed Power, The Telegraph
- 12th – James Hibberd, Entertainment Weekly
- 14th – Morgan Jeffery and Rosie Fletcher, Digital Spy
- 17th – Aubrey Page, Collider
- 22nd – Matt Donnelly and Tim Molloy, TheWrap

IndieWire authors ranked the 22 Black Mirror instalments excluding Bandersnatch by quality, giving "Hated in the Nation" a position of 5th. Eric Anthony Glover of Entertainment Tonight found the episode to be 11th-best of the 19 episodes from series one to four. Additionally, Proma Khosla of Mashable ranked the same instalments by tone, concluding that "Hated in the Nation" was the third-most bleak.

Other critics ranked the 13 episodes in Black Mirror's first three series.

- 3rd – Adam David, CNN Philippines
- 8th – Mat Elfring, GameSpot
- 8th – Jacob Hall, /Film
- 12th – Andrew Wallenstein, Variety

Some critics ranked the six episodes from series three of Black Mirror in order of quality.

- 3rd – Jacob Stolworthy and Christopher Hooton, The Independent
- 5th – Liam Hoofe, Flickering Myth

== See also ==
- Assassination market
- Prey (2002), a book by Michael Crichton with a similar premise
- No. 6 (2003), a Japanese anime with a similar concept of government-controlled parasitic wasps
- Untraceable (2008), a film directed by Gregory Hoblit where victims are similarly murdered based on online voting results
- The Killing Vote (2023), a South Korean television series with a similar concept
