= Fightland (TV series) =

2026 boxing drama television series

- Genre: Boxing drama; Crime drama
- Created by: Daniel Fajemisin-Duncan; Marlon Smith; Damione Macedon; Raphael Jackson Jr.
- Starring: Howard Charles; Nicholas Pinnock; Deborah Ayorinde; Charles Babalola; Anita-Joy Uwajeh; Tahirah Sharif; Tyler Conti; Richard Pepple; Sylvester Akinrolabu
- Countries of origin: United Kingdom; United States
- Original language: English
- No. of series: 1
- No. of episodes: 8

Production
- Executive producers: 50 Cent; Damione Macedon; Raphael Jackson Jr.; Daniel Fajemisin-Duncan; Marlon Smith; Francis Hopkinson; Kate Leadbetter; Otto Bathurst
- Running time: 50–54 minutes
- Production companies: G-Unit Television; Expanded Media

Original release
- Network: Starz (US)
- Release: July 31, 2026 – present
- Network: Sky Atlantic (UK)
- Release: August 27, 2026 – present

Fightland is a boxing crime drama television series created by Daniel Fajemisin-Duncan, Marlon Smith, Damione Macedon and Raphael Jackson Jr.. It premiered on July 31, 2026, on Starz in the United States and August 27, 2026, on Sky Atlantic in the United Kingdom.

== Premise ==
The series follows Maduka “Duke” Kilroy, a disgraced, formerly incarcerated boxing champion who returns to London to seek vengeance against the crime family he thinks betrayed him.

== Cast and characters ==
- Howard Charles as Maduka "Duke" Kilroy
- Nicholas Pinnock as Kingsley Marshall
- Deborah Ayorinde as Joy Marshall
- Charles Babalola as Ezekiel "Zeke" Marshall
- Anita-Joy Uwajeh as Cebella "Cece" Marshall
- Tahirah Sharif as Kim Harper
- Tyler Conti as Justin "Jay" Hall
- Richard Pepple as Gary "Gazzer" Kilroy
- Sylvester Akinrolabu as Joseph "The Jackhammer" Minott
- Sebastián Capitán Viveros as Lazaro
- Daniel Donskoy as Nikolai
- Hero Del Valle Marfo as Aiden Marshall
- Jurell Carter as Calvin Kilroy
- Clarke Peters as Eric Colman

== Production ==
Circa 2023, the series was in development with G-Unit Television. Fightland is created by Daniel Fajemisin-Duncan, Marlon Smith, Damione Macedon and Raphael Jackson Jr.. Macedon and Jackson Jr. serve as showrunners.

Casting was announced in September 2025, with Howard Charles set to lead alongside Nicholas Pinnock, Deborah Ayorinde, and Charles Babalola alongside Anita-Joy Uwajeh, Tahirah Sharif, Tyler Conti and Richard Pepple.

Principal photography took place in Newham, East London, in 2025. Filming locations included Peacock's Gym.

== Episodes ==
No.	Title	Directed by	Written by	US release date	UK release date
1	"The Only Round That Matters Is the Next One"	Otto Bathurst	Story by : Daniel Fajemisin-Duncan & Marlon Smith; Teleplay by : Daniel Fajemisin-Duncan & Marlon Smith and Damione Macedon & Raphael Jackson Jr.	July 31, 2026	August 27, 2026
2	"Brick by Brick"	Otto Bathurst	Damione Macedon & Raphael Jackson Jr.	August 7, 2026	August 27, 2026
3	"No Innocents"	Sebastian Thiel	Charlene James	August 14, 2026	August 27, 2026
4	"Protect Yourself at All Times"	Sebastian Thiel	Jessica Sinyard	August 21, 2026	September 3, 2026
5	"I Want This"	Colm McCarthy	Elliot Warren	August 28, 2026	September 10, 2026
6	"There Is a War Coming"	Colm McCarthy	Jessica Sinyard	September 4, 2026	September 17, 2026
7	"Without Me, There Is No You"	Tessa Hoffe	Damione Macedon & Raphael Jackson Jr.	September 11, 2026	September 24, 2026
8	"You Won't See Me Coming"	Tessa Hoffe	Daniel Fajemisin-Duncan & Marlon Smith	September 25, 2026	October 1, 2026

== Release ==
The series premiered on July 31, 2026, on Starz in the United States. and on August 27 on Sky Atlantic in the United Kingdom.

== Reception ==
On the review aggregator website Rotten Tomatoes, 69% of 16 critics' reviews are positive, with an average of rated reviews of 5.4/10. Metacritic, which uses a weighted average, assigned the film a score of 58 out of 100, based on 7 critics, indicating "mixed or average" reviews.
