= The Making of a Lady =

2012 television film

The Making of a Lady is a television film based on the 1901 novel The Making of a Marchioness by Frances Hodgson Burnett that uses a screenplay adaptation by Kate Brooke. The film premiered in 2012 on ITV in Britain and was subsequently broadcast on PBS in the United States in 2014.

"The film tells the story of Emily Fox-Seton, a young, educated woman who has no money and few prospects. She’s smart and kind, but that does not seem destined to take her out of her rented flat in London, where she is three weeks behind on rent. Then a middle-aged marquis sweeps (politely walks) into her life and offers her a marriage of convenience—he needs a wife to satisfy his family, and she needs security."

== Plot summary ==
Impoverished gentlewoman Emily Fox Seton is on temporary trial for hire as personal secretary to exacting Lady Maria Byrne. Overbearing Lady Maria is pressuring her reluctant widowed nephew, Lord James Walderhurst, to remarry and has arranged to present several suitable candidates to him at an evening soiree. Impressed by Emily’s initiative in planning the soiree and running errands, Lady Maria tells Walderhurst she will hire the efficient Emily.

At the soiree, finding both favored candidates beautiful but tedious, Walderhurst appeals to Emily to switch place cards next to him at dinner to spare him from further inane conversation. Furious that Emily has done so without consulting her, Lady Maria dismisses Emily. Waiting outside, Lord Walderhurst apologizes to Emily for causing her dismissal, escorting her to her shabby lodgings to ensure her safety. Drawing her out, he learns that she was orphaned and raised genteelly by an uncle but required to earn her own living. The next day Walderhurst calls on Emily to propose a marriage of convenience, rationalizing that he has observed her to be a refined, sensible woman who would understand his requirements in a wife. Initially thinking him rash, Emily finally accepts, convinced that other options for them both are less desirable and that he would be genial.

At their wedding, Emily meets Walderhurst’s cousin, Captain Alec Osborn, and his wife, Hester, a native who Alec married during army service in India, where he contracted malaria. When Lady Maria disdains the tendency of Walderhurst men to choose “unsuitable wives,” Emily sympathizes with the Osbornes. Lady Maria tells her that Alec had counted on being heir to the Marquess title and estates, with Walderhurst remaining unmarried. Both Lady Maria and Walderhurst express distaste for Alec’s constantly wheedling money from them, learning that Alex obtained money from them both for the same malaria medication.

Despite their “marriage of convenience,” Walderhurst and Emily quickly become attracted to each other and consummate their marriage. Shortly afterward, Walderhurst is recalled to his army regiment to address a crisis in India. Emily wants to accompany him, but he refuses to risk her life in India, where his first wife died. Emily asks her friend Jane to stay. Shortly after Walderhurst’s departure, Alec and Hester Osborne arrive with a “letter from Walderhurst” asking them to ensure his new wife’s needs are met. Emily agrees to their staying at the estate, but Mr. Litton, the long-time butler, is skeptical. When Alec has another malaria attack, Hester summons her old ayah, Ameerah, to care for him.

Emily learns that she is pregnant, writing Walderhurst the good news. Alec swats Emily’s horse, causing it to jostle her roughly, though claiming to have been unaware of her pregnancy. Taking another look at “Walderhurst’s letter”, Emily notes that the handwriting differs from other correspondence. Wary, Emily asks Litton to get help from the village. When Litton is found dead in a pond, the alarmed servants vacate the house, leaving Emily alone with the Osbornes and Jane, who Alec has begun to seduce.

Ameerah gives Emily a special “health potion” for her pregnancy, but Emily only pretends to drink it. Ameerah tries to force Emily to drink it to induce a miscarriage. Emily stealthily appeals to Jane to seek help from the village, 10 miles away. After failing to dissuade Jane from her mission, Alec hunts her with a shotgun. Jane hides from Alec in an old ruin, shooting him with his own shotgun after he stumbles and drops it.

Abandoning all pretense, Hester and Ameerah chase Emily, who hides in a secret priest’s hole. Finding Emily, Ameerah smothers her to unconsciousness with a pillow but is interrupted by the arrival of Walderhurst, who set out upon learning of Emily’s pregnancy. Ameerah tells him that Emily has died from a miscarriage, and Hester comforts him while Ameerah goes to finish off Emily. Suddenly repentant, Hester tells Walderhurst that Emily is alive and he can still save her. Walderhurst fights off Ameerah, saving Emily. Jane arrives with Alec’s dead body and help from the village.

In an epilogue, the loving Walderhurst and Emily play hide-and-seek throughout the manor with two young sons.

== Cast ==
Emily Fox Seaton – Lydia Wilson
Lord James Walderhurst - Linus Roache
Jane – Sarah Ridgeway
Captain Alec Osborn – James D’Arcy
Lady Maria Byrne – Joanna Lumley
Hester Osborn – Hasina Haque
Ameerah – Souad Faress
Mr. Litton – Malcolm Storry
Mrs. Litton – Claire Hackett
Mrs. Parke – Maggie Fox
Annabelle Rivers – Victoria Ross
Agatha Slade – Lucy Gape

Director – Richard Curson Smith
Writers – Kate Brooke, Frances Hodgson Burnett
