= Havering College of Further and Higher Education =

Havering Colleges of Further and Higher Education

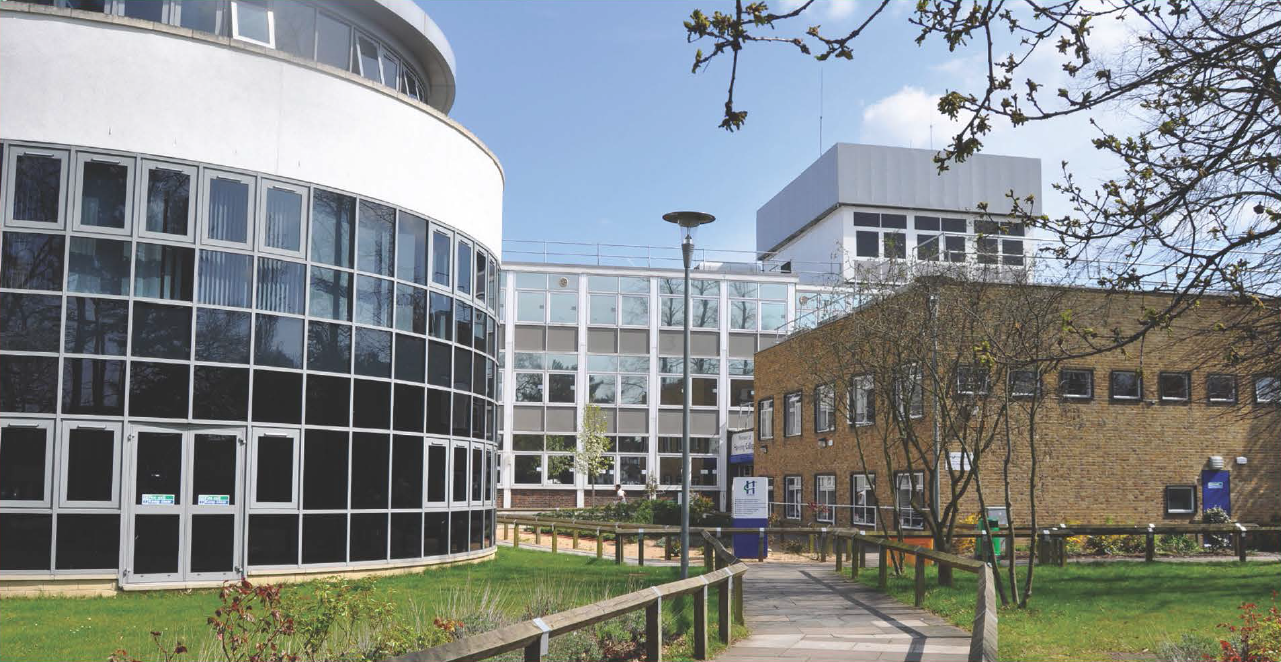

Location
- Ardleigh Green Road; Hornchurch, RM11 2LL; England; 51.581369°N 0.221845°E

Information
- Type: College
- Established: 1947; 79 years ago
- Local authority: London Borough of Havering
- Department for Education URN: 130444 Tables
- Ofsted: Reports
- Chair of Governors: Stan Rose
- Interim Principal: Samantha Ringer
- CEO: Gerry McDonald
- Age: 14+
- Enrolment: 12,954 (January 1st 2020)
- Website: www.havering-college.ac.uk

Havering College of Further and Higher Education was a college founded in 1947 in the London Borough of Havering that provided part-time and full-time education to students aged 14+. The college is commonly referred to as Ardleigh Green college.

== History ==
Following the introduction of the Education Act 1944, the Essex Education Committee acquired the majority of the Nelmes Estate in Hornchurch, including Victorian era Ardleigh House and surrounding 15 acres of land.

Ardleigh House was initially used as a community and youth centre, and as a centre for part-time day release courses. The facilities were very basic, confined to upstairs rooms, and allowed only for basic instruction.

Some years later, two additional classrooms with storage space were built, and the local authority Further Education Committee started to plan for an assembly hall and craft workshops for what was then called 'Ardleigh House Centre for Further Education'.

Expenditure was approved in 1949 for another 14,000 square ft. of administration and teaching facilities, as well as communal accommodation for a student population of 400.

In 1958 A. W. Ebdon became Ardleigh House Centre for Further Education's second warden and oversaw the completion of the new facilities. He then became the first principal of a newly renamed Hornchurch College of Further Education.

During the 1970s there was a commitment to improve standards of training but pressure on space remained an issue. This issue was resolved with the adoption of the Quarles School site in Harold Hill.

In 1992 the college was incorporated with its current name.

== Havering College Today ==
The College currently has two campuses; the main Ardleigh Green campus in Hornchurch and the Rainham Campus Construction Centre in Rainham. A plan scheduled for 2020 is to substantially develop the capacity of Ardleigh Green and the Rainham Campus Construction Centre using the income from the concluded sale of the Quarles campus to Havering Borough Council.

Lord Baker launched two Career Colleges in Construction and Engineering at Havering College in October 2017. These Career Colleges focus on employer engagement, providing learners with work experience opportunities alongside their industry-recognised qualifications.

In September 2018, the College opened the Plumbing Centre of Excellence, a joint venture with SoPHE and CIPHE. This employer-led Centre ensures students' skills and knowledge are developed in line with industry requirements.

== The corporation ==
Stan Rose heads the governing body as chair of the corporation, having an association with the college dating back to 1974 when he was a visiting lecturer. As a member of the college's Business Liaison team, he represented the college on Havering Council’s Work Related Education Committee, before becoming a member of the governing body in 1990.

The rest of the governing body is made up of a range of current and retired professionals with varied working backgrounds, alongside staff and student governors.

== Notable former students ==
- Charles Babalola, actor (Bancroft, The Outlaws)
- Eddie Hearn, Boxing promoter and Chairman of Matchroom sports
- Stacey Solomon, television personality and singer.
