= Shulman House =

House in Los Angeles, California

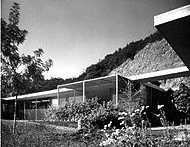

- Location within the Los Angeles metropolitan area
- 34°7′23.6028″N 118°22′3.756″W
- Location: 7875-7877 Woodrow Wilson Drive, Hollywood, Los Angeles, California

History
- Built: 1949-50

Site notes
- Governing body: private

Los Angeles Historic-Cultural Monument
- Designated: March 25, 1987
- Reference no.: 325

The Shulman House is a mid-century steel home and studio in the Hollywood Hills. In 1947 architectural photographer Julius Shulman asked architect Raphael Soriano to build him a house and studio in the Hollywood Hills. By August 1947 the design was decided upon, and construction began in the early months of 1949. The building took nine months to complete and was occupied in March 1950. Garrett Eckbo designed the landscaping. It has remained unaltered, and the Shulman House was designated a Historic-Cultural Monument by the City of Los Angeles in 1987.

The house was sold for $2,250,000 on November 24, 2010, to writer Jonah Lehrer, who resides there with his wife Sarah L. Liebowitz.
