= The Tenth Man (novel) =

1985 novel by Graham Greene

- First edition cover
- Author: Graham Greene
- Language: English
- Genre: Thriller novel
- Publisher: The Bodley Head and Anthony Blond
- Publication date: 1 January 1985
- Publication place: United Kingdom
- Media type: Print (hardback & paperback)
- Pages: 158 pp
- ISBN: 0-370-30831-X
- OCLC: 11351816
- Dewey Decimal: 823/.912 19
- LC Class: PR6013.R44 T4 1985b

The Tenth Man is a 1985 short novel by the British novelist Graham Greene.

== Background ==
In the introduction to the first edition of his novel, Greene states that he had forgotten about this story until receiving a letter about it from a stranger in 1983. Greene had first suggested it as an idea for a film script in 1937, set during the Spanish Civil War, and later developed it while under contract with MGM during the 1940s. Nothing came of it and the rights were offered for sale by MGM in 1983. The buyer (Anthony Blond) allowed Greene to revise and subsequently publish the work. Greene also writes of this novel that "I prefer it in many ways to The Third Man".

== Plot summary ==
The story begins in a prison in occupied France during the Second World War. It is decreed that one in every ten prisoners is to be executed; lots are drawn to decide who will die. One of the men chosen is a rich lawyer. He offers all his money to anyone who will take his place. One man agrees. Upon his release from prison the lawyer must face the consequences of his actions.

The story comprises four parts. In Part I, set in prison, the occupying German guards issue a decimation order to the thirty inmates. One of the three chosen by drawing lots is a rich lawyer named Chavel. Chavel becomes hysterical and desperately offers his entire wealth to any man willing to die in his place. A young man, Michel Mangeot, known as Janvier, who is dying of tuberculosis, accepts his offer and is executed as Chavel in the morning.

In Part II, the war is over and Chavel is alive and free, but virtually destitute. He returns to the house he sold for his life and finds it occupied by Janvier's mother and sister, Thérèse. Assuming the false name Charlot, he becomes their servant.

Part III sees the arrival of an impostor, named Carosse, who claims to be Chavel. Carosse attempts to denounce Charlot, win the favour of Thérèse and stake a claim on the property.

Finally in Part IV, Charlot, having fallen in love with Thérèse, must save her from Carosse, as a means of redemption from his earlier cowardice.

== Main characters ==
- Chavel - A Paris lawyer who in exchange for all his assets persuades Janvier to take his place in front of the firing squad and, when released penniless and homeless, goes back to his old house as a servant under the name of Charlot.
- Michel Mangeot – AKA Janvier, a fellow prisoner dying from tuberculosis, who achieves his lifelong goal of dying rich by trading his life for Chavel's.
- Thérèse - Michel's twin sister, who inherits Chavel's house, and with it a hatred of the man who by his wealth and cowardice caused her brother's death, but starts to fall in love with Charlot.
- Carosse - A collaborator and murderer, whose real name is Philippe Breton; on the run, comes to the house and pretends to be Chavel, thinking the latter to be dead; he attempts to displace Charlot in the affections of Thérèse.

== Film, television and theatrical adaptations ==
The book was turned into a 1988 television movie starring Anthony Hopkins as Chavel and Kristin Scott Thomas as Therese in the Hallmark Hall of Fame series. Derek Jacobi played Carosse, The Imposter, for which he received a Primetime Emmy Award for Outstanding Supporting Actor in a Miniseries or Movie.

The book was also adapted by Kate Brooke for the stage and presented at the New End Theatre in 1994.
