= Imagine: How Creativity Works =

Book by Jonah Lehrer

- Hardcover edition
- Author: Jonah Lehrer
- Language: English
- Subject: Brain science, creativity
- Publisher: Houghton Mifflin
- Publication date: 2012
- Publication place: United States
- Pages: 279
- ISBN: 9780547386072

Imagine: How Creativity Works is the third non-fiction book by Jonah Lehrer, published in 2012. It explores brain science, and creativity and its social aspects. By July 2012, the book had been recalled by its publisher due to factual inaccuracies.

== Fabrication of quotations ==
In July 2012, Lehrer acknowledged that he fabricated some quotes attributed to Bob Dylan. Sale of the electronic book as well as physical shipment of the book has been halted.

In an article on August 10, Steve Myers alleged that quotes from magician Teller, of the performance duo Penn and Teller, were fake, after a fan saw a discrepancy in previous quotes from Teller from an article in 2009 in Wired magazine, also by Lehrer. Teller confirmed that the quotes from the Wired article in 2009 were accurate, while the ones from Imagine: How Creativity Works were not.

== See also ==
- How We Decide
- Proust Was a Neuroscientist
