= How We Decide =

Book by Jonah Lehrer

- Hardcover edition
- Author: Jonah Lehrer
- Subject: Decision making, psychology
- Genre: Non-fiction
- Publisher: Houghton Mifflin
- Publication date: February 9, 2009
- Pages: 302 pp.
- ISBN: 978-0-618-62011-1

How We Decide is a 2009 book by journalist Jonah Lehrer, that provides biological explanations of how people make decisions and offers suggestions for making better decisions. It is published as The Decisive Moment: How the Brain Makes Up Its Mind in the United Kingdom.

On March 1, 2013, following revelations that Lehrer had been caught in numerous falsifications in his books, Houghton Mifflin Harcourt announced the book was taken "off sale" after an internal review.

== Summary ==
Sections/chapters of the book are titled as follows:

- Introduction
- The Quarterback in the Pocket
- The Predictions of Dopamine
- Fooled by a Feeling
- The Uses of Reason
- Choking on Thought
- The Moral Mind
- The Brain Is an Argument
- The Poker Hand
- Coda

== See also ==
Similarly themed books include:

- Proust Was a Neuroscientist
- Imagine: How Creativity Works
- Made to Stick
- Microtrends
- Think!: Why Crucial Decisions Can't Be Made in the Blink of an Eye
- Thinking, Fast and Slow
- Thinking Strategically
