= Donglegate =

Online shaming incident

Donglegate was an online shaming incident. A double entendre on the word "dongle" was overheard at a Python Conference (PyCon) programmers' convention on March 17, 2013, which led to two people being fired and a denial-of-service attack.

== History ==
At the PyCon technology conference in March 2013, a female participant, heard two men seated nearby using the words "dongle" and "forking" in reference to the male presenter, which she perceived as a sexual joke (see sexual innuendo). She photographed the attendees with their faces visible, then published the photograph on Twitter including a shaming statement in her tweet. The following day, the employer of one of the photographed individuals, a software developer, terminated his employment because of the joke.

In response to the public shaming of the developers, Internet users who were uninvolved launched a DDoS attack on the woman's employer, SendGrid, and according to an article by Jon Ronson in The New York Times Magazine, demanded her firing. SendGrid subsequently terminated her employment later the same day. Following the incident, PyCon updated its attendee rules stating, "Public shaming can be counter-productive to building a strong community. PyCon does not condone nor participate in such actions out of respect."

In a 2014 interview, the woman—still unemployed—speculated whether the developer was responsible for instigating the Internet backlash against her. The developer, who was offered a new job "right away", said he had not engaged with those who sent him messages of support, and had posted a short statement on Hacker News the same night after he was fired saying in part that the woman had "every right to report me to staff, and I defend her position".

== See also ==
- So You've Been Publicly Shamed (a 2015 book by British journalist Jon Ronson)
