= Secret Smile =

2005 British TV drama serial

- Secret Smile DVD cover
- Created by: Nicci Gerrard; Sean French; Kate Brooke
- Written by: Nicci Gerrard; Sean French; Kate Brooke
- Directed by: Christopher Menaul
- Starring: David Tennant; Kate Ashfield
- Composer: Edmund Butt
- Country of origin: United Kingdom
- Original language: English
- No. of series: 1
- No. of episodes: 2

Production
- Executive producers: Andy Harries; Charles Eaton
- Producer: Jake Lushington
- Running time: 90 minutes
- Production company: Granada Television

Original release
- Network: ITV
- Release: 12 December – 13 December 2005

Secret Smile is a British drama television serial in two parts shown by ITV in December 2005. It is set in Acton, London and is based on the 2003 Nicci French book of the same name, directed by Christopher Menaul and starring David Tennant, Claire Goose and Kate Ashfield.

== Overview ==
When Miranda (Kate Ashfield) meets attractive and confident Brendan (David Tennant), a seemingly harmless fling ensues. But her attempt at breaking it off with him leads to a passionate web of lies, deception and death.

== Plot summary ==
While attending a friend's birthday party, Miranda Cotton meets the handsome Brendan Block. The two sleep together that night and begin a relationship. Ten days later, Miranda arrives home to find that Brendan has let himself in and gone through her belongings. She promptly ends the relationship, causing Brendan to storm out of her flat after verbally abusing her.

A month later, Miranda is contacted by her sister Kerry, inviting her to meet her new boyfriend: Brendan Block. Miranda warns Brendan against hurting her sister, but he replies that he is genuinely in love with Kerry.

As time passes, it becomes apparent to Miranda that Brendan is using his newfound engagement to her sister and increasingly close relationship with her family as a way of getting at her. Her family become close to Brendan; in particular her younger, bipolar brother Troy (Robert Daniel Lowe). When Troy commits suicide, Miranda's concerns about Brendan are strengthened.

Brendan then dumps Kerry for her best friend, Laura, whom he marries. Three months later, Laura contacts Miranda, suggesting they talk. Miranda waits at a pub for her, but Brendan arrives and accuses her of meddling in his marriage. After an argument, Miranda goes to check on Laura and discovers her dead body. Brendan is suspected of killing his wife, but a prosecution is not made due to lack of evidence.

Miranda becomes obsessed with proving Brendan's guilt. She tracks down Brendan, who is living with a new girlfriend named Naomi. Miranda attempts to warn Naomi about Brendan's violent nature, but she is thrown out by Brendan. He takes out an injunction on Miranda, accusing her of harassment. Receiving a call from Naomi shortly after, Miranda goes to the apartment not knowing it is a setup by Brendan in order to have her arrested. Naomi contacts Miranda from outside, telling her to leave, and Miranda narrowly escapes Brendan and the police. Naomi tells Miranda that Brendan became violent and she feared for her safety.

After deciding that Naomi would be safe staying with Kerry, Miranda returns to her flat. That night, Brendan arrives and angrily searches for Naomi, to no avail. He says that Miranda pushed him into doing some things he wouldn't usually do before raping her.

The next day, a colleague of Miranda's finds the flat in disarray, as well as blood and tape in the bathroom. Upon the conclusion that Miranda has been murdered, an investigation ensues with Brendan as the prime suspect. Naomi finds a set of bloodied keys in Brendan's suit pocket and hands it in to the police. Brendan is arrested for Miranda's murder and sentenced to life imprisonment.

Six months later, Miranda's family receive three plane tickets from Naomi, asking them to come to Australia, where she now resides. When they arrive, they meet Naomi at the airport and see Miranda.

A flashback explains that Miranda and Naomi planned to drug Brendan by slipping a pill into his glass the night he arrived at the flat. Naomi is shown drawing blood from Miranda, which Miranda then spreads around the bathroom after Brendan slips unconscious. She plants his fingerprints onto his set of keys which have been smeared with her blood. Then, posing as Laura, Miranda flees England to Australia to stay with Naomi's parents until Brendan is arrested.

After putting Brendan away, Miranda pauses to think about her brother Troy, who is the only person missing at the table where she and her family are happily eating.

== Cast ==
- Miranda Cotton — Kate Ashfield
- Brendan Block — David Tennant
- Kerry Cotton — Claire Goose
- Naomi Stone — Keira Malik
- Laura — Susannah Wise
- Troy Cotton — Robert Daniel Lowe
- Marcia Cotton — Jill Baker
- Derek Cotton — John Bowe

== Broadcast ==
The serial was broadcast in the United States on BBC America as part of Mystery Mondays: Crimes of Passion.
