= House of Salem =

2016 film directed by James Crow

- Theatrical release poster
- Directed by: James Crow
- Written by: James Crow
- Produced by: James Crow; Julie Donaghey; Paul Jones; James Sibley; Steve Thomas
- Starring: Jessica Arterton; Jack Brett Anderson; Liam Kelly; Robert Daniel Lowe; Leslie Mills; Andrew-Lee Potts
- Cinematography: Sam Creamer; James Crow
- Edited by: Sam Creamer; James Crow
- Music by: Pete Coleman
- Production company: Last British Dragon
- Distributed by: Last British Dragon
- Release dates: August 27, 2016 (Frightfest); January 23, 2018 (United States)
- Running time: 100 minutes
- Country: United Kingdom
- Language: English

House of Salem is a 2016 British horror-thriller film written and directed by James Crow. It stars Jessica Arterton, Jack Brett Anderson, Liam Kelly, Robert Daniel Lowe, Leslie Mills and Andrew-Lee Potts. The film premiered at the London FrightFest Film Festival on August 27, 2016.

== Plot ==
A group of criminals, Jacob, Nancy, Jack, Mick, and Craig are hired to kidnap a young boy named Josh from his home. They take him to a large, isolated country mansion, believing they are holding him for ransom. However, they soon realize that something is terribly wrong. The house has a dark history, and their employers have sinister motives.

Josh, a quiet boy with mysterious psychic abilities, warns the group that the house is evil. He begins to exhibit knowledge about the kidnappers’ personal pasts details he couldn’t possibly know on his own. Tensions rise among the group as strange, supernatural events begin to occur in the mansion. Ghostly visions, voices, and violent hallucinations haunt them as the night progresses.

It becomes clear that the house is connected to a satanic cult, and the kidnapping was part of a ritual sacrifice. Hooded cultists arrive at the mansion, attempting to complete the ceremony using Josh. As the criminals are hunted down one by one, they begin to understand that they are not the true villains of the story, but pawns in a demonic plan that spans generations.

Nancy grows particularly close to Josh and fights to protect him. The group faces supernatural forces and the murderous cult as they try to survive the night and rescue the boy. In the end, the lines between good and evil blur, as the house consumes those who enter, feeding on their sins and secrets.

== Cast ==
- Jessica Anterton as Nancy
- Jack Brett Anderson as Jack
- Liam Kelly as Josh
- Leslie Mills as Jacob (as Les Mills)
- Robert Daniel Lowe as Mick
- Andrew-Lee Potts as Mr. Drowning
- Dean Maskell as Craig
- Anna Nightingale as Mrs. Drowning
- Tony Fadil as Lord Arthur Salem

== Release ==
The film was premiered at the London FrightFest Film Festival on August 27, 2016 and released in the United States on January 23, 2018.

== Reception ==
Norman Gidney of Film Threat rate the film 2 out of 4 rating and wrote: House of Salem may not be the mix of House of the Devil and Don't Breathe that it aims to be but there are enough interesting ideas to make you sit up and take notice. Joel Harley of Starburst gave the film a rating of 3 out of 10 rating and said: House of Salem is more technically accomplished than most low-budget British horror films, but it's failures drop the ball so hard that it can never hope to recover. It's not scary, clever or atmospheric enough to cover for the actors' atrocious line readings and lack of presence.

Matt Hudson of Horrornews.net wrote:

When settling in to watch a horror movie about which you know nothing, it can be a very good thing if you find yourself 10 minutes or more into the flick, and you start to wonder if this really IS a horror movie. House of Salem does that by giving you a supernatural type opening that quickly morphs into a home invasion/kidnapping. And things lock fairly tightly on that crime drama thread, for a while.
