= Jonah Lehrer =

American science writer (born 1981)

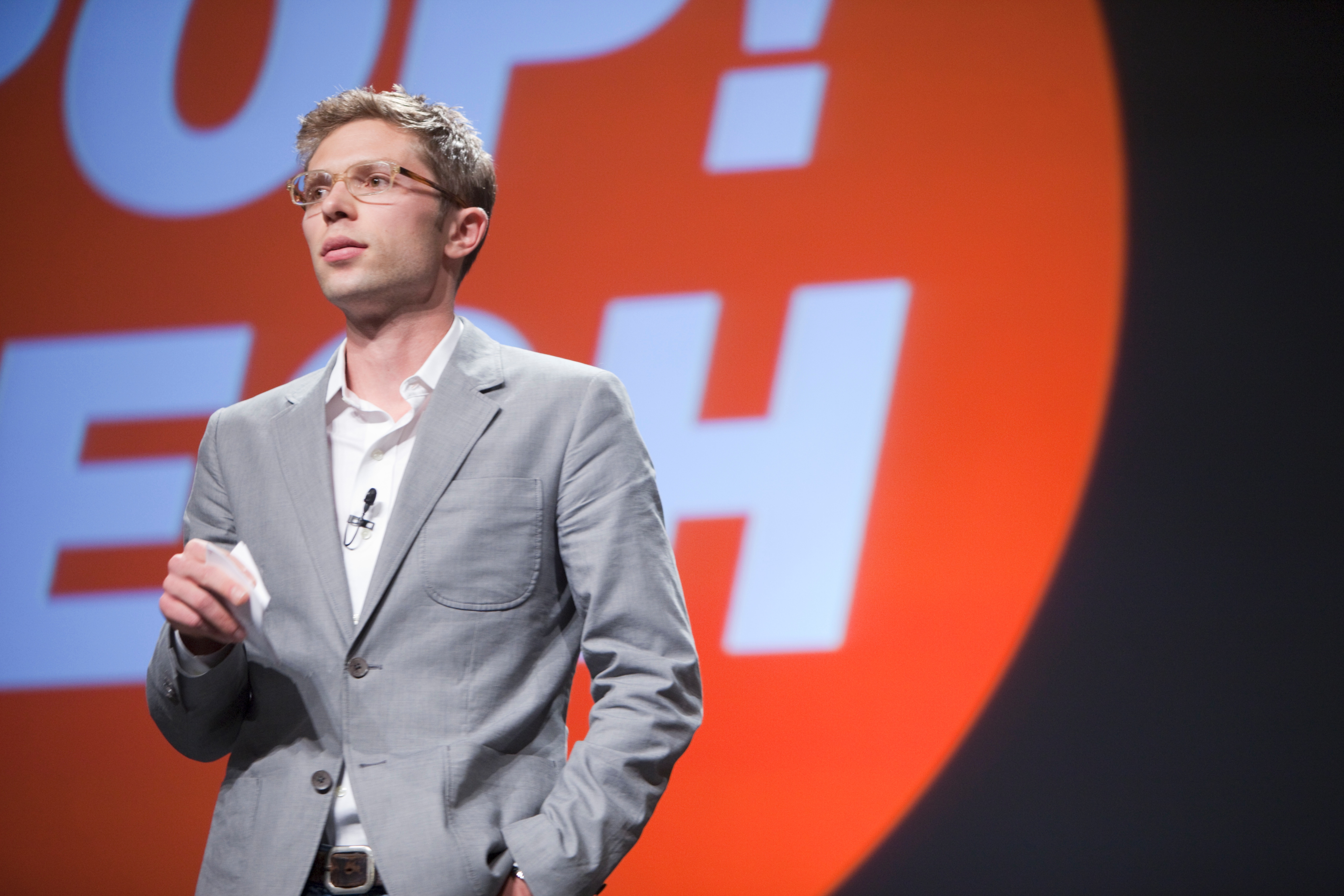
- Lehrer in 2009
- Born: Jonah Richard Lehrer; June 25, 1981 (age 45); Los Angeles, California, U.S.
- Education: Columbia University, Wolfson College, Oxford
- Occupations: Blogger; author; journalist
- Spouse: Sarah Liebowitz (m. 2008)
- Children: 2
- Writing career
- Period: 2007–present
- Genre: Popular science
- Subject: Behavioural neuroscience
- Notable works: Proust Was a Neuroscientist (HMH, 2007); How we Decide (HMH, 2009; recalled 2012); Imagine: How Creativity Works (HMH, 2012; recalled 2013)

Jonah Richard Lehrer (born June 25, 1981) is an American author and blogger. Lehrer studied neuroscience at Columbia University and was a Rhodes Scholar. Thereafter, he built a media career that integrated science and humanities content to address broad aspects of human behaviour. Between 2007 and 2012 Lehrer published three non-fiction books that became best-sellers, and also wrote regularly for The New Yorker and Wired.com.

Starting in 2012, Lehrer was discovered to have routinely recycled his earlier work and fabricated or misused quotations and facts, and was alleged to have plagiarized from colleagues. Scrutiny began when freelance journalist Michael Moynihan identified multiple fabrications in Lehrer's third book, Imagine: How Creativity Works (2012), including six quotations attributed to musician Bob Dylan. Imagine and Lehrer's earlier book How We Decide (2009) were recalled after a publisher's internal review found significant problems in that material. He was also fired from The New Yorker and Wired. In 2016, Lehrer published A Book About Love, to negative reviews.

== Early life, education, employment ==
Jonah Richard Lehrer was born on June 25, 1981, in the Los Feliz neighborhood of Los Angeles. His mother, Ariella (born Jean Hively), a developer of educational software, converted to Judaism to marry his father, David Lehrer, a civil rights lawyer.

Lehrer graduated from North Hollywood High School. When he was 15, he won $1,000 in an essay contest run by NASDAQ. In 2000, he worked as a line chef at the Midtown Manhattan restaurants Le Cirque and Le Bernardin.

Lehrer majored in neuroscience at Columbia University. While an undergraduate, he worked in the laboratory of Eric Kandel, "examining the biological process of memory and what happens in the brain on a molecular level when a person remembers or forgets information". He appears on one published paper from that laboratory, as fourth of eight authors on a primary report in a three-laboratory collaborative genetics study characterizing homologs of the human DYRK1A gene from model organism C. elegans, a gene believed to "play a significant role in the neuropathology of Down syndrome".

While at Columbia, Lehrer also contributed to the Columbia Review, and was its editor for two years. He tied for second place for the Dean Hawkes Memorial Prize in the Humanities. Lehrer was a 2003 Rhodes Scholarship recipient, supporting his study at Wolfson College at Oxford University; while he is reported to have planned to study "philosophy, physiology and psychology", he is further reported to have instead studied 20th century literature and philosophy.

== Writing career ==
=== Print and online periodicals ===
Lehrer has written for The New Yorker (July 2008-March 2012; staff writer June 2012), Wired (July 2010-June 2012) Scientific American Mind (June 2008-July 2009), Grantland, The Wall Street Journal, and The Boston Globe, as well as the journal Nature, and Seed magazine.

Lehrer was a contributing editor for a variety of publications, including Scientific American Mind (2009-2012) and Radiolab (2007-2012, 38 episodes).

Lehrer resigned from The New Yorker on July 30, 2012, after accusations of fabricated Bob Dylan quotes in Imagine surfaced. On August 31, 2012, Wired.com's editor-in-chief, Evan Hansen, stating Lehrer's "failure to meet ... editorial standards", severed the relationship between that venue and the writer.

=== Books ===
Lehrer is the author of three best-selling books: Proust Was a Neuroscientist (2007), How We Decide (2009), and Imagine: How Creativity Works (2012). The latter two books were withdrawn from the market by their publishers after "internal review uncovered significant problems" with the books. These and other work by Lehrer were characterized as having misused quotes and facts, plagiarized press releases and authored work, and to have otherwise recycled earlier published work. These acts and the process of uncovering them are recounted in So You've Been Publicly Shamed by Jon Ronson.

==== In print ====
Proust Was a Neuroscientist is a collection of biographical essays on creative figures such as Marcel Proust, Paul Cézanne, Walt Whitman, and Auguste Escoffier.

Chris McManus, professor of psychology and medical education, University College London, writing in Nature, opens his review, saying "'Oh no he wasn't!' might well be the response to ... Lehrer's claim ... ," continuing with "Lehrer's conceit of the artist as a neuroscientist is not unique" (University of London Semir Zeki and Dartmouth's Patrick Cavanaugh having preceded him with the general point), that the "impressions [of artists] are neither experiments nor science" and that the "conceit remains exactly that, if the term 'neuroscientist' is to retain any serious meaning". McManus goes on to quote Lehrer, with this analysis:

What did Proust learn from [the] prophetic crumbs of sugar, flour, and butter [Lehrer asks]? He actually intuited a lot about the structure of our brain." These intuitions included "smell and taste are the only senses that connect directly to the hippocampus, the center of the brain's long-term memory, [whereas] all other senses are first processed by the thalamus, the source of language and the front door to consciousness." [McManus concludes:] If indeed Proust intuited this anatomy, it was unfortunate because the taste pathway is wrong, and few regard the thalamus as the source of language ...

On a more positive note, McManus notes that "The most interesting parts of Proust ... are its manifestos on art and science in the prelude and coda" that begins with C.P. Snow; however, Lehrer proceeds (McManus notes) with "attacks" on Richard Dawkins, Brian Greene, Steven Pinker and E. O. Wilson for failing to engage in a "dialogue of equals" with nonscientists. McManus closes, stating that while Lehrer's notion of a "fourth culture" is a "grand dream", his "attempt at [it] fails" since the neuroscience laid out by Lehrer "seems 'sheer plod', undermining the central conceit—for what artist would partake in such a paltry matter?"

Nonscientists, on the other hand, mostly offered praise for Proust. Science journalist and Guggenheim Fellow D. T. Max described it for The New York Times as "a precocious and engaging book that tries to mend the century-old tear between the literary and scientific cultures". The review by music critic Helen Brown in The Telegraph stated, "Lehrer is a dazzlingly clever young man whose writing bears witness to both the clarity of his scientific training and the humanity of his literary studies. The Whitmanesque electricity of all the thought and heart he has put into this book fizzes from each sentence." Jonathon Keats at Salon, writing as an artist, approached the "conceit" noted by McManus from the opposing perspective, and described Proust as being written "arbitrarily and often inaccurately".

On June 6, 2013, Simon & Schuster announced that it would publish a book by Lehrer with the working title The Book of Love. In Slate.com, Daniel Engber suggested that Lehrer might have plagiarized portions of his book proposal from the work of his former New Yorker colleague Adam Gopnik. Both had written about the same episode in the life of Darwin, using the same biography (that of Desmond and Moore) as a source. The book was published as A Book About Love in 2016. Reviewing it in The New York Times, Jennifer Senior described it as "a nonfiction McMuffin" and "insolently unoriginal," containing "a lot of dime-store counsel" and "a series of duckpin arguments, just waiting to be knocked down." She concluded, "Perhaps Mr. Lehrer has changed—personally. But not sufficiently as a writer. I fear it may be time, at long last, for him to find something else to do."

==== Withdrawn ====
In How We Decide, Lehrer argued that two main parts of the brain are involved in decision-making, the rational and the emotional. Steven Berlin Johnson, a technology writer with training in semiotics and English literature, reviewed How We Decide for The New York Times long before its withdrawal from market during the Imagine fabrication scandal, where he wrote,

Explaining decision-making on the scale of neurons makes for a challenging task, but Lehrer handles it with confidence and grace. As an introduction to the cognitive struggle between the brain's 'executive' rational centers and its more intuitive regions, How We Decide succeeds with great panache.

Adam Kepecs, however, writing in the journal Nature called portions of the book into question based on current understanding of neuroscience. For instance, Kepecs noted that "Lehrer's insistence on attributing decisions to either an emotional brain or a rational one" was "problematic" because there "is no evidence that the brain has distinct and opposing emotional and rational regions." Kepecs laments that Lehrer's writing is "neurobabble [which] has unfortunately become commonplace in science journalism."

Before it was pulled from the shelves by publisher Houghton Mifflin Harcourt (HMH), Imagine: How Creativity Works was on the Los Angeles Times' hardcover nonfiction bestseller list for 22 weeks. Michiko Kakutani of The New York Times called Lehrer adept for Imagine's "teasing out ... social and economic implications of scientific theories while commuting easily among the realms of science, business and art ..." noting that "[h]e deconstructs the creative process behind a Bob Dylan song with the same verve he brings to the story of how Procter & Gamble created the Swiffer, its New Age mop. ... " But Christopher Chabris, writing in The New York Times Book Review, derided Imagine for its "many elementary errors" and formulaic approach, as well as for "Lehrer's failure to grasp some fundamental principles of scientific thinking". A review by Michael S. Roth in The Washington Post said, "Lehrer practices what he preaches, showing an appetite for learning, a determined effort to cross fields and disciplines, and a delight in exploring new possibilities," while Isaac Chotiner of The New Republic described Imagine as inaccurate, simplistic, and glib, and concluded, "Lehrer writes self-help for people who would be embarrassed to be seen reading it."

== Plagiarism and quote fabrication scandal ==
=== Findings of self-plagiarism ===
On June 19, 2012, Joe Coscarelli of New York magazine and Josh Levin of Slate reported that five posts by Lehrer on The New Yorker blog had reused significant, identical portions of his own work without acknowledging having done so, referring to the practice as "self-plagiarism". Additionally, Edward Champion reported that portions of Imagine: How Creativity Works had been published previously in various forms by Lehrer, and that he had subsequently re-used parts of his books, unattributed, in further submitted publications, e.g.,

- [Lehrer's] Proust Was a Neuroscientist (2007), p. 185:

The most mysterious thing about the human brain is that the more we know about it, the deeper our own mystery becomes.

- [Lehrer's] Review of Out of Our Heads, by Alva Noë. San Francisco Chronicle (March 1, 2009):

The most mysterious thing about the human brain is that the more we know about it, the deeper our own mystery becomes.

All five of The New Yorker blog posts now appear on the magazine's website with editor's notes listing where Lehrer had previously published related sentences, a list that included The Wall Street Journal, The Boston Globe, Wired, and The Guardian. In a response soon after, a spokesperson for Lehrer's publisher, Houghton Mifflin Harcourt (HMH), stated: "[Lehrer] owns the rights to the relevant articles, so no permission was needed. He will add language to the acknowledgments noting his prior work." Lehrer apologized for this unattributed reuse of his own work. In a related matter, a correction was appended to a January 30, 2012, article by Lehrer on The New Yorker website, noting that quotations published in the original version of that article had been taken from the work of another writer, Peter Dizikes, at another publication, the MIT Technology Review (i.e., without permission or attribution).

=== Imagine fabrications, The New Yorker resignation ===
The seriousness of the disclosures then escalated. Some weeks later, Michael C. Moynihan reported in Tablet Magazine that Lehrer had fabricated quotes attributed to singer Bob Dylan in his book Imagine: How Creativity Works. Moynihan discussed his discovery at length with Mark Colvin, host of Australia's ABC News' program Friday Late. Moynihan noted later that the quotations immediately sounded phony to him when he read the book: They "sounded like a Dylan self-help book", leading him to seek clarification from Lehrer and Dylan's manager. In a subsequent statement, Lehrer admitted, "The quotes in question either did not exist, were unintentional misquotations, or represented improper combinations of previously existing quotes." He also acknowledged having initially lied about the sources for these quotes to Moynihan when first confronted about them.

At a Moth storytelling event, Jonah Lehrer said "I'd been a lifelong Dylan fan and was familiar with approximate versions of what he'd said, so I put in those approximations to make it sound better, as if I'd actually done my homework. And then I forgot they were there."

In the wake of plagiarism revelations Lehrer resigned from The New Yorker on July 30, 2012, less than two months after he had joined the staff. Several scheduled speaking engagements were cancelled. In the days and weeks that followed, reporting on the scope of the issues, and related criticism, continued. Colleen Curry of ABC News in the U.S. compared Lehrer in mid-July to "Publishing's ... Notorious Offenders", Janet Cooke, Stephen Glass, and Jayson Blair.

=== Recall of Imagine ===
Lehrer's publisher for Imagine and for his two other major works, Houghton Mifflin Harcourt, announced that unsold print copies of the book would be recalled and sales of e-books would be suspended. HMH was subsequently reported, in early August, to have placed all of Lehrer's books that they had published under an internal review.

=== Broadened review and consequences ===
On July 31, 2012, New York Public Radio issued a statement that described Lehrer "a talented and valued colleague." The statement also expressed that the station was "deeply saddened by the news" of the preceding week and further addressed Lehrer's role as a contributing editor between 2007 and 2012. The statement suggested that his work at this NPR venue was untainted, because of their applied journalistic oversight:

Jonah Lehrer has been a regular contributor to Radiolab as an "explainer", making technical science more accessible and bringing much needed meaning to new scientific research. He has been a lively and compelling voice and has helped make the history of science come alive for listeners. ... Radiolab has not used Jonah as a standalone authority on any topic within an episode. Rather, he has brought new research to the attention of the program and the producers in turn have interviewed primary sources and researchers, weaving the voices together as part of a choir—a style of reporting that defines Radiolab. Since Jonah has not been in the role of reporter for Radiolab and we have employed standard practices of journalism in producing the episodes, we have no reason to believe his work with Radiolab is compromised. But we will review the work as needed.

The final episode to which Lehrer is seen to contribute, "The 'Decline Effect' and Scientific Truth", aired on June 29, 2012. It contains a comment indicating audio editing to make two corrections to content. One is a factual quantitative statement. The other is an attribution of a quote without reference to any individual at the program bearing responsibility.

On August 10, 2012, Steve Myers at Poynter.org reported that a quotation from the magician Teller of the performance duo Penn and Teller that had been included in Imagine was inaccurate, but that a previous version of the quote, which Lehrer had used for a 2009 Wired magazine article, had been accurate. In the wake of the disclosures, Wired.com asked journalism professor Charles Seife to investigate Lehrer's posts to its website. Writing in Slate.com (after Wired.com declined to publish his findings), Seife stated that he had found 17 of a sample of 18 Lehrer posts to contain rampant, longstanding recycled work, as well as plagiarism of press releases and of authored work, and issues with misuse of quotes and facts. He summarized his findings in this way:

I am convinced that Lehrer has a cavalier attitude about truth and falsehood. This shows not only in his attitude toward quotations but in some of the other details of his writing. And a journalist who repeatedly fails to correct errors when they're pointed out is, in my opinion, exhibiting reckless disregard for the truth. / It is thus my opinion that Lehrer plagiarized others' work, published inaccurate quotations, printed narrative details that were factually incorrect, and failed to address errors when they were pointed out.

On August 31, 2012, Wired.com's editor-in-chief, Evan Hansen, announced that Wired.com had cut ties with Lehrer. Hansen wrote that while Lehrer's blog had not been subject to fact checking, Wired.com expected all work published under its banner to meet its standards. For that reason, "Lehrer's failure to meet WIRED editorial standards leaves us no choice but to sever the relationship."

As well, Lehrer lost many scheduled speaking engagements, including addresses to the Holmes Report's Global Public Relations Summit and Iowa State University's College of Engineering; a ticketed book signing at the Aliso Creek Inn in Laguna Beach, California; and an appearance as a part of the Robert Simpson Charles Lectureship in Ethics at Earlham College.

In The New Republic, Isaac Chotiner gave a mostly negative review to Imagine in June 2012. He accused Lehrer of grossly oversimplifying complicated scientific issues and habitually using "slippery language", such as treating creativity and imagination as synonyms when they actually describe different phenomena. After the revelations about Lehrer's plagiarism and falsification of data, Chotiner revisited Imagine in 2013:

If I had known of Lehrer's deceptions before writing my piece, I would have tried to argue that the book would have been just as absurd and nonsensical even if every word of it had been true. ... The fact that such a shoddy piece of work could be written by such an ostensibly serious writer is somehow more disturbing than the knowledge that an overconfident journalist invented several quotes.

=== Ronson's So You've Been Publicly Shamed ===
The controversy surrounding Lehrer's misuse of Bob Dylan quotes in Imagine and his February 2013 speech to the Knight Foundation feature heavily in Jon Ronson's 2015 book, So You've Been Publicly Shamed. Drawing from his research into the history of public shaming, Ronson argues that the public humiliation that followed the discovery of Lehrer's journalistic malpractice was excessive even by 18th century standards. Slate.com journalist Daniel Engber disagreed, arguing that the media has not been "too hard". In assessing Ronson's book in March 2015, Engber argues that Lehrer's Knight Foundation apology (see above) and Ronson's view of Lehrer's actions and of the apology fail to address the full scope of Lehrer's malpractices; Engber states,

Lehrer's transgressions went much deeper. In Imagine, he didn't just make up quotes from Bob Dylan; he twisted words and reversed their meanings. (Per Moynihan, for example, he suggests that Dylan had "tantrums of genius" and started tearing up his papers when his writing wasn't going well. In context, though, that phrase from Marianne Faithfull, quoted in a Dylan book called Behind the Shades, refers not to the singer's writer's block but to his sexual frustration.) Lehrer also made up quotes from W. H. Auden and Raymond Teller, and misrepresented their beliefs. He plagiarized widely. (Among the victims seems to have been his erstwhile colleague Malcolm Gladwell.) Lehrer's publisher hired fact-checkers to look closely at the book, and subsequently pulled remaining copies from the shelves.

Engber concludes that Lehrer's catalogue of inaccuracy "wasn't sloppiness or a rash of dumb mistakes. At best, it was a systematic disregard for journalistic ethics. At worst, it was calculated fraud."

=== Affirmation of Proust, recall of How We Decide ===
By March 2013, Lehrer's publisher HMH determined that his first book, Proust Was a Neuroscientist (2007), had no significant problems and would remain in print. However, adding to the mounting disgrace of the Imagine recall and severed ties with The New Yorker and Wired.com, Lehrer's publisher announced at the same time that his second book, How We Decide (2009) would also be pulled.

=== Apologies ===
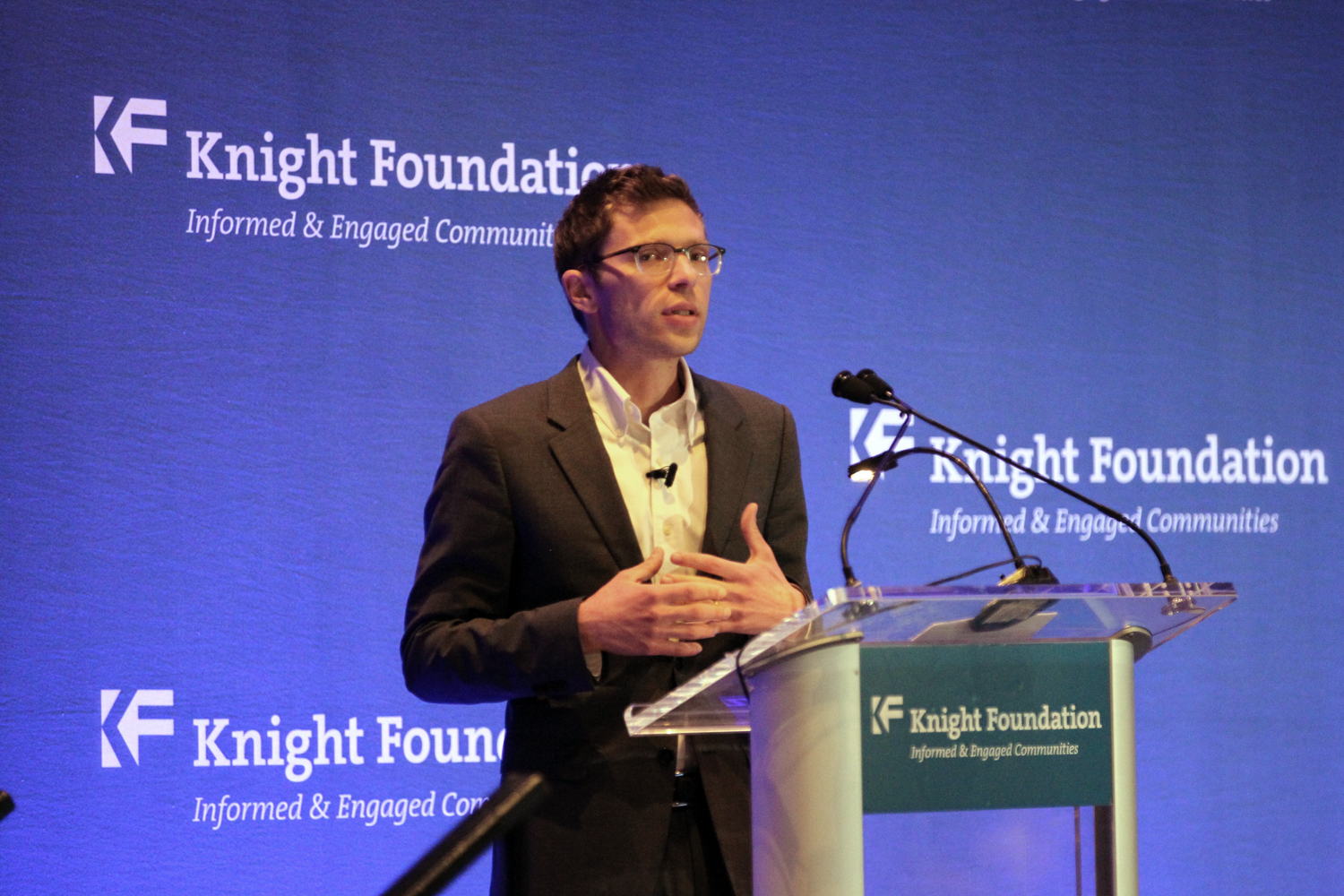
Lehrer at his February 2013 Knight Foundation paid apology speech, which drew significant media disapprobation

On February 12, 2013, Lehrer gave a paid speech to the John S. and James L. Knight Foundation entitled "My Apology." His speech included the following content:

I'm the author of a book on creativity that contained several fabricated Bob Dylan quotes. I committed plagiarism on my blog, taking without credit or citation an entire paragraph from the blog of Christian Jarrett. I plagiarized from myself. I lied to a journalist named Michael Moynihan to cover up the Dylan fabrications.

Lehrer also announced plans to continue writing, and spoke of potential safeguards to prevent similar lapses in judgment and accuracy from recurring; at one point he stated, "I need rules."

Various media commentators have criticized the speech, arguing that Lehrer did not express sufficient regret and finding Lehrer's attempts to use neuroscience to discuss his conduct evasive and misleading. Daniel Engber wrote in Slate that the speech "was couched in elaborate and perplexing disavowals". Joseph Nocera of The New York Times wrote that "As apologies go, it was both arrogant and pathetic." Michael Moynihan, who broke the Imagine fabrication story, described it as "a string of Gladwellian bullshit". The day after the speech, the foundation acknowledged that paying Lehrer was a mistake. In 2015, Lehrer continued offering apologia for his misconduct at student fora, for which he does not receive honoraria, according to a report in the Fresno State University student publication, The Collegian. At one such forum at Fresno State, Lehrer stated that his large workload led to "very serious mistakes. I was taking on more projects than I could handle." With regard to the Dylan quotes he admits to having fabricated, Lehrer specifically cited the pressure he felt from the deadline to finish Imagine. Lehrer now states that he "records all his interviews for reference" and "sends interview subjects the quotes he plans to use".

== Further projects and news ==
In March 2014, Lehrer began to post blog entries on the scientific subjects that interested him at jonahlehrer.net. In the opening post, "Welcome to my blog", Lehrer thanks his readers, expresses the desire to regain their trust, and indicates that "when possible, all material will be sent to the relevant researchers for their approval. If that's not possible, an independent fact-checker will review it."

In November 2014, the Associated Press (AP) announced that Portfolio, an imprint of Random House, had acquired rights to a work, then titled The Digital Mind: How We Think and Behave Differently on Screens. It was to be "co-written by Lehrer and Shlomo Benartzi", the latter a behavioural economist, and professor and co-chair of the Behavioral Decision-Making Group at the UCLA Anderson School of Management. Adrian Zackheim of Portfolio was reported by AP as stating that while "[n]o responsible publisher could entirely overlook his past mistakes ... the prospect of working with him was also fantastically appealing," and as describing Lehrer as "one of the most gifted nonfiction writers of his generation".

The early characterization of the proposed work proved to be inaccurate with regard to the eventual book that was released. Business professor Benartzi is involved with a new Portfolio title that involves Lehrer, entitled The Smarter Screen: Surprising Ways to Influence and Improve Online Behavior (alternative subtitle, What Your Business Can Learn from the Way Consumers Think Online); Lehrer is listed as a contributor, rather than a co-author—Carlos Lozada of The Washington Post notes that Lehrer's name appears on the cover "in far smaller type size than Benartzi's name". Lehrer is described by the publisher as "a science writer living in Los Angeles", and only Benartzi's photograph appears on the jacket.

== Personal life ==
In 2008 Lehrer married journalist Sarah Liebowitz. The couple has two children. Lehrer bought the historic Shulman House in Los Angeles in 2010.

== Bibliography ==
=== Books ===
- Proust Was a Neuroscientist. Boston: Houghton Mifflin Harcourt. 2007. ISBN 9780618620104.
- How We Decide. Boston: Houghton Mifflin Harcourt. 2009. ISBN 9780618620111.
- Imagine: How Creativity Works. Boston: Houghton Mifflin Harcourt. 2012. ISBN 9780670064557.
- Benartzi, Shlomo; Jonah Lehrer (2015). The Smarter Screen: Surprising Ways to Influence and Improve Online Behaviour. New York, NY: Penguin-Portfolio. ISBN 9781591847861.
  - Also appearing as The Smarter Screen: What Your Business Can Learn from the Way Consumers Think Online. London: Piatkus-Little Brown. 2015. ISBN 9780349410395. Both releases, October 6.
- A Book About Love. Simon & Schuster. 2016. ISBN 9781476761411.
- Mystery: A Seduction, A Strategy, A Solution. Simon & Schuster. 2021. ISBN 9781501195877.

=== Essays and reporting ===
- "Groupthink". Annals of Ideas. The New Yorker. 87 (46): 22–27. January 30, 2012.

== See also ==
- Journalistic scandal
