= The Making of a Marchioness =

1901 novel by Frances Hodgson Burnett

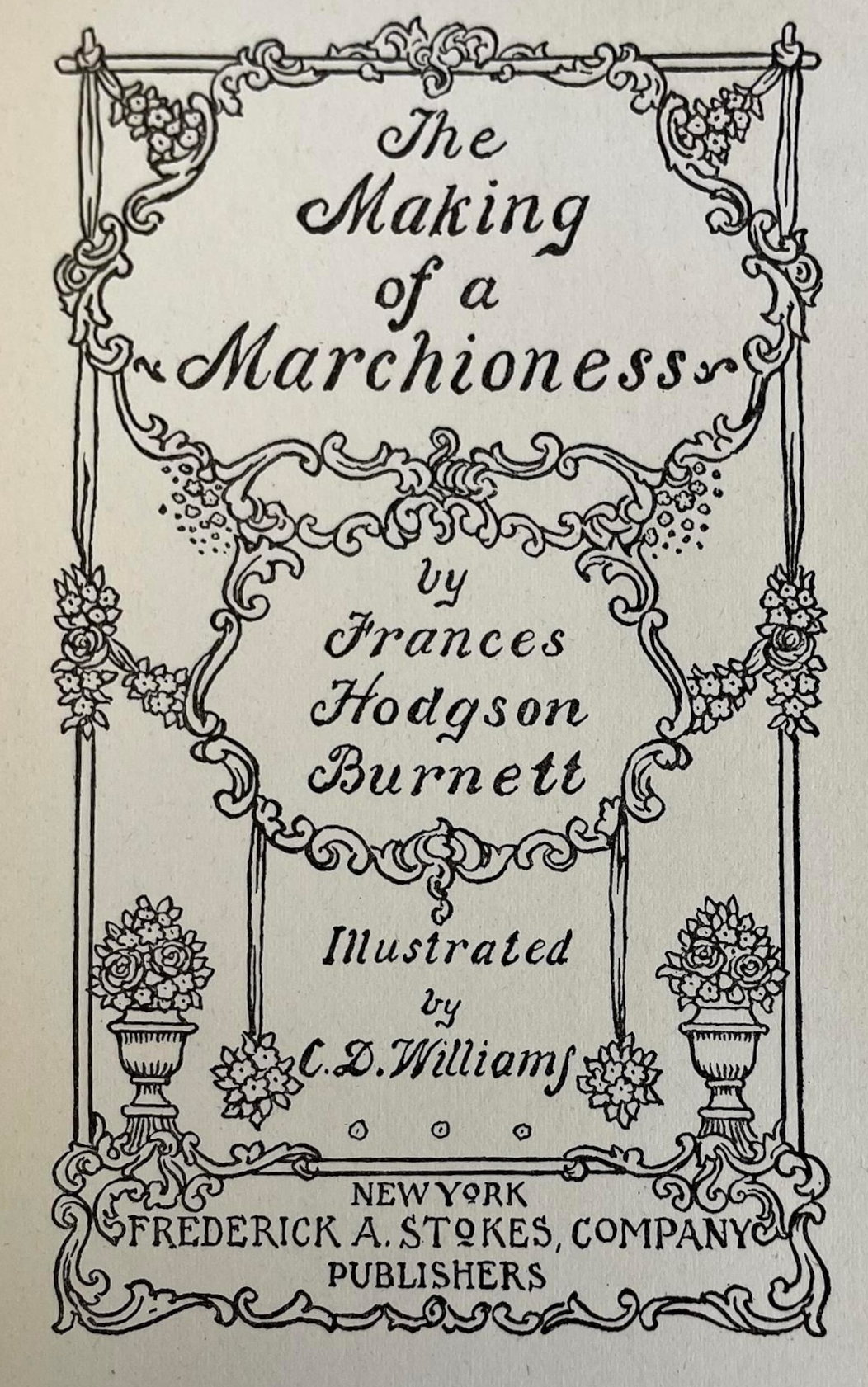
- Author: Frances Hodgson Burnett
- Language: English
- Published: 1901

The Making of a Marchioness is a 1901 novel by Frances Hodgson Burnett, followed by a sequel, The Methods of Lady Walderhurst. Subsequent editions published the two books together, either under the original name The Making of a Marchioness or as Emily Fox-Seton. The collected version was republished by Persephone Books in 2007, and it was then adapted for radio and television.

== Plot summary ==
Emily Fox-Seton is a woman of "good birth" but no money who had worked as a lady's companion and now assists various members of the upper class with day-to-day practical matters. As the novel opens, she is 34 years old, living in a small room in a lodging house in an unfashionable area of London. Her chief employer is Lady Maria Bayne, who is both very selfish and very funny, although she does come to care for Emily. In a Cinderella-like twist, Emily marries a man twenty years her senior, James, the Marquess of Walderhurst, thus becoming a marchioness. In the sequel, originally The Methods of Lady Walderhurst, Emily has Walderhurst's child, and his former heir, Alec Osborn, attempts to regain what he sees as his birthright.

== Publication history ==
The Making of a Marchioness and The Methods of Lady Walderhurst were originally published in 1901, while Burnett was also working on a longer and more complicated novel, The Shuttle. Both books were republished in 2007 as The Making of a Marchioness by Persephone Books.

== Adaptations ==
In 2007, The Making of a Marchioness was made into a BBC Radio 4 Classic Serial, dramatised by Michelene Wandor, directed by Chris Wallis, and featuring Charles Dance as Lord Walderhurst, Miriam Margolyes as Lady Walderhurst, Lucy Briers as Emily, Joanna David as the narrator, Anjali Jay as Hester, and Amara Karan as Lady Agatha. The Radio Times called the radio adaptation a "delightful and occasionally dark romance."

In 2012, the television film The Making of a Lady was created based on the book. Kate Brooke wrote the screenplay adaptation, and Richard Curson Smith directed. Lydia Wilson starred as Emily, Linus Roache as Lord James Walderhurst, Joanna Lumley as Lady Maria Byrne, and James D’Arcy as Captain Alec Osborn. The film premiered in 2012 on ITV in Britain and was subsequently broadcast on PBS in the United States in 2014.
