= Pinochet in Suburbia =

2006 British film

Pinochet in Suburbia (retitled Pinochet's Last Stand for US release) is a 2006 drama about former Chilean dictator Augusto Pinochet and the attempts to extradite him from Great Britain during his visit there in 1998 for medical treatment. It was written and directed by Richard Curson Smith.

Pinochet was played by Derek Jacobi, Margaret Thatcher by Anna Massey and Pinochet's wife Lucía by Phyllida Law, with the cast also including Peter Capaldi, Pip Torrens and Jessica Hynes. It premiered in March 2006 on BBC Two and in September 2007 in the US.
