= Kate Brooke =

British screenwriter

Kate Brooke (born Kate Constantia Sergison-Brooke; 1 June 1968) is a British screenwriter best known for The Forsyte Saga (2002), Wired (2008), Mr Selfridge (2013–16) and The Winter King (2023).

== Early life and education ==
Brooke is the daughter of Timothy Mark Sergison-Brooke and Mary Anne Hare. She’s the granddaughter of John Hugh Hare, the first Viscount Blakenham, and Bertram Sergison-Brooke. The Brookes are a prominent Anglo-Irish family, descending from the English Army captain Basil Brooke, that settled in Northern Ireland before the Plantation of Ulster.

Brooke attended the University of Oxford, England, and graduated with a degree in English studies, following which she enrolled in L'École Internationale de Théâtre Jacques Lecoq, Paris. Before becoming a television writer, she set up her own theatre group in England.

== Career ==
In the early years of her career, Brooke wrote and directed for theatre. She worked on the stage adaptation of François Mauriac’s Thérèse Desqueyroux (Turtle Key Arts Centre in Fulham, London; 1992), Guy de Maupassant’s Bel Ami (Turtle Key Arts Centre in Fulham, London; 1993), Graham Greene’s The Tenth Man (New End Theatre in Hampstead, London; 1994) and Saki’s Beasts and Super-Beasts.

Brooke's first television writing credit was on an episode of the British sketch comedy show Six Pairs of Pants (1995). She wrote six episodes of the Always and Everyone (1999–2002) and four episodes of The Forsyte Saga (2003). With Terry Winsor, she co-wrote Danielle Cable: Eyewitness, a true crime film based on the 1996 murder of Stephen Cameron in a road rage incident; Cameron’s fiancé, the sole witness, was forced to enter witness protection after providing evidence that helped convict Kenneth Noye. The film was screened on the third anniversary of Noye's conviction and was nominated for the BAFTA TV Award for Best Single Drama.

Brooke wrote the screenplay for Secret Smile (2003) based on Nicci French's novel of the same name. She wrote the Australian television film Joanne Lees: Murder in the Outback (2007) that follows the real life disappearance of Peter Falconio. In 2008, she was the writer on three episodes of Wired.

Brooke wrote Breaking the Mould (2009), a historical drama film about the team of University of Oxford scientists who developed penicillin. She adapted Frances Hodgson Burnett’s The Making of a Marchioness for the 2012 television film The Making of a Lady starring Joanna Lumley, Linus Roache and James D’Arcy. Sonia Saraiya of The AV Club called the made-for-TV adaptation “a bizarrely disjointed costume drama” featuring "racist" depictions of Hindus as “practitioners of black magic.”

Brooke wrote on three episodes of The Ice Cream Girls (2013). She co-wrote three seasons of Mr Selfridge (2013–16), a British period drama about Harry Gordon Selfridge, with Andrew Davies and was the showrunner for the second and third season. She adapted and served as the showrunner on the first season of A Discovery of Witches (2018). She was the writer and showrunner on the first two seasons of Bancroft (2017–2020).

In 2022, Brooke was announced as the screenwriter and showrunner for the television adaptation of Erin Young’s The Fields. Together with Ed Whitmore, she was brought in to adapt The Warlord Chronicles trilogy for television, and co-wrote 10 episodes of The Winter King (2023) based on the first book. The series was cancelled after the first season following mixed reviews.

Brooke directed her first short film Bloodsport in 2024, winning Best Short Film at Birmingham Film Festival and Best Thriller at the Poppy Jaspar Film Festival in California.

== Personal life ==
In 1997 Brooke married Stephen Lovegrove, the former UK National Security Adviser. He was appointed Knight Grand Cross of the Order of St Michael and St George (GCMG) in the 2024 New Year Honours.

The couple have two daughters and live in London, England.

== Filmography ==
=== Writing credits ===
Production	Notes	Broadcaster
Six Pairs of Pants	"Episode #1.1" (1995)	Channel 4
Family Affairs	12 episodes (1998–2000)	Channel 5
Protesting Too Much	6 episodes (co-written with Sally Phillips, 2000)	BBC Radio 4
Always and Everyone	"Episode #2.6" (2000)	ITV
Danielle Cable: Eyewitness	Television film (co-written with Terry Winsor, 2003)	ITV
The Forsyte Saga, Series II	Television miniseries (co-written with John Galsworthy and Phil Woods, 2003)	ITV
Secret Smile	Television film (2005)	ITV
Joanne Lees: Murder in the Outback	Television film (2007)	ITV
Wired	Television miniseries (2008)	ITV
Breaking the Mould	Television film (2009)	BBC Four
Case Sensitive	"The Point of Rescue" (2011)	ITV
The Making of a Lady	Television film (2012)	ITV
The Ice Cream Girls	Television miniseries (2013)	ITV
Mr Selfridge	11 episodes (co-written with Andrew Davies, 2013–)	ITV
Bancroft	4 part Thriller (2017)	ITV
A Discovery of Witches	5 episodes (2018)	Sky One
The Winter King	10 episodes (co-written with Ed Whitmore, 2023)	ITV, MGM+

== Awards and nominations ==
Year	Award	Work	Category	Result	Reference
2007	Edgar Allan Poe Awards	Secret Smile	Best Television Feature/Mini-Series Teleplay (shared with Nicci Gerrard)	Nominated	
