= Gretel & Hansel =

2020 horror film by Osgood Perkins

- Theatrical release poster
- Directed by: Osgood Perkins
- Screenplay by: Rob Hayes
- Based on: "Hansel and Gretel" by the Brothers Grimm
- Produced by: Brian Kavanaugh-Jones; Fred Berger
- Starring: Sophia Lillis; Sam Leakey; Alice Krige; Jessica De Gouw
- Cinematography: Galo Olivares
- Edited by: Josh Ethier; Julia Wong
- Music by: ROB
- Production companies: Orion Pictures; Bron Creative; Automatik Entertainment
- Distributed by: United Artists Releasing (United States); Renaissance Media (Canada)
- Release date: 31 January 2020
- Running time: 87 minutes
- Countries: Canada; United States
- Language: English
- Budget: $5 million
- Box office: $22.3 million

Gretel & Hansel (also known as Gretel & Hansel: A Grim Fairy Tale) is a 2020 dark fantasy horror film directed by Osgood Perkins and written by Rob Hayes, based on the German fairy tale "Hansel and Gretel" by the Brothers Grimm. Sophia Lillis and Sam Leakey portray the titular characters, with Alice Krige and Jessica De Gouw also starring. The film follows the siblings Gretel and Hansel as they become lost in the forest and then stumble upon the home of a witch.

Gretel & Hansel was released in the United States on 31 January 2020, by United Artists Releasing. The film grossed $22.3 million worldwide against a $5 million production budget and received generally positive reviews from critics, with praise for its visuals and cinematography as well as the horror elements and acting, but criticism for its pacing and screenplay.

== Plot ==
The prologue opens with a story about "a beautiful child with a pretty pink hat", a mortally wounded baby girl. Her father takes her to the woods to be cured by a witch, who performs healing spells, bestowing supernatural abilities on the child in the process. As the girl grows up, the villagers come to hear her premonitions, but her wicked nature is soon revealed when she begins murdering innocent people, including her own father. The rest of the village imprison her in the woods, where she begins to lure children to their deaths.

The scene shifts to teenage Gretel, who often takes care of her younger brother, Hansel, and is implied to also have some sort of supernatural powers. As their father dies, their mother sends them out to find work. Gretel is offered a housekeeping job but turns it down when the master of the house asks about her virginity. Their mother rebukes Gretel for failing to provide for them and threatens to kill both children if they do not leave the house.

The siblings flee and find temporary accommodation for the night, but a ghoulish man appears and attacks Hansel. A huntsman saves the children and takes them to his home for the night, before sending them off to find work the next morning. They get lost in the woods and, suffering from hunger, are attracted by the scent of baked cake to a hut in the forest, in which a woman named Holda lives. She invites the children in for a meal and allows them to stay, in exchange for performing work around the house. Hansel is sent into the woods to practice woodcutting with an axe, while Gretel assists with housekeeping. Hansel is happy with their new home, but Gretel is suspicious of Holda and troubled by disturbing visions and nightmares. Sensing Gretel's abilities, Holda initiates her into witchcraft and teaches her to levitate her wooden staff with the aid of flying ointment.

Hansel soon becomes wary of Holda after discovering a satanic pentagram carved into a tree. The siblings have an argument that night, and Hansel leaves the hut and is then lured into a trap by Holda. Gretel confronts the witch, who insists she is doing Gretel a favour by getting rid of Hansel. It is then revealed that Holda was the mother of the wicked girl from the prologue story; Holda loathed her daughter for killing her husband and other innocents and was the one who imprisoned her in the woods. In order to get revenge on her daughter, Holda ate children to gain magical powers, killed her daughter, and took her place at the cottage, luring in children, in the guise of an elderly woman.

Holda drugs Gretel and straps her down in the cellar, where she plans for Hansel to be eaten. Now in the form of a young woman, Holda lures Hansel into a cage atop a large fire pit so she can cook him. Gretel manages to free herself and uses flying ointment on her hands and face to levitate a wooden staff and pin Holda against the wall, where she slowly burns to death over the fire, which causes the spells she has cast to cease working. This awakens Hansel from his drugged state.

The next morning, Gretel assures her brother that Holda is gone for good and sends him back home (their mother is implied to have died in the meantime and Hansel should be able to start working at home as a woodsman). Gretel stays behind to hone her craft. She sees the ghosts of the children murdered by Holda, now finally free to pass on.

In the closing moments, her fingertips begin to turn black, just as Holda's had been.

== Cast ==
- Sophia Lillis as Gretel, a 16-year-old girl and Hansel's older sister.
- Sam Leakey as Hansel, Gretel's 8-year-old brother (the role was Leakey's acting debut).
- Alice Krige as Holda, a terrifying and powerful evil witch who lives in the forest and kidnaps Gretel and Hansel.
  - Jessica De Gouw as young Holda
- Charles Babalola as Huntsman, a young man who helps Gretel and Hansel early in the story.
- Fiona O'Shaughnessy as Mother
- Donncha Crowley as Master Stripp
- Melody Carrillo as Enchantress
- Jonathan Delaney Tynan as Father
- Jonathan Gunning as emaciated man
- Ian Kenny as Knight
- Abdul Alshareef as Knight
- Manuel Pombo as Knight
- Giulia Doherty as Beautiful Child
- Beatrix Perkins as Clicky (uncredited)

== Production ==
In October 2018, the Hollywood Reporter wrote that Orion Pictures had started developing a film adaptation of the German folklore tale Hansel and Gretel, with Oz Perkins directing a screenplay he had co-written with Rob Hayes, and Sophia Lillis starring as the lead character. Sinister producer Brian Kavanaugh-Jones and The Autopsy of Jane Doe producer Fred Berger, partners at Automatik Entertainment, were announced as producers, with Sandra Yee Ling and Macdara Kelleher as executive producers. Hayes eventually received sole screenplay credit.

In November 2018, Charles Babalola was cast as the Hunter, a new character who helps Gretel and Hansel navigate the woods. In April 2019, Alice Krige, Jessica De Gouw, and Sam Leakey joined the cast, with Leakey making his acting debut.

Perkins explained in an interview that the title was changed because this version focuses on Gretel:

"It's awfully faithful to the original story. It's got really only three principal characters: Hansel, Gretel, and the Witch. We tried to find a way to make it more of a coming of age story. I wanted Gretel to be somewhat older than Hansel, so it didn't feel like two 12-year-olds – rather a 16-year-old and an 8-year-old. There was more of a feeling like Gretel having to take Hansel around everywhere she goes, and how that can impede one's own evolution, how our attachments and the things that we love can sometimes get in the way of our growth."

Principal photography on the film began on 9 November 2018 in Dublin, Ireland, and wrapped up in December 2018. Additional filming and reshoots started in January 2019 in Langley, British Columbia, Canada.

=== Music ===
The score was composed by Robin Coudert, also known by his stage name, Rob. With the soundtrack in mind, Rob avoided using typical symphonic orchestral themes to create a unique film score saying, "I find it essential to create melodies that we can sing or whistle as, in horror cinema, it is usually the opposite, where the music rather has a tendency toward structure and abstraction. For this project, which is a film about kids, it seemed important to have that." The soundtrack was released by Waxwork Records in 2020 as a single LP.

== Release ==
The film was released on 31 January 2020 by United Artists.

=== Home video ===
Warner Bros. Home Entertainment released the film digitally on 7 April 2020, and on DVD and Blu-ray on 5 May 2020.

== Reception ==
=== Box office ===
In the United States and Canada, the film was released alongside The Rhythm Section, and was projected to gross $4–7 million from 3,000 theaters in its opening weekend. The film made $2.3 million on its first day (including $475,000 from Thursday night previews). It debuted to $6.1 million, finishing fourth.

=== Critical response ===
Metacritic review
breakdown (unweighted)

Positive
11 (65%)
Mixed
4 (24%)
Negative
2 (12%)

On Rotten Tomatoes, the film holds an approval rating of 63% based on 115 reviews, with an average rating of 6.2/10. The site's critical consensus reads: "Gretel & Hansel's rich visuals satisfy, even if this adaptation of a classic fairytale gets a little lost in the woods on the storytelling front." On Metacritic, the film has a weighted average score of 64 out of 100, based on 17 critics, indicating "generally favorable" reviews. Audiences polled by CinemaScore gave the film an average grade of "C−" on an A+ to F scale.

Contrarily, Andrew Barker of Variety wrote, "The film certainly looks nice, with a wealth of eye-catching compositions," but added, "The problem is that so many of its virtues feel compromised." Kimber Myers wrote for The Los Angeles Times, "While [Perkins] offers a stunning feast for the eyes, the substance is likely to leave viewers still hungry."

Chandler Levack from The Globe and Mail wrote, "Everything about Gretel & Hansel is weirder, smarter and way more cinematic than I'd expected, thanks to some fascinating movie choices made by director Oz Perkins." Kate Rife from The A.V. Club wrote, "If one of the boundaries being tested in this film is viewers' patience, the reward for—to use a refrain repeated throughout the film—'trusting the darkness' is well worth the commitment." Frank Sheck of The Hollywood Reporter wrote, "Gretel & Hansel may alienate some horror movie fans with its extremely leisurely pacing and emphasis on atmosphere and mood rather than visceral shocks. But while the film certainly demands patience, it provides ample rewards with its lush stylization."

Mark Kennedy of the Associated Press wrote, "Gretel & Hansel is as visually arresting as it is tedious, a 90-minute movie that really should have been a 3-minute music video for Marilyn Manson or Ozzy Osbourne. It's in the horror genre only loosely. It's more eerie, if that's a genre. Actually, it's like dread for 90 minutes. It's dreadful." Jeannette Catsoulis of The New York Times labeled the film "Essentially the story of a young woman coming into her power, Gretel & Hansel is quietly sinister, yet too underdeveloped to truly scare."

== See also ==
- List of films about witchcraft
