= Shoot on Sight =

2007 film by Jag Mundhra

- Film poster
- Directed by: Jag Mundhra
- Written by: Carl Austin
- Produced by: Aron Govil
- Starring: Brian Cox; Sadie Frost; Naseeruddin Shah; Om Puri; Mikaal Zulfiqar
- Cinematography: Madhu Ambat
- Music by: John Altman
- Distributed by: Aron Govill Productions
- Release dates: 15 December 2007 (Dubai International Film Festival); 22 August 2008 (United Kingdom)
- Country: United Kingdom
- Language: English

Shoot on Sight is a 2007 British film directed by Jag Mundhra and produced by Aron Govil. The film was marketed and distributed globally by Aron Govil Productions Inc. The cast includes Brian Cox, Sadie Frost, Naseeruddin Shah and Om Puri.

== Plot ==
Tariq Ali, a Muslim police commander of Scotland Yard, is asked to hunt down suspected suicide-bombers against the backdrop of the 7 July 2005 London bombings. Ali's task becomes more complicated as an innocent Muslim is killed by armed police on the Underground. Alo, a Lahore-born British citizen married to an English woman with two children, is himself distrusted by his colleagues, despite his long service in the Metropolitan Police.

== Cast ==
- Naseeruddin Shah as Police Commander Tariq Ali
- Greta Scacchi as Susan Ali
- Brian Cox as Daniel Tennant
- Stephen Greif as Commander John Shepherd
- Om Puri as Junaid
- Gulshan Grover as Yunus
- Chris Wilson as Police CO19 Officer
- Sadie Frost as Advocate Fiona Monroe
- Mikaal Zulfiqar as Zaheer Khan
- Laila Rouass as Ruby Kaur
- India Wadsworth as Zara Ali
- Arrun Harker as Imran Ali
- Tolga Safer as Aziz
- Clifford Samuel as Elijah
- San Shella as Abdullah
- Julian Glover as Susan's Father
- Ralph Ineson as Marber
- Josie Kidd as Susan's Mother
- Avtar Kaul as Baqir Hassan
- Robert Lowe as Sean's Mate
- Taru Devani as Baqir's Mother
- John Warman as Armed Response
- Alex McSweeney as PC Brian Andrews
- Cloudia Swann as PC Justine Miller
- Clemency Burton-Hill as Pamela Davies
- Sylvester Williams as Reporter 1
- James Harrington as Reporter 2
- Jamie Doyle as Sean
- Ashley Allen as Sean's Mate
- Faye Peters as Hannah Marber
- Neelam Bakshi as Yunus's Wife

== Production ==
Shoot on Sight is a story based on Operation Kratos, the police "shoot-to-kill" policy applied to suspected suicide-bombers after the 7 July 2005 London bombings. The shooting of an innocent Muslim in the Underground is based on an actual event, the shooting of an innocent Brazilian on 22 July 2005 whom police thought to be a Muslim terrorist about to detonate a suicide bomb.
