= Richard Curson Smith =

British television director and producer

Richard Curson Smith is a British television director and producer. He has BAFTA, Emmy, RTS, Grierson, Real Screen, Broadcast, CSA and Prix Italia awards and nominations.

He heads his own production company, Absinthe Film Entertainment and is married to the British television producer and author Franny Moyle and has three children.

== Filmography ==
- Urban Myths - Orson Welles In Norwich 2020.
- The Importance of Being Oscar 2019.
- Joe Orton Laid Bare 2017.
- Francis Bacon: A Brush with Violence 2017. Nominee BAFTA Scotland Award
- Justice for MLK: The Hunt for James Earl Ray 2017. Nominee Canadian Screen Award
- Ted Hughes: Stronger Than Death 2016. Nominee BAFTA Scotland Award, Winner Celtic Media Award. Grierson nominee.
- THE SON OF SAM 2017.
- RUDOLF NUREYEV: DANCE TO FREEDOM 2015. Nominee specialist factual BAFTA. Winner Dance Screen Best Film. Special mention Prix Italia.
- END OF THE DREAM 2015. Nominee Canadian Screen Award: Best Biography
- THE APARTMENT 2012
- The Making of a Lady 2012
- THE MINOR CHARACTER 2012
- MILIBAND OF BROTHERS 2010
- PRIMEVAL 2009
- Wire in the Blood: 'Falls the Shadow' 2008
- Consenting Adults 2007
- Pinochet in Suburbia 2006
- Agatha Christie: A Life in Pictures Nominated for a Rose d'Or Drama Award and a Grierson Award.
- Home Nominated for an RTS Award. Nominated for 'Best Single Drama' at the Broadcast Awards.
- SURREALISSIMO! The Scandalous Success of Salvador Dali
- IF
- SEVEN DWARVES
- BLUE DIAMOND
- BEYOND THE FATAL SHORE
- ANATOMY OF DESIRE
- CNN Millennium
- PANDEMONIUM
- SPENDING THE KIDS' INHERITANCE
- THE LAST MACHINE
- DEAD PRESIDENTS EMMY nominated
- Inside Victor Lewis-Smith
- 10 x 10: WITH BOUNCING SOLES
- BURNING MAN
