= Michael C. Moynihan =

American journalist (born 1974)

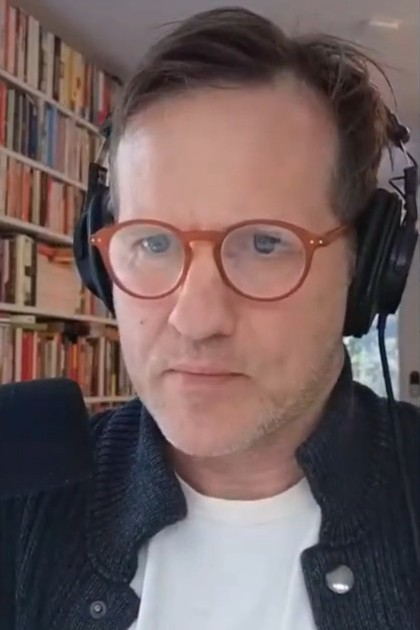
- Moynihan recording a video for Reason TV in 2024
- Born: August 24, 1974 (age 52)
- Other name: Michael Moynihan
- Education: University of Massachusetts Amherst (B.A.)
- Occupation: Journalist

Michael Christopher Moynihan (born August 24, 1974) is an American journalist. A former national correspondent for Vice News, he co-hosts The Fifth Column podcast and hosts The Moynihan Report. He was previously the cultural news editor for The Daily Beast, the managing editor of Vice magazine, and a senior editor of the libertarian magazine Reason. He has been a contributor to The Wall Street Journal's book review and produced content for The Free Press until resigning in 2025.

Moynihan was also a resident fellow of the free-market think tank Timbro in Sweden, where he lived and wrote articles about politics in the country, contributing to Swedish-language publications, including Expressen, Aftonbladet, Sveriges Television, Neo and Göteborgs-Tidningen. According to Media Bistro, "Moynihan is perhaps best known for breaking the story on Jonah Lehrer's fabrications."

== Education ==
Moynihan attended Concord-Carlisle High School in Concord, Massachusetts, and graduated from the University of Massachusetts Amherst with a Bachelor of Arts degree in history.

== Career ==
=== Sweden ===
Moynihan founded the Stockholm Spectator, an English-language website based in Stockholm, Sweden. According to Sveriges Radio, the site was originally intended to be a print publication modeled on The Village Voice. Writers were mainly English-speaking expatriates living in Sweden. "Despite the fact that so many Swedes speak and read in English there were almost no English-language newspapers in Sweden," said Moynihan to Sveriges Radio in 2004. It maintained a focus on criticism of the media, but also dealt with current topics in politics and music. Moynihan began serving on the editorial board of the Swedish magazine Neo in 2006 along with Peter Wolodarski and Theodore Paues. Swedish politician Carl Bildt sat on the board of the publication.

During a controversy in 2006 where the website SD-Kuriren was criticized by the Swedish Minister of Foreign Affairs Laila Freivalds for publishing satires of the Islamic prophet, Muhammad, the website was taken down by its provider. As editor of the Stockholm Spectator, Moynihan reacted to what he viewed as suppression of freedom of the press, and posted to the blog of the magazine one of the more offensive of the caricatures of Muhammad. He was a resident fellow at the organization Timbro, a free-market think tank based in Stockholm. He lived in Sweden and wrote articles about the politics of the country. Moynihan has contributed articles to Swedish-language publications, including Expressen, Aftonbladet, Sveriges Television, Neo, and Göteborgs-Tidningen. Moynihan was the producer of a 2006 documentary for Modern Times Group of Sweden's TV8, on American conservative radio talk show host Barry Farber. He performed research for Timbro in 2007 in which he wrote critically of Noam Chomsky's research methods, and argued that Chomsky did not deserve an honorary doctorate he received at Uppsala University.

=== Washington, D.C. ===
Moynihan was an associate editor for Reason prior to serving as its senior editor, having joined the staff of the magazine in August 2007. His December 24, 2007, article for Reason, "Flunking Free Speech: The Persistent Threat to Liberty on College Campuses", was cited by Robert H. Jackson Legal Fellow at the Foundation for Individual Rights in Education, Azhar Majeed, in the legal journal The Georgetown Journal of Law & Public Policy in 2009. Moynihan was a contributor to the Los Angeles Times in 2008. After Barack Obama was elected president of the United States in November 2008, The Atlanta Journal-Constitution highlighted critical comments by Moynihan of the president-elect's supporters, in a sample of political viewpoints following the election. He conducted interviews for Reason.tv in 2009. In 2010, he was a visiting fellow at Timbro. Moynihan is the senior editor of both Reason magazine, and its website, Reason.com. He resided in Washington, D.C., in 2010.

Moynihan announced his participation in the protest movement "Everybody Draw Mohammed Day", which began in May 2010. The movement grew in response to censorship by Comedy Central of an episode of South Park which depicted Muhammad. Moynihan stated he would post his own contributions in addition to submissions from other individuals to the website of Reason on the protest movement's scheduled date of May 20, 2010. He encouraged his readers to send him their drawings. Moynihan stated he planned to select some of his favorite depictions of Muhammad from the protest movement, and then add them to the Reason.com website. Moynihan commented, "In the South Park episode that started all this, Buddha does lines of coke and there was an episode where Cartman started a Christian rock band that sang very homo-erotic songs. Yet there is one religious figure we can't make fun of. The point of the episode that started the controversy is that celebrities wanted Muhammad's power not to be ridiculed. How come non-Muslims aren't allowed to make jokes?" Moynihan noted, "Any time you cave into terrorism, it emboldens extremists," and posited that the decision of Comedy Central to enact self-censorship of the South Park episode would have the impact of worsening the situation.

In a February 2011 book review for The Wall Street Journal, Moynihan provided evidence that British author Dominic Sandbrook was guilty of "[r]ecycling the phrasing, the descriptive adjectives, the reportorial detail of other historians—in other words, ignoring the codes and courtesies of historical scholarship." The next year, Moynihan told the New York Observer that he had been surprised to see Sandbrook's book "published in paperback with no corrections."

=== New York ===
==== Vice ====
In 2011, Moynihan left Reason to become managing editor of Vice magazine, which he left the next year to work at The Daily Beast.

He would return to Vice in 2016, writing for the magazine but also serving as a correspondent and producer on the brand's television program and daily news program, both airing on HBO. He would win a News and Documentary Emmy Awards for "Outstanding Coverage of a Breaking News Story" for his work on the controversies of the Brett Kavanaugh Supreme Court nomination.

==== Tablet ====
Moynihan contributed the "Righteous Gentile" column to Tablet magazine in 2012 and 2013. In his column, he maintained that the news network Russia Today (RT) is a propaganda outlet, examined the Polish reaction to President Obama's reference in a speech to World War II "Polish death camps," accused New York congressional candidate Charles Barron of being anti-Semitic, and reflected on the advice of Israel's ambassador to Denmark that "in certain areas of Copenhagen, it's best to keep your Judaism to yourself." A Moynihan article that appeared in Tablet Magazine on July 30, 2012, contained evidence that New Yorker writer Jonah Lehrer had fabricated Bob Dylan quotations and led to Lehrer's resignation and to the withdrawal of two of his three books from circulation.

After Lehrer's resignation, Moynihan told the New York Observer that he felt sorry for Lehrer and "wasn't trying to hurt him…. I really do wish him the best and I really do hope he recovers from this." Moynihan revealed in a March 2013 article for the Daily Beast/Newsweek that after Lehrer's book publisher withdrew his third book, Imagine, from bookstores, Moynihan "privately provided them with a handful of problematic passages" from Lehrer's second book, How We Decide, leading to the withdrawal of that book as well.

==== The Daily Beast ====
Moynihan has been cultural news editor of The Daily Beast since 2012. In his contributions to the Daily Beast, he has criticized Robert Bork's fondness for censorship and Sean Penn's admiration for Hugo Chavez, written about the uncritical media enthusiasm for Julian Assange and the unreliability of Wikipedia, deplored Jane Goodall's plagiarism and the hiring of left-wing radicals with criminal backgrounds as university professors. He has described Peter Kuznick and Oliver Stone's book The Untold History of the United States and its companion TV series as "junk history" and "a marvel of historical illiteracy," and accused Piers Morgan of journalistic unseriousness, claiming that he "eschews intelligent debate in favor of screaming matches with conspiracy nuts." Moynihan criticized the propensity of many media commentators to predict the democratic reform of North Korea, Cuba, and other dictatorships and questioned "the mindless deification of Pete Seeger," who, he claims, "never really did abandon the dream of Communism."

Moynihan has described Dennis Rodman as "his generation's dull-witted John Reed," criticized U.S. Congressmen who soft-pedaled Russia's jailing of Pussy Riot members, complained about what he views as the excessive sniffing out of political incorrectness in movies and TV shows "rather than just let art be art," and said that the foreign news networks RT, PressTV, and Fars are "like professional wrestling: absurd, occasionally funny, and always fake."

In a November 2012 article, Moynihan mocked the awarding of the Nobel Peace Prize to the European Union, writing that "there are a number of overlapping and interwoven reasons for the relative calm of modern Europe, and none of them are related to the moral authority or peace-making capabilities of the European Union or the endless diktats emanating from Brussels." After Nelson Mandela's death, Moynihan wrote that "while Mandela was richly deserving of his Nobel Prize and earned the overused appellation 'great man,' he wasn't a saint"; after the abdication of Pope Benedict XVI, Moynihan called him a "moral failure"; after Bill de Blasio was elected as Mayor of New York, Moynihan criticized the nostalgia for the crime-ridden New York of the 1970s that was on display at the inauguration. Following Hugo Chavez's death, Moynihan described his regime as "extralegal, vindictive, and interested in the short-term gesture rather than the more difficult, long-term solution," and said that "Chávez's lesson for future authoritarians" is to "make a mockery of democratic institutions, rewrite the Constitution, and persecute—and prosecute—your political enemies. But when you do so, make sure to mutter the appropriate things about poverty, 'the empire,' and the scourge of 'neoliberalism.' All will be forgiven."

== Media appearances ==
Moynihan spoke at the Oslo Freedom Forum in May 2014. He has also appeared on Fox News with John Stossel, discussing his Daily Beast column accusing then-presidential candidate Bernie Sanders' of support for food rationing and bread lines in the Soviet Union. Until the show's cancellation in April 2017, Moynihan appeared on Red Eye on Fox News periodically. Moynihan has made multiple appearances on HBO's Real Time with Bill Maher.

== Podcast ==
Michael Moynihan is co-host of The Fifth Column podcast along with Matt Welch and Kmele Foster. He also hosts The Moynihan Report, an interview program with live caller participation via the 2WAY platform. He has been a guest on various podcasts, including The Megyn Kelly Show and The Remnant with Jonah Goldberg.

== See also ==
- Libertarianism in the United States
- Political blog
- Politics of Sweden
- The Huffington Post
