= Bancroft (TV series) =

British television series

- DVD cover for series one
- Genre: Crime drama
- Created by: Kate Brooke
- Directed by: John Hayes; Lawrence Gough
- Starring: Sarah Parish; Adam Long; Adrian Edmondson; Lee Boardman; Charles Babalola
- Composer: Edmund Butt
- Country of origin: United Kingdom
- Original language: English
- No. of series: 2
- No. of episodes: 7

Production
- Executive producers: Kate Brooke; Patrick Schweitzer; Catherine Oldfield
- Producers: Phil Collinson (S1); Simon Meyers (S2)
- Production company: Tall Story Pictures

Original release
- Network: ITV
- Release: 11 December 2017 – 3 January 2020

Bancroft is a British television thriller series that premiered on ITV on 11 December 2017 and concluded on 14 December 2017. The series was produced by Tall Story Pictures for ITV, and distributed worldwide by ITV Studios Global Entertainment. It was created and written by Kate Brooke. A second series was broadcast from 1 January 2020 to 3 January 2020. On 3 November 2020 ITV cancelled Bancroft after two series.

== Synopsis ==
Detective Superintendent Elizabeth Bancroft (Parish) discovers her colleague DS Katherine Stevens (Marsay) has been given a cold case to solve who really killed Laura Fraser (Sacofsky) in 1990. The investigation ties into Bancroft's own dark past.

== Cast ==
=== Main ===
- Sarah Parish as Detective Superintendent / Detective Chief Superintendent Elizabeth Bancroft
- Adam Long as Joe Bancroft
- Adrian Edmondson as Superintendent Clifford Walker
- Lee Boardman as Detective Inspector George Morris
- Charles Babalola as Detective Sergeant Andy Bevan
- Ryan McKen as Danesh Kamara
- Shameem Ahmad as Naila Kamara

=== Series 1 (2017) ===
- Faye Marsay as Detective Sergeant Katherine Stevens
- Amara Karan as Dr. Anya Karim
- Art Malik as Chief Superintendent Alan Taheeri
- Linus Roache as Tim Fraser
- Lily Sacofsky as Laura Fraser
- Anjli Mohindra as Zaheera Kamara

=== Series 2 (2020) ===
- David Avery as Detective Superintendent Jake Harper
- Jacqueline Boatswain as Chief Constable Frances Holland
- James Quinn as Detective Sergeant Richard Potter
- Yemisi Oyinloye as Detective Constable Sally Reed
- Charlotte Hope as Annabel Connors

== Episodes ==
=== Series overview ===
Series	Episodes	Originally released	
Series	Episodes	First released	Last released
1	4	11 December 2017	14 December 2017
2	3	1 January 2020	3 January 2020

=== Series 1 (2017) ===
No.	Title	Directed by	Written by	Original release date	U.K. viewers (millions)
1	"1.1"	John Hayes	Kate Brooke	11 December 2017	8.35
2	"1.2"	John Hayes	Kate Brooke	12 December 2017	7.07
3	"1.3"	John Hayes	Kate Brooke & Ben Morris	13 December 2017	7.03
4	"1.4"	John Hayes	Kate Brooke	14 December 2017	7.27

=== Series 2 (2020) ===
No.	Title	Directed by	Written by	Original release date	U.K. viewers (millions)
1	"2.1"	Lawrence Gough	Kate Brooke & Ben Morris	1 January 2020	5.92
2	"2.2"	Lawrence Gough	Kate Brooke & Ben Morris	2 January 2020	4.63
3	"2.3"	Lawrence Gough	Kate Brooke & Ben Morris	3 January 2020	5.01
