= Proust Was a Neuroscientist =

Book by Jonah Lehrer

- Author: Jonah Leher
- Publication date: 2007
- ISBN: 9780547085906

Proust Was a Neuroscientist is a non-fiction book written by Jonah Lehrer, first published in 2007. In it, Lehrer argues that many 20th and 21st-century discoveries of neuroscience are actually re-discoveries of insights made earlier by various artists, including Gertrude Stein, Walt Whitman, Paul Cézanne, Igor Stravinsky, and, as alluded to in the title, Marcel Proust.

Lehrer became embroiled in controversy following the publication of his third book, Imagine: How Creativity Works (2012), and his work was subject to charges of plagiarism and fabrication. Though both Imagine and one of his other books, How We Decide, were pulled from publication, Proust Was a Neuroscientist was found by his publisher to be without significant problems and would remain in print.
