= Trans Mission =

2026 benefit concert in London, England

- Location: London, England
- Venue: Wembley Arena
- Date: March 11, 2026; 4 months ago
- Website: Official website

Trans Mission was a benefit concert in support of the transgender community, held on 11 March 2026 at the Wembley Arena in London.

== History ==
In April 2025, the Supreme Court of the United Kingdom ruled in For Women Scotland Ltd v The Scottish Ministers that "sex" in the Equality Act 2010 refers solely to biological sex, a ruling that impacted transgender rights. In response, musicians and music industry professionals Tom Rasmussen, Tom Mehrtens, Olly Alexander, and Martha Kinn posted an open letter of solidarity with the trans community, which was signed by hundreds in the music industry.

Glyn Fussell, director of the Mighty Hoopla music festival, had already been considering a trans fundraiser. He was motivated by the open letter, and collaborated with Alexander and Trans Voices choir co-founders Ilā Kamalagharan and Coda Nicolaeff on a Live Aid-inspired festival, using the letter's signatories as a list of potential performers.

In an interview prior to the concert, Alexander stated that he hoped the event sent "a big statement that trans people are loved and that cisgender people care about what’s happening to them." Danielle St James, founder of the trans charity and concert beneficiary Not a Phase, cited Live Aid, Band Aid, and Madonna as other "examples of the music industry stepping in real times where people's rights were being challenged, especially when it comes to wider LGBT rights."

== Concert ==
Trans Mission took place on 11 March 2026 at the Wembley Arena in London in front of over 10,000 people and was hosted by Harriet Rose. Officially billed as "A Night of Solidarity For A Lifetime Of Change", the event was opened by Rasmussen and closed by Adam Lambert. Breaks between performances were punctuated by DJ Bestley, who played queer pop tracks by artists including Frankie Goes To Hollywood, Lady Gaga, and Robyn.

The event also featured various speakers, including Caroline Litman, whose daughter Alice Litman died by suicide while waiting for gender-affirming healthcare, and various pre-recorded messages from numerous celebrities, including previously scheduled performer Bimini Bon-Boulash. Throughout the concert, volunteers collected donations from the crowd.

Performers

- Adam Lambert
- Beth Ditto (Gossip)
- Beverley Knight
- Christine And The Queens (Rahim Redcar)
- Gottmik
- HAAi
- Imogen Heap
- Jacob Alon
- Kate Nash
- Kae Tempest
- Jasmine.4.T
- MNEK
- Olly Alexander
- Romy (The xx)
- Rose Gray
- Sink the Pink
- Sugababes
- Sophie Ellis-Bextor
- Tom Rasmussen
- Trans Voices choir
- Wolf Alice

Speakers

- Caroline Litman
- Dani St James
- Harriet Rose
- Ian McKellen
- Janet Ellis
- Jordan Stephens
- Juno Dawson
- Munroe Bergdorf
- Nicola Coughlan
- Russell Tovey
- Shon Faye
- Tia Kofi
- Zack Polanski

Pre-recorded speakers

- Bimini Bon-Boulash
- David Tennant
- Emma Bunton
- Jake Shears
- Jessie Ware
- Lola Young
- Mel C
- Stephen Fry

== Fundraising ==
The event raised funds for the non-profit Good Law Project and the trans charity Not a Phase, with one hundred percent of the profits from the fundraiser split between the recipients.

== Reception ==
Attitude described the event "as a massive, glittering middle finger to the hostility the trans community faces in the UK on a daily basis", while The Line of Best Fit wrote that the event "ran with the steady rhythm of a political rally disguised as a pop concert, though not without its spectrum of encouraging words and outrage at the forces targeting trans lives".
