= Bergdorf (disambiguation) =

Bergdorf may refer to:

- Bergdorf Goodman, a luxury goods department store based on Fifth Avenue in Midtown Manhattan in New York City
  - Bergdorf Goodman Building, the women's store of Bergdorf Goodman

== People ==
- Dominik Bergdorf (born 1993), German footballer
- Munroe Bergdorf (born Ian Bergdorf, 1987), British activist and model

== See also ==
- Bergdorf Blondes, 2004 chick lit debut novel of Plum Sykes
- Munroe Bergdorf race row incident
- "BERGDORF", 2021 hip-hop song by American rapper Destroy Lonely on the album No Stylist
