= David Avery =

English actor (born 1986)

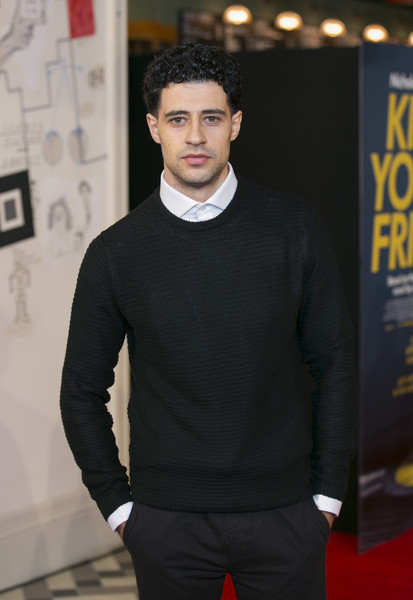
- Avery in 2015
- Born: 6 April 1986 (age 40); Birmingham, England
- Occupation: Actor
- Years active: 2009–present

David Avery (born 6 April 1986) is a British actor. He has appeared in the television series The Night Manager, and films Starred Up and Lost in London.

== Background ==
Avery was born 6 April 1986 in Birmingham. He attended Baverstock Secondary School in Druids Heath, Birmingham until 2002. After graduating Avery relocated to London with his immediate family. In 2008 he graduated from the Central School of Speech and Drama with an MA in Acting for Screen.

== Career ==
Avery's first on screen role came in 2009 by starring in the third series of Sofia's Diary. He joined the lead cast as Flex featuring throughout the series. Sofia's Diary, produced by Sony Television, was one of the first online web series to make the transition to UK television. Avery's first feature film part was in Fit written and directed by Rikki Beadle-Blair. Shortly after, Avery landed the part of Nicos in The Inbetweeners Movie. The film went on to break UK box office records for the opening weekend. In 2012 Avery took part in the June edition of Monologue Slam UK. Actors take to the stage to compete against each other by performing monologues to a professional industry panel. Avery won first prize for his performance, "The monologue that David performed captivating the room was 'Nowhere in America' by Bathsheba Doran".

Avery is also notable for playing lead character Marcus Graham in the multi-award-winning web-to-television series Brothers With No Game. The series amassed a huge international following when the first episode was released online in June 2012. Avery and the cast later returned for a second series with the public demand being so high and winning six awards at the LA Web Festival 2013. The show's popularity got the attention of London Live and went on to be broadcast in 2014. The lead cast of the show also went on to win Favourite Web Series Ensemble at the first ever Screen Nation Digital-iS awards.

Avery's television work continued when he joined the cast of CBBC's The Dumping Ground. Avery played Kingsley Jackson alongside Victoria Alcock. The family were a popular addition to the first series, so much so they were asked to return to the show for a Christmas Special episode, "Jody in Wonderland". The series went on to win a BAFTA that year for Best Drama. His next major role was landing the part of Ashley in feature film Starred Up opposite Jack O'Connell and Ben Mendelsohn. The film received excellent reviews ("Raw and Immediate" – Variety) and 4/5 stars from Empire magazine. The film was directed by David Mackenzie and went on to win various awards including Best Feature Film at BAFTA Scotland 2014.

His career gained momentum in 2016 with a stand out performance as Freddie Hamid in the BBC/AMC series The Night Manager. The British-American production is based on the 1993 novel of the same name by John le Carré. The series was directed by Susanne Bier and the lead cast included Tom Hiddleston, Hugh Laurie and Olivia Colman. The series won two Primetime Emmy Awards and three Golden Globes.

Later that year Avery joined the lead cast of Borderline, a retro-scripted comedy series following the work of UK Border Force staff at the fictional Northend Airport. Avery received a number of positive reviews for his performance as Agent Tariq Mansour. The Guardian wrote – "For instance, there's border agent Tariq, a failed DJ and one of characters who succeeds in injecting genuine humour into his part with subtle timing and a good line in kill-me-now-I-hate-my-life facial expressions."

In 2017 Avery starred in Lost in London opposite Woody Harrelson and Owen Wilson. It was the first film ever to broadcast live into movie theatres worldwide as it was shot in real time. The film was captured in one take using 24 shooting locations and included car and foot chase scenes.

Deadline announced in December 2022 that Avery would be joining the cast of MGM+’s and Sky's second season of Domina playing the role of Domitius.

== Filmography ==
=== Television ===
Year	Title	Role	Notes
2009	Sofia's Diary	Flex	2 episodes
2010	Missing	Pete Walsh	Episode 2.2
2010	Coming Up – DIP	Theo	Episode 8.7
2012	Brothers With No Game	Marcus Graham	14 episodes (Seasons 1 & 2)
2012	Pini	Dave	Episode "Gorillas in the Mist"
2013	Doctor Who	Fabian	Episode "The Name of the Doctor"
2013	The Dumping Ground	Kingsley Jackson	2 Episodes "S.O.S" & "Jody in Wonderland".
2014	24: Live Another Day	Donny	2 episodes
2015	Spotless	Yilmaz	Episode 1.7
2016	The Night Manager	Freddie Hamid	2 episodes
2016	Doctors	Jake Ashby	Episode "Promises, Promises"
2016	Borderline	Tariq Mansoor	6 episodes
2016	The Dumping Ground	Kingsley Jackson	Episode "Two For Joy"
2017	Liar	Officer Brown	2 episodes
2017	Cormoran Strike	Nico Kolovas-Jones	2 episodes "The Cuckoo's Calling"
2017	Borderline	Tariq Mansoor	6 episodes
2018	Troy: Fall of a City	Xanthius	7 episodes
2018	Urban Myths	Freddie Mercury	Episode: "Backstage at Live Aid"
2019	Urban Myths	Freddie Mercury	Episode: "Princess Diana, Freddie And Kenny – One Normal Night"
2019	London Kills	Alex Barker	Episode: "Sex Games"
2019	Gold Digger	Zac	Episode: "Her Daughter"
2019	Man Like Mobeen	Cal	Episode: "Return of the Pack"
2020	Bancroft	Det. Sup. Jake Harper	3 episodes
2020	Man Like Mobeen	Cal	Episode: "You Reap What You Sow"
2020	Gangs of London	Anthony	4 episodes
2021	We Are Lady Parts	Abdullah	5 episodes
2021	Stath Lets Flats	Bambos	2 episodes
2023	Liaison (TV series)	Charlie Drummond	3 episodes
2023	Domina	Domitius	8 episodes
2025	Death in Paradise	Dale Buckingham	1 episode
2025	How Are You? It's Alan (Partridge)	Craig Gardner	1 episode

=== Film ===
Year	Title	Role	Notes
2010	Fit	Marios	Nominated – Grand Prize Chéries-Chéris – Feature Film
2011	The Inbetweeners Movie	Nicos	Won – Empire Award – Best Comedy; Nominated – Empire Award – Best British Film; Nominated – Evening Standard British Film Award – Blockbuster of the Year
2013	Starred Up	Ashley	Won – BAFTA Awards, Scotland – Best Feature Film; Nominated – British Independent Film Awards – Best British Independent Film
2015	Drift	Bisher	Won – Best Drama at Portobello Film Festival
2015	Kill Your Friends	Fisher	
2016	Criminal	Kebab Clerk	
2016	Mona	Frasier	Won – Grand Prize at Luxor Film Festival
2017	Lost in London	Sayed	Won - Team of the Year Award 2018 / PGGB

== Awards ==
Screen Nation Digital-iS Awards – Favourite Web Series Ensemble – Brothers With No Game

LA Web Festival 2013 – Brothers With No Game – Winner Outstanding Ensemble David Avery, Jay Marsh, Zephryn Taitte and Isaac Sosanya.

Monologue Slam UK – June 2012 Champion
