= Bel Priestley =

English actress and internet celebrity

- Born: 13 May 2003 (age 23); London, England
- Education: Fashion Retail Academy
- Occupations: Actress; YouTuber; TikToker
- Years active: 2022–present

TikTok information
- Page: belpriestley
- Followers: 1.4M
- Last updated: 9 March 2026

Bel Priestley (born 13 May 2003) is an English actress and internet personality. She began her career on the social media platforms YouTube and TikTok, where she documented her gender transition after coming out as a transgender woman. By 2023, she amassed over one million followers on TikTok. Priestly joined the cast of the second season of the British coming-of-age romantic comedy drama television series Heartstopper as the character Naomi Russell. In 2023, she appeared on the covers of Brick Magazine and Attitude. In 2025, she was feature on the cover of Glamour UK.

== Early life and education ==
Priestley began studying musical theatre and dance when she was six years old. She came out as transgender and began her gender transition when she was thirteen years old. She cited the British model Munroe Bergdorf as one of her inspirations for coming out.

She studied fashion in college and attended the Fashion Retail Academy for one week before dropping out. She worked as a cleaner before beginning her entertainment career.

== Career ==
Priestley began her career on the social media platforms YouTube and TikTok, where she documented her gender transition and made makeup and beauty videos. By the time she was nineteen years old, she amassed a TikTok following of over 1.5 million people. She was one of the first openly transgender British women creators on TikTok. On Instagram, she had over 130,000 followers by 2023. On YouTube, she garnered 43,000 followers.

In November 2022, Netflix announced that Priestley would play the role of Naomi Russell in the second season of the British coming-of-age romantic comedy drama series Heartstopper. The second season aired on 3 August 2023. She was the second transgender woman to appear in the show, following her co-star Yasmin Finney who plays Elle Argent.

She is signed with Margravine Management.

In March 2023, Priestly partnered with ASOS and appeared on their Out & Out series for Transgender Day of Visibility. In April of that same year, she joined the Paramount audience-led initiative Generation Change, focused on empowering women.

She was featured on the cover, and in an editorial, of Bricks Magazine in June 2023. That same year, she also appeared on the cover, alongside her Heartstopper co-star Ash Self, of Attitude. In 2025, Priesley was featured on the cover of Glamour UK's Women of the Year alongside Munroe Bergdorf, Ceval Omar, Danielle St James, Maxine Heron, Munya, Taira, Mya Mehmi, and Shon Faye.

== Filmography ==
| Year | Title | Role | Notes | Ref. |
|---|---|---|---|---|
| 2023–2024 | Heartstopper | Naomi Russell | Recurring role | |
| 2026 | Heartstopper Forever | Naomi Russell | Cameo | |
