= Munroe Bergdorf race row incident =

August 2017 controversy regarding advertiser's statements on Facebook

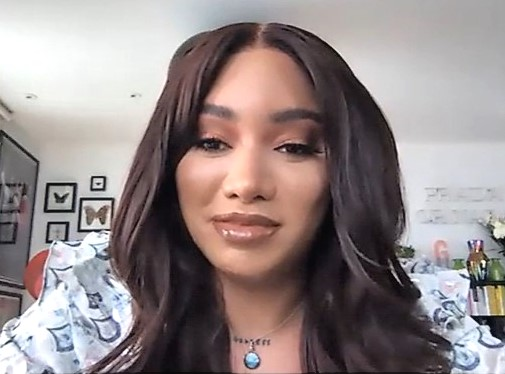

Munroe Bergdorf is a British model who came to public attention in August 2017 when she was employed as the first transgender model to front a L'Oréal campaign in the United Kingdom. Bergdorf attracted further public attention following an article in the Daily Mail highlighting Facebook comments that she—a mixed race trans woman of white English and black Jamaican heritage—had made about white people. These comments—which included the claim that all white people were guilty of "racial violence" and that the white race was "the most violent and oppressive force of nature on Earth"—generated accusations that she was racist against white people. In response to her comments, L'Oréal fired her from its campaign and Facebook removed her posts from their website, regarding them as being in contravention to its rules against hate speech. Bergdorf said she also faced online harassment, much of it of a racist and transphobic nature.

Other commentators argued that the Daily Mail had quoted her out of context, and that her wider point about white supremacy and white privilege in Western societies was valid and needed wider dissemination. Claiming this to be the case, the Illamasqua beauty brand employed her to front its campaign and her supporters followed her suggestion to promote a boycott of L'Oréal.

== Background ==
At the time of the controversy, Bergdorf was aged 29 and living in London. She grew up in Stansted Mountfitchet, Essex, into a middle-class family. Mixed race, she was born the child of a white English mother and an Afro-Jamaican father. She described growing up as a "very effeminate boy" and attending an all-boys school before studying English at the University of Brighton. At this point, she started wearing makeup and heels; she later described herself as having been genderqueer in that period of her life. While in Brighton, she later noted, "I went completely nuts, it was like an internal bomb had gone off and I did everything at once: crazy hair, crazy clothes, reckless behaviour and sex. I was living my teens in my early twenties."

After university, Bergdorf worked for three years in fashion PR. At the age of 24, she decided to undergo transition treatment; her experience transitioning was the subject of an episode of London Live's television show Drag Queens of London. She described experiencing prejudice as a result of being transgender, stating that "I get abuse every day. I've had my dress lifted up, I've been groped, yelled at. I've heard people I thought were friends referring to me as 'shemale' or 'it'. I've been walking down the street and pushed into parked cars." She claims she was raped during this period and the perpetrator was never apprehended, an event which inspired her to take a greater role in social activism; "It wasn't just standing up for rights that were my own... Islamophobia, antisemitism, anything I saw that I didn't think was right, I would protest or post". She subsequently posted about issues like racism and transphobia on social media outlets like Facebook on a regular basis.

Around the same time that she was transitioning, she established a club night called Pussy Palace. She got involved in modelling, stating that she was inspired by the lack of representation of trans women of colour in the industry; "I definitely set out to empower girls like me". Her first modelling job was for a Lebanese couture company. In 2014, the London Evening Standard referred to her as "a cornerstone of London's trans scene." She told the newspaper that she was "so vocal" on trans issues because she sees it as "the new frontier", an issue being brought into public consciousness through the work of trans women like Laverne Cox and Carmen Carrera.

== Controversy ==
Honestly I don't have energy to talk about the racial violence of white people any more. Yes ALL white people... Because most of ya'll don't even realise or refuse to acknowledge that your existence, privilege and success as a race is built on the backs, blood and death of people of colour. Your entire existence is drenched in racism. From micro-aggressions to terrorism, you guys built the blueprint for this s***. Come see me when you realise that racism isn't learned, it's inherited and consciously or unconsciously passed down through privilege. Once white people begin to admit that their race is the most violent and oppressive force of nature on Earth... then we can talk. Until then stay acting shocked about how the world continues to stay f***** at the hands of your ancestors and your heads that remain buried in the sand with hands over your ears.

— Bergdorf's Facebook post

In August 2017, Bergdorf was announced as one of 27 models taking part in L'Oréal UK's "True Match" campaign. This was the first time that the company's UK branch had employed an openly transgender model to front one of its campaigns. On her social media, she declared: "Thank you L’Oréal Paris for giving me this platform. I hope it reaches another little eight-year-old trans girl and makes her feel a little more hopeful and a little less scared about her future, than what was installed in me when I was her age."

On 31 August, the Daily Mail published an article highlighting comments that Bergdorf had made on a Facebook post, describing it as an "extraordinary rant". In this post—written in the wake of the Unite the Right rally in Charlottesville—Bergdorf had stated: "Honestly I don't have energy to talk about the racial violence of white people any more. Yes ALL white people". Her post was also quoted as saying that "Once white people begin to admit that their race is the most violent and oppressive force of nature on Earth... then we can talk." The Daily Mail's revelation went viral, being picked up by international news agencies including The New York Times and Al Jazeera. Various people accused Bergdorf of being racist toward whites; others believed that she raised awareness about white privilege and societal racism.

On 1 September, L'Oréal sacked Bergdorf. They issued a statement that the company "supports diversity and tolerance towards all people irrespective of their race, background, gender and religion" and that Bergdorf's comments about white people were "at odds with those values". Facebook also removed Bergdorf's original post from their website for breaching their policies on hate speech. In the wake of the controversy, Bergdorf described receiving threats of assault, rape, and death. Many comments contained racist, homophobic, and transphobic sentiment; among the comments posted to her social media were statements like "fuck you, stupid dirty and smelly nigga". She later related that as a result of this backlash she did not leave her home for several days, describing it as the worst week of her life.

Publicly replying to L'Oréal's action, Bergdorf stated: "Just know that in tearing me down, you are proving everything that I said to be true". She accused the company of trying to "cash in" on consumers with darker skin tones using rhetoric about "equality and diversity" while at the same time refusing to work towards dismantling the original "source of... discrimination and division" in Western society. She called on people to boycott the brand, and her supporters tweeted the hashtag "boycottLOreal". In solidarity with Bergdorf, the BBC Radio 1 DJ Clara Amfo—who was also part of L'Oréal's campaign—stood down from it. Bergdorf added that The Daily Mail had taken her comments out of context, revealing that when she had originally made the statement "all white people are racist", she was referring to "the fact that western society as a whole is a system rooted in white supremacy - designed to benefit, prioritise and protect white people before anyone of any other race." She also stated that she found it puzzling why many regarded her views as "out of touch or extreme".

=== Public response ===
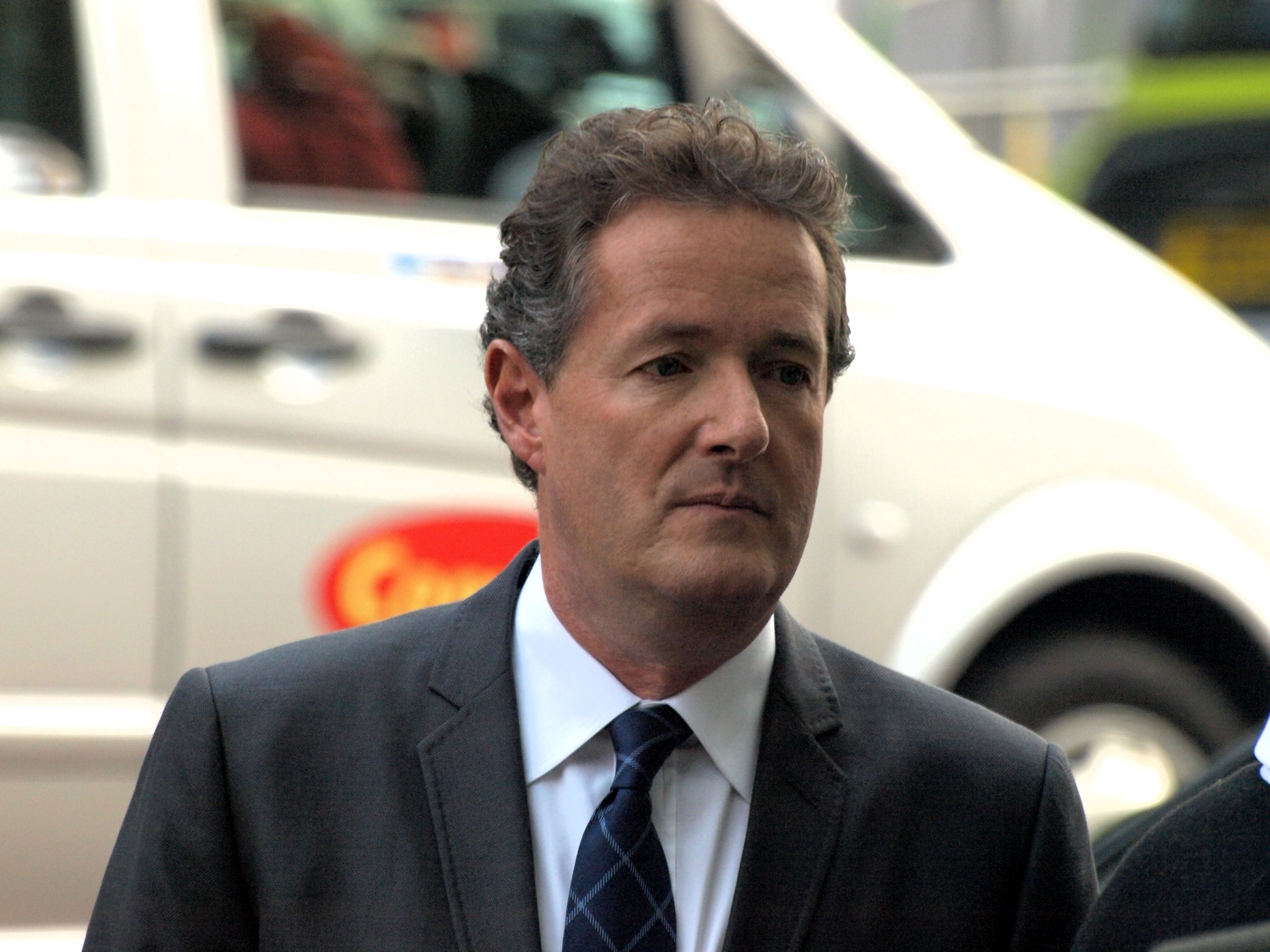
Bergdorf appeared on Good Morning Britain, where she argued with Piers Morgan; he was affronted by her view that he could be considered racist or sexist.

Following her dismissal, Bergdorf appeared on morning television show Good Morning Britain on 4 September. There, she argued with the host Piers Morgan, who disagreed with a number of her views. He claimed to be offended by Bergdorf's suggestion that he, as a white man, was racist or sexist. She followed this with an appearance on the television show Victoria Derbyshire. There, she stated that L'Oréal should not have sacked her and that it was ironic that they dropped her while retaining Cheryl Cole on the same campaign given that the latter had been "actively convicted for punching a black woman", the nightclub toilet attendant Sophie Amogbokpa, in 2003. Cole's representative issued a statement declaring that her employer was "disappointed" at being introduced into the controversy, adding that Cole had been "unanimously acquitted" of having any racial motivations in the 2003 incident.

Writing in an op ed for the i newspaper, India Willoughby stated that—although as a fellow trans woman she sympathised with Bergdorf in many ways—she did not believe that simply being a member of a minority gave Bergdorf "free reign [sic] to insult a large percentage of the population". Criticising Bergdorf for presenting herself as a martyr, Willoughby further chastised "the right-on brigade" for "predictably" presenting the model as the victim of the situation while not "leap[ing] to the defence of the many decent and innocent people Munroe attacked." Writing for The Irish Times, Laura Kennedy stated that while Bergdorf should be free to express "her no doubt well-intended but very divisive and bigoted opinion", L'Oréal should have every right to end its association with her as a result of her statements. Kennedy expressed support for some of Bergdorf's views—such as the need for wider acknowledgment of colonialism—but critiqued what she regarded as the "increasingly popular but very shaky postmodernist and intersectional theory" upon which Bergdorf's arguments relied. Kennedy argued that this form of identity politics classifies "whole swathes of varied individuals into groups" and negates the role of inner-group diversity, individuality, and agency; she believed that it encouraged individuals to make "sweeping judgements" about people by "categorising them as part of my group, or external to it." In turn, she noted, it closely mirrors the logic used by white supremacists and identitarians.

In an op-ed written for The Independent, Otamere Guobadia argued that the controversy surrounding Bergdorf's comments was "part of a long media tradition of painting anti-racism activists, and particularly black women, as irrational anti-white furies", comparing it to the controversy that erupted the previous month following Jason Osamede Okundaye's statement that "all white people are racist". Guobadia added that in sacking Bergdorf, L'Oréal was "contributing to the silencing of anti-racism activists" by ramping up the consequences for those "speaking out against racism" towards people of colour.

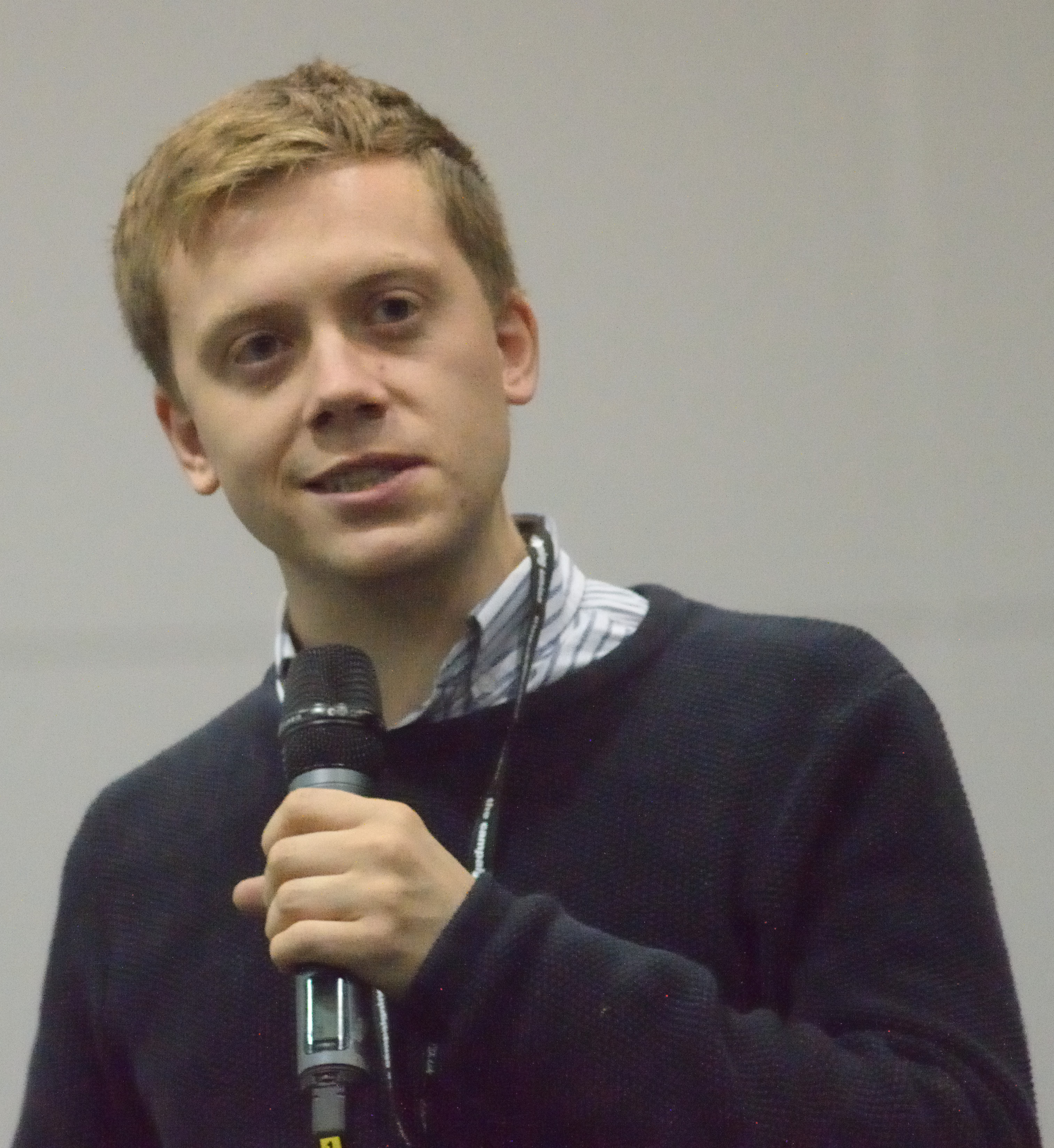
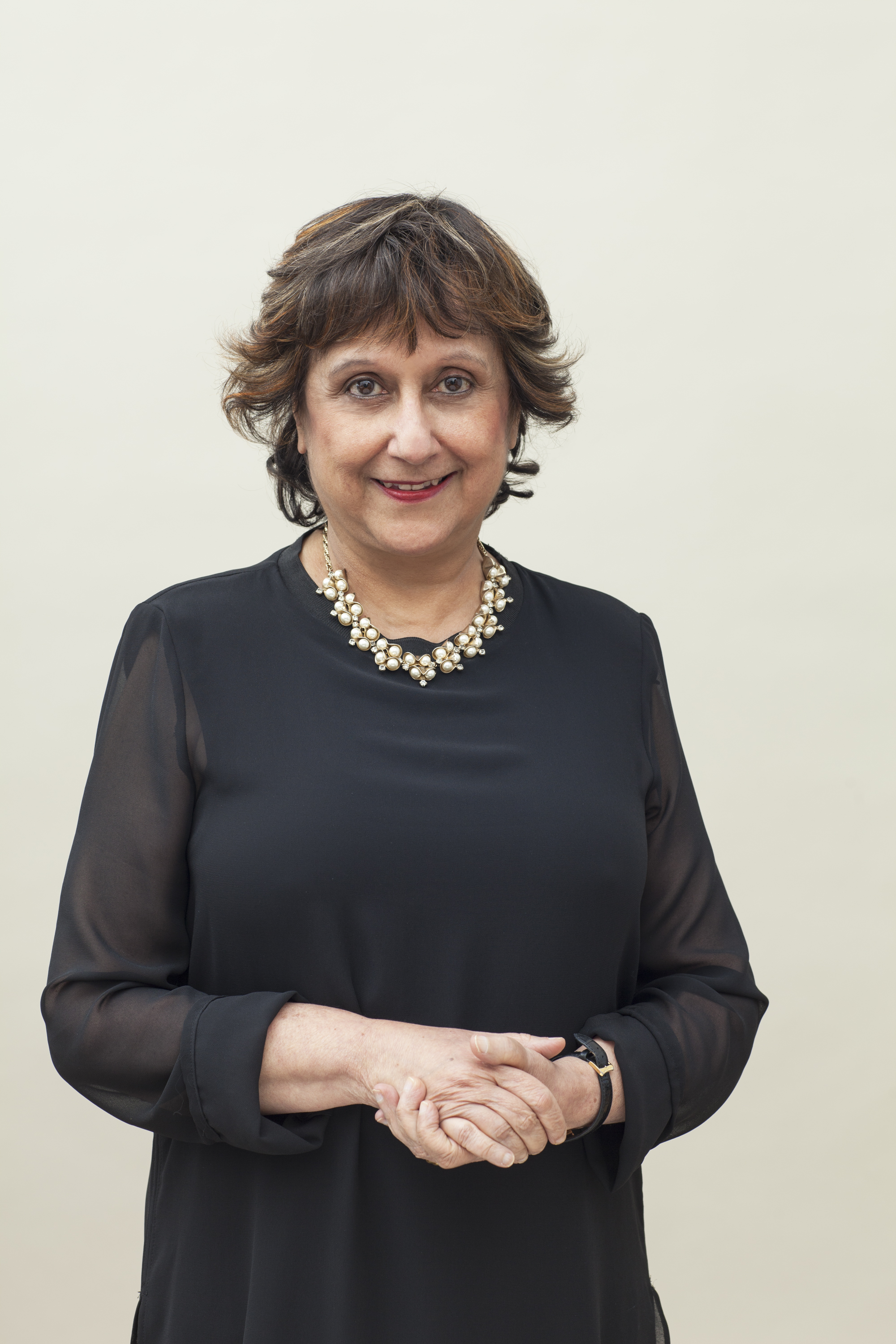
Left-wing columnists Owen Jones and Yasmin Alibhai-Brown were among those claiming that the British right-wing ignored Bergdorf's right to free speech while claiming it for those expressing homophobic or misogynistic sentiment

The commentator Yasmin Alibhai-Brown argued that there was a trend among the British right-wing to defend free speech for white men but not for individuals of other backgrounds. As evidence, she contrasted the way that Bergdorf's comment was received on social media with the way that the politician Jacob Rees-Mogg and conversion therapist Mike Davidson—both white men—had been publicly received after making controversial comments during that same month. Alibhai-Brown stated that in the UK, there was a situation whereby "freedom of speech is a now a right reserved for white toffs and homophobes, bigots and sexists, populists and supremacists. The rest of us must watch what we say, or else." Left-wing commentator Owen Jones concurred; in an article in the Irish Times, he stated that "the right-wing 'free speech' brigade did not proclaim [Bergdorf] was entitled to her opinion" in the same way that it had done for Davidson and other right-wing men.

Writing for the New Statesman, Charlie Brinkhurst-Cuff argued that L'Oréal was "so blinded by gaining profit" that it did not bother to conduct "research into the people" it employed "in the first place". Brinkhurst-Cuff also argued that had the company's staff read Bergdorf's social media posts before hiring her, then they would be well aware of her views. In an interview for The Guardian, Bergdorf stated that L'Oréal were aware that she was an activist when they hired her, and argued that "being an activist means calling people out, not just saying what everyone else is saying and what everyone else wants to think and upholding the common consensus." She insisted that people should avoid what she described as dictionary definitions of "racism" because they were "written a very long time ago and not by a person of colour"; instead she argued that people should use the word "racism" only for "a whole system" upholding the social dominance of white people over people of colour through societal phenomena such as white privilege.

Nosheen Iqbal, who interviewed Bergdorf for The Guardian, suggested that there were many problems facing Bergdorf's desire to promote anti-racist ideas initially generated among academic circles across the wider population. As Iqbal noted, "Not everyone reads Frantz Fanon and Patricia Hill Collins for kicks – academic theory will only go so far in convincing the average person on an average street that institutionalised, systemic racism is just as damaging as a violent, racist attack."

=== Aftermath ===
Later in September, a rival beauty product brand, the UK-based Illamasqua, hired Bergdorf as the face of its Beauty Spotlight campaign, which focuses on gender fluidity. In a statement, the company described Bergdorf as embodying "diversity and individuality; she is not scared to be truly herself." It added that it did not "stand or accept any form of racism, but we also believe Munroe’s comments have been edited out of context by a certain media title (who we won't bother naming) without telling a true story". Bergdorf had also worked for Illamasqua on a previous occasion.

Also in September, Bergdorf gave a verbal performance of Maya Angelou's poem "Still I Rise" for a short film directed by Bec Evans and Laura Kirwan-Ashman. That same month, the scriptwriter Gareth Roberts referenced Bergdorf in a tweet stating: "I [love] how trannies choose names like Munroe, Paris and Chelsea. It's never Julie or Bev is it?". His tweet received headline attention in Britain. Munroe hit back at Roberts on Instagram, stating "Excuse me for not choosing 'Bev' as a name. Do I look like a Bev?". Several days later, she entered a Twitter argument with Morgan. She suggested that it was incongruous that he had not been sacked despite making many controversial statements and yet "somehow a black trans woman calling out [racist] behaviour is a sackable offence". He replied that her LGBT status had nothing to do with her losing her job with L'Oréal, and rather that she had been fired "for calling all white people violent racists", a sacking which he agreed with. After Bergdorf then retweeted Lily Allen's statement "#blockpiersmorgan", he responded: "please do, you insufferable creature".

In December, Bergdorf reappeared on Good Morning Britain as a guest alongside the black writer and broadcaster Edward Adoo, invited to discuss Twitter's newly introduced restrictions on material displaying "hateful conduct". Bergdorf supported Twitter's move, and in the interview repeatedly used the word "nigger". Adoo expressed the view that it was inappropriate to use the term so regularly on breakfast-time television, with co-presenters Morgan and Susanna Reid requesting that Bergdorf cease using it; in turn, she stated that Morgan's attempt to get her to stop was itself "highly racist". On Twitter, many users criticised Bergdorf's use of "nigger"; some stated that they found it offensive, others criticised the perceived double standard in which Bergdorf insisted on her right to use the term, but expressed condemnation of white people doing so. Although acknowledging that to do so on morning television "may raise some eyebrows", after the interview Bergdorf defended her use of "nigger", stating that she did so "for a reason": "I wanted to highlight that the outrage of a black woman saying it around white people is often met with more outrage than the fact that black women in the media are barraged with this word by some white social media users."

In June 2020, during the international George Floyd protests, Bergdorf criticized L'Oréal Paris for posting on Instagram that they stood in solidarity with the Black community, saying that she had never received an apology from L'Oréal. In response, the company announced that they would create and appoint Bergdorf to a U.K. Diversity & Inclusion Advisory Board. Bergdorf shared on Instagram a number of abusive messages she received on that platform following her appointment.

== See also ==
- Bahar Mustafa race row
