= Ilā Kamalagharan =

British artist, vocalist, and electronic music producer

Ilā Kamalagharan, known professionally as ILĀ, is a British artist, vocalist, and electronic music producer from London, United Kingdom.

== Career ==
=== Choral leadership ===
ILĀ is the co-founder of London Contemporary Voices (est. 2010) with Didier Rochard. The choir was initially set up on the behest of Imogen Heap for a special concert at the Royal Albert Hall.

Since then, London Contemporary Voices has collaborated with Grammy-winning artists including Florence + The Machine, U2, and Sam Smith, and appeared at the BBC Proms with various artists in 2017, 2019, and 2024.

ILĀ is also the co-founder of TRANS VOICES (est. 2022) with Coda Nicolaeff, a sister organisation to London Contemporary Voices. Work produced by the organisation includes a Guardian documentary, a Barbican spatial sound installation, and an advertising campaign with Olly Alexander.

=== Mesonoxian and Daffodil ===
In 2016, ILĀ released their debut album Mesonoxian in 2016, which means 'pertaining to midnight', as a response to their father's passing when the artist was in their teens. The album was co-produced with Ingmar Kamalagharan and Cherif Hashizume, with contributions from London Contemporary Voices, Andrew Bird, Manu Delago, and more.

In 2020, ILĀ released Daffodil, a short film that premiered on Nowness. Combining animation by Thomas Rawle with live-action and archival footage from the artist's childhood, the film explores themes of artificial intelligence, consciousness, and identity. The soundtrack features contributions from Ingmar Kamalagharan, Guy Sigsworth, Glenda Allaway, and London Contemporary Voices.

=== Use of emerging technologies ===
Throughout the early 2020s, ILĀ's practice evolved to centre tools at the intersection of voice, artificial intelligence, and quantum computing. The artist describes their process as "an evolving, self-referential dialogue between [artist] and machine".

Building on this, ILĀ released Murmur in 2024 by utilising vocal timbre transfer technology from AI startup Neutone to create hybrid vocal textures. The EP features collaborations with Imogen Heap, Guy Sigsworth, Reeps One, and more.

In 2025, ILĀ released their second album Quantum Computer Music, which draws from the artist's close partnership with quantum startup MOTH, employing quantum algorithms and computing principles throughout. Quantum Computer Music features "RECURSE", a composition that continuously generates itself in real-time without repetition using quantum reservoir computing.

=== Advisory engagement ===
ILĀ a member of the Ivors Academy Future Sound Experience Council, Brian Eno's Earth/Percent Music Committee, and a research partner on AI and music at the University of Sheffield. They have presented work at Harvard University, University of Oxford, the World Economic Forum, TED Countdown Summit, and venues such as the Barbican (London), Silencio (Paris), and Puzzle X (Barcelona).

In 2025, ILĀ curated Transpose: SUBVERSE at the Barbican, which received critical acclaim from Attitude.

== Personal life ==
ILĀ has identified as non-binary, using "they" and "she" pronouns.

== Discography ==
=== Albums ===
Album	Details
Mesonoxian	Released 28 October 2016 Label: Relative State Records
Quantum Computer Music	Released 28 November 2025 Label: Relative State Records

=== EPs ===
EP	Details
Murmur	Released 13 December 2024 Label: Relative State Records
Daffodil	Released 6 November 2020 Label: Relative State Records

=== Features ===
Album	Artist	Details	Track
Silver Kobalt	Manu Delago	Released 6 April 2015 Label: Tru Thoughts	"Drumheart"
STET	Guy Sigsworth	Released 17 May 2019 Label: Mercury KX	"Barely Breaking Even" "Lydian" "Dorian"
Sea Souls	Anna Phoebe	Released 3 September 2021 Label: Eat the Peach	"Sirens"
HUMANiSE	HAAi	Released 10 October 2025 Label: Mute Records	"Satellite (Intro)" "Satellite" "Rushing (Intro)" "Rushing" "New Euphoria"
