= Munroe Bergdorf =

British model and activist

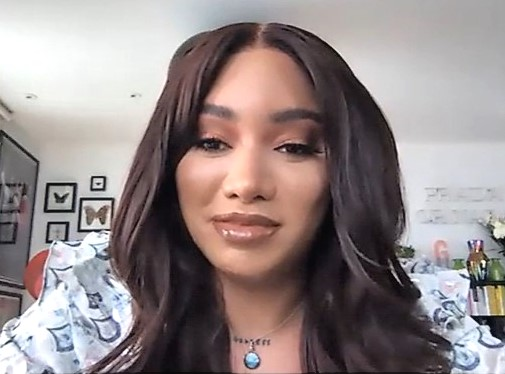
- Bergdorf in 2021
- Born: 11 September 1987 (age 39); Stansted Mountfitchet, Essex, England
- Occupations: Model; activist
- Years active: 2014–present
- Website: mbergdorf.com

Munroe Bergdorf (née Beaumont; born 11 September 1987) is an English model and activist. She has walked several catwalks for brands including Gypsy Sport at both London and NYC Fashion Weeks. Bergdorf was the first transgender model in the UK for L'Oréal, but was dropped within weeks after a racial row. In February 2018, she was appointed as an LGBT adviser to the Labour Party, but resigned the following month. Bergdorf appeared in the Channel 4 documentary What Makes a Woman, which aired in May 2018.

Bergdorf won 'Changemaker of the Year' at the 2018 Cosmopolitan Awards, and was awarded an honorary doctorate in 2019 by the University of Brighton. She joined UN Women UK as an advocate in 2019, supporting its #DrawALine campaign, seeking to end female genital mutilation (FGM).

== Early life ==
Bergdorf was born and grew up in Stansted Mountfitchet, Essex. Bergdorf is of mixed ancestry, born to a Jamaican father and an English mother. Bergdorf, who was assigned male at birth, attended Bentfield County Primary School in Stansted Mountfitchet and then The Bishop's Stortford High School, an all-boys' school. Bergdorf describes growing up as a "very effeminate boy". Later, she studied English at the University of Brighton, describing herself there as genderqueer.

Bergdorf then worked for three years in fashion PR. At the age of 24, Bergdorf began gender transitioning, and was the subject of an episode of London Live show Drag Queens of London.

Around the same time that Bergdorf was transitioning, she co-founded nightclub Pussy Palace.

== Modelling ==
Bergdorf became involved in modelling after being motivated by the lack of diversity in the industry. Her first modelling job was for a Lebanese couture company. In 2014, the London Evening Standard referred to her as "a cornerstone of London's trans scene." She told the newspaper that she was "so vocal" on trans issues because she sees it as "the new frontier", an issue being brought into public consciousness through the work of trans women like Laverne Cox and Carmen Carrera.

She came to public attention in August 2017 when she was employed as the first transgender model to front a L'Oréal campaign in the UK, being announced as one of 27 models taking part in L'Oréal UK's "True Match" campaign. On her social media, she stated: "Thank you L'Oréal Paris for giving me this platform. I hope it reaches another little eight-year-old trans girl and makes her feel a little more hopeful and a little less scared about her future, than what was installed [sic] in me when I was her age." Elsewhere she stated: "I definitely set out to empower girls like me."

=== Racial controversy ===
In February 2017, Bergdorf stated that "all white people as a group are brought up racist", stating: "most of y'all don't even realise or refuse to acknowledge that your existence, privilege and success as a race is built on the backs, blood and death of people of colour." Bergdorf attracted further public attention following an article in The Daily Mail highlighting Facebook comments that she had made, which included the claim that all white people were guilty of "racial violence" and that the white race was "the most violent and oppressive force of nature on Earth." In response to Bergdorf's comments, L'Oréal dropped her from their campaign on 1 September 2017. They issued a statement that the company "supports diversity and tolerance towards all people irrespective of their race, background, gender and religion" and that Bergdorf's comments about white people were "at odds with those values". Facebook removed her posts from their website, regarding them as being in contravention to its rules against hate speech. Bergdorf said that she also faced online harassment, much of it of a racist and transphobic nature. Other commentators argued that The Daily Mail had quoted her out of context, and that her wider point about white supremacy and white privilege in Western societies was valid and needed wider dissemination. Bergdorf defended her position, arguing that she was angry after the scenes at the Unite the Right rally in Charlottesville and wanted to explain that racism was systemic, and that being racist was not just about attacking people, but failing to take action against the system. She added: "I don't see how calling out the roots of racism, somehow makes you a racist", calling the controversy the "worst time of my life".

In September 2017, the UK-based Illamasqua hired Bergdorf as the face of its Beauty Spotlight campaign, which concerned gender fluidity. In a statement, the company described Bergdorf as embodying "diversity and individuality; she is not scared to be truly herself." It added that it did not "stand or accept any form of racism, but we also believe Munroe's comments have been edited out of context by a certain media title (who we won't bother naming) without telling a true story".

In June 2020, during the international George Floyd protests, Bergdorf criticized L'Oréal Paris for posting on Instagram that they stood in solidarity with the Black community, saying that she had never received an apology from L'Oréal. In response, the company announced that they would create and appoint Bergdorf to a UK Diversity & Inclusion Advisory Board. Bergdorf shared on Instagram a number of abusive messages she received on that platform following her appointment.

== Activism ==
The same month she was hired by Illamasqua, Bergdorf recited Maya Angelou's poem "Still I Rise" for a short film directed by Bec Evans and Laura Kirwan-Ashman.

In February 2018, she was appointed as an LGBT adviser to the Labour Party, which she resigned from the following month after homophobic and misogynistic Twitter posts from 2010 received attention. Bergdorf apologised for her past comments. Bergdorf later blamed "Conservative media" for using her as a "political pawn to bring down Jeremy Corbyn" and that the Labour LGBT advisory board was being targeted to be shut down, stating "when I left they went after somebody else, and then when that person left they went after somebody else" in order to "discredit Jeremy Corbyn".

As of April 2019, she has made frequent appearances as a guest commentator on ITV's Good Morning Britain and This Morning.

In June 2019, Bergdorf was stripped of her role as an ambassador for Childline two days after being appointed, when journalist Janice Turner and others questioned her suitability for the post by accusing her of having modelled for adult magazine Playboy. Turner also called Bergdorf a "porn model". In response, Bergdorf denied ever participating in porn, and stated that it was wrong to demonize persons that do in any case. Several days later, the NSPCC offered Bergdorf a "full, frank and unreserved apology" for the way in which it had handled her dismissal. The NSPCC's CEO, Peter Wanless, explained that Bergdorf had been dismissed 'because of her public statements, which we felt would mean that she was in breach of our own risk assessments and undermine what we are here to do'.

In February 2021, Bergdorf deleted her Twitter account, releasing a public statement asking when social media companies will "clamp down" on transphobia. Bergdorf stated: "No one should have to endure even a fraction of the abuse that I am exposed to and have to put up with on a daily basis," and concluded that she was "tired of being a punching bag. Twitter is not a safe app for transgender people."

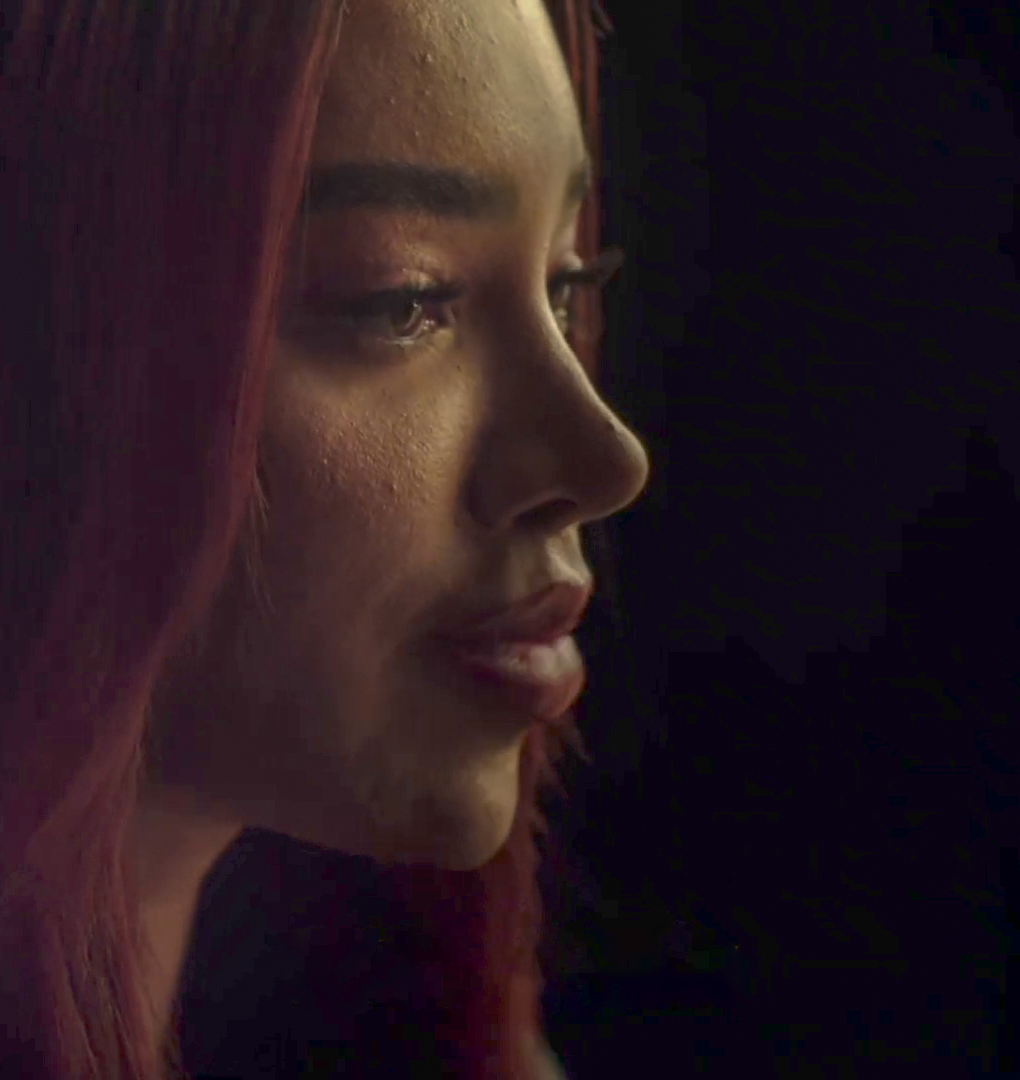
Bergdorf participating in a plea to end the Gaza genocide, 2024

She participated in a plea to end the Gaza genocide in 2024 and the Together For Palestine concert in 2025.

== Writing and other ventures ==
In 2023, Bergdorf published her book Transitional. In 2025, she published her book Talk to Me.

Bergdorf presents Queerpiphany on MTV UK.

Bergdorf hosts the podcast The Way We Are.

Bergdorf's documentary, Love & Rage, premiered in the UK in June 2025.

== Honours and recognition ==
In July 2019, Bergdorf was awarded an honorary doctorate from the University of Brighton in recognition of her campaigning for transgender rights.

In November 2021, Bergdorf was recognised as British Community Trailblazer at the fifth annual Gay Times Honours celebration in London. She was presented the award by Ellie Goulding and also featured as one of the cover stars for the Honours edition of the magazine. Having been named Changemaker of the Year in 2018 by Cosmopolitan UK, she became the first transgender person to feature on the front cover of that magazine with its 50th anniversary issue, published on 21 January 2022.

In November 2023, UN Women named Bergdorf as its first UK Champion.

In 2025, she was featured on the cover of Glamour UK' as one of the Women of the Year, alongside others including Bel Priestley, Danielle St James, Mya Mehmi and Shon Faye.
