= Christopher Amos (director) =

Australian-British filmmaker and producer

- Born: Christopher Amos
- Other name: Chris Amos
- Occupations: Filmmaker; director; writer; producer
- Years active: 1997–present
- Known for: Hating Peter Tatchell
- Website: chrysaor.com.au

Christopher Amos (also known as Chris Amos) is an Australian-British filmmaker, director, writer, and producer. He is most noted for his 2021 documentary feature Hating Peter Tatchell, which was released globally on Netflix and featured Ian McKellen and Stephen Fry, with Elton John and David Furnish as executive producers. For his work on the film, Amos received a nomination for Best Director at the Australian Directors' Guild Awards and a nomination for Best Documentary at the Screen Producers Australia Awards.

Amos is the founder of Chrysaor Studios on the Gold Coast, described as Australia's first social enterprise film studio, which received a Capital Grant from the government agency Screen Queensland in 2024.

== Career ==
=== UK publishing and venues ===
Prior to his work in film, Amos was the Editor-in-Chief of the United Kingdom's Bent Magazine, a lifestyle publication for gay men.

In 2012, Amos founded the London nightclub Manbar in Soho. The venue attracted media coverage for commissioning a mural depicting a topless Prince Harry. The venue gained further media attention in 2013 when it joined an international boycott of Russian vodka in protest against the country's anti-gay laws. After a dispute with Westminster City Council over its entertainment licence, Manbar closed in January 2015.

=== Filmmaking ===
In 2015, Amos was a producer on the documentary Dressed as a Girl, which followed the lives of performers in East London's alternative drag scene.

In 2021, Amos wrote, directed, and produced the feature documentary Hating Peter Tatchell, which chronicles the life of human rights activist Peter Tatchell. The film features interviews conducted by Sir Ian McKellen and commentary from Stephen Fry, with Elton John and David Furnish serving as executive producers. Produced with WildBear Entertainment, the documentary premiered at the Melbourne International Film Festival before being released globally on Netflix. The film received positive reviews, with City AM describing it as a profile of "an anarchic hero" and Gay City News noting the film's detailed portrayal of activism. The Canberra Times praised the work of "Australian/British writer-director Christopher Amos" in covering Tatchell's life story. For his work, Amos was nominated for Best Director at the Australian Directors' Guild Awards, and the film was nominated for Best Documentary at the Screen Producers Australia Awards. The documentary won the Audience Award at the Queer Screen Sydney Mardi Gras Film Festival in 2022 and the People's Choice Award at the Montreal International Documentary Festival in 2021.

In 2024, Amos expanded into film distribution through his company Chrysaor, acquiring the Australian and New Zealand rights for the Academy Award-nominated documentary Four Daughters. According to IF Magazine, the move was prompted by a desire to ensure significant international documentaries received a theatrical release in the region.

=== Industry recognition ===
Amos has participated in several competitive industry development programs. In 2022, he was selected for Screen Producers Australia's 'Ones to Watch' cohort, where he was mentored by showrunner Tony Ayres. In 2023, he was one of 18 practitioners nationally to receive Screen Australia's Enterprise funding, which supported a three-month placement at World of Wonder, the production company behind RuPaul's Drag Race, in Los Angeles.

== Filmography ==
Year	Title	Role	Notes
2015	Dressed as a Girl	Producer	Documentary
2021	Hating Peter Tatchell	Director, Writer, Producer	Documentary; Netflix release
2024	Four Daughters	Distributor (ANZ)	Documentary; Academy Award-nominated
