= Brothers With No Game =

British comedy-drama series

- Genre: Comedy-drama
- Created by: Leon Mayne, Paul Samuel, Masibu Manima, Henry Oladele
- Written by: Leon Mayne
- Directed by: Leon Mayne, Paul Samuel
- Country of origin: United Kingdom
- No. of seasons: 3
- No. of episodes: 23

Original release
- Release: 31 March 2014

Brothers With No Game

YouTube information
- Channel: BrothersWithNoGame
- Years active: 2012—2020
- Subscribers: 19.4 thousand
- Views: 1.79 million
- Last updated: 15 December 2025

Brothers With No Game is a British comedy-drama web and television series, broadcast on London Live, as well as on a number of global streaming platforms, including EcoNet, AfroStream and TRACE Play. The series follows the social and romantic lives of four childhood friends, facing a ‘quarter-life crisis’. The 20-somethings come to terms with the responsibilities and dilemmas that revolve around work, family, friendship and women.

== Development ==
Brothers With No Game began as a blog in 2010 featuring comedic takes on life's dilemmas. In 2012, the blog was developed into a YouTube web series, partly crowdfunded by fans of the blog via Indiegogo.

The UK broadcasting rights were acquired by London Live TV Channel in 2014, and the show was broadcast on the channel's launch night.

The show has since gone on to reach a wider global audience through distribution across Africa, Caribbean and Europe via Econet and TRACE.

== Characters ==
Jay Marsh plays Theo Barrett, a marketer for a multimedia company. He is what many would say the epitome of what a "Brother With No Game" is. Bubbly, animated and a self-confessed geek, he is seen as the proverbial good gentleman of the group, and, as a result, he can't seem to find a woman that he is compatible with. Theo has a confusing relationship with school friend Simone, with fans vocally unsure whether there is more to them than just friendship. Humble, likable, yet with a hint of naivety, this character provides a necessary balance to the four main friends.

Zephryn Taitte portrays Dorian Kerr, an accountant who works with Theo at the same multimedia company. Intelligent and well-read, he assumes the role of life analyst and often uses his interest in psychology and conspiracy theories to theorise on just about everything. His love for Arsenal Football Club rivals his hate for work, especially his boss Michael who he shares awkward competitive scenes with. Dorian dates a number of women despite being picky, yet his heart lies with childhood friend Lisa, who he subsequently fails to make his girlfriend for most of the series.

David Avery plays Marcus Graham, a men's fashion magazine intern turned content editor. Charismatic, confident and cocky with self-proclaimed good looks, he is the charmer among the friends. He likes his women to complement his attempted lifestyle and often goes for the fashionable, high maintenance and trophy types. His necessity to lie about who he is to get women almost always backfires on him in the long run, with his conquests in the series ranging from crazy to young.

Isaac Sosanya plays Junior Casey Owusu, a freelance IT Consultant. He is funny and social, but collected, making him both the quietest and the joker of the group. Junior's confidence is dealt a blow at the start of the series, as we find him still reeling from his breakup with childhood sweetheart Vanessa. He subsequently dates Remy and builds a relationship with her until Vanessa comes back into his life. Junior spends the series contending with his choices and the effects they have on his life and those around him life.

Natalie Duvall plays Lisa Bowman, a teacher and part-time events organiser. She is often referred to as the mother hen, as she loves to bring all her friends together to cook for them. She is a hopeless romantic, always trying to hook up the guys and longs for a relationship of her own. During the series Lisa drops clues for Dorian that she wants to be with him, but it has yet to materialise. She subsequently goes on to date Leon in the series.

Dani Moseley plays Simone Charles, a heralded youth worker in her community. Alongside Lisa she is a childhood friends of the guys. Feisty and not one to mince her words she is often seen as aggressive and snobbish of men, however as the series progresses we see she is merely guarding herself from being hurt again after breaking up with another old school friend, Darren.

Ashley Bannerman plays Remy Ademola, a relationship blogger and author. Remy is introduced to the series as a feisty speed-date, heavily critical and analytical on the guys she comes across. She wins a date with Junior and a relationship blossoms. She is focused, witty and personable and brings a whole new dimension to Junior.

Nemide May plays Vanessa Leanne, writer and actress. She joins the series at the Season 1 finale, coming back into Junior's life after an untimely break-up. She is meticulous, intelligent and very sweet but has a menacing side when she doesn't get what she wants. She spends the series trying to win Junior back, after realising he may not be as over as her as he claims.

Solomon Israel plays Darren Dickson, an old school friend of the guys. He is confident, a jokester and spontaneous, often wanting to go out on wild nights and trips. He is introduced to the series as Simone's ex-boyfriend and we soon learn about his uncommitted dynamic with women. He represents the guy Marcus wants to be. The source of Darren's regular income is unknown and despite his womanising ways, he takes great pride in having fun and making people happy.

== Season synopsis ==
=== Season 1 ===
The first season introduces the four main characters and three supporting characters. Theo is having difficulties finding the "right woman", with his workmate Nicole taking advantage of his good nature and Simone making fun of his masculinity. He finds solace in Charlotte, a singer who he meets at a cashpoint and a relationship blossoms. Marcus begins dating Nia off of the back of a lie about his job role, yet refuses to confess his relationship with her to his friends. A strange turn of events reveal that he's not the only one lying in their rendezvous. Dorian is struggling with work, women and his feelings towards Lisa. He attempts and fails throughout the season to tell Lisa how he really feels until there is a threat to her singledom, when a man enters the fray. Junior spends most of the season unable to get over his ex-girlfriend Vanessa, until he meets Remy at a speed dating event. A relationship blossoms between them but his ex-girlfriend shows up and gives him an ultimatum.

=== Season 2 ===
The second season begins with Junior making a decision between Remy and Vanessa. After telling Vanessa he chooses Remy, Vanessa presents him with an offer he can't refuse. We spend the season wondering what happened between them until the finale when Vanessa confesses to Remy exactly what that something was. Marcus breaks up with Nia and finally gets a full-time role for his company. He befriends Michelle, a co-worker he eventually has feelings for but is thwarted by the return of Darren, who visits him and gets the attention of Michelle. Marcus goes to a club with Dorian and Darren and meets Sinitta, a sexy and voluptuous teacher who is potentially more of a threat to Marcus than a conquest. Theo flies to Jamaica for a family wedding after being given the boot by Charlotte, he delays his return to London after finding himself a suitable girlfriend finally. He returns to London for the season finale with his girlfriend Monique, but she may be having second thoughts on whether she wants to come back home for good. Dorian and Lisa reluctantly agree to be friends and he begins dating Shirene but it comes to an abrupt halt when they have an impromptu double date with Lisa and her new boyfriend Leon. Dorian befriends a new girl at Marcus’ surprise birthday party and they begin dating, but when Leon proposes to Lisa unexpectedly in the series finale, Dorian's feelings come to the forefront.

=== Season 3 ===
According to the production company BWNG Ltd website, Season 3 picks up where Season 2 left off, with Junior, Dorian and Theo having to answer tough questions about their current life situations...and fast. Joined by good old friend Darren, the season explores the challenges of being "actual adults" – since the past decade, has been filled with mediocrity and lack of commitment. The show is scheduled to be broadcast on TRACE Play, in the summer of 2017.

== Impact ==
=== Critical reception ===
Elizabeth Pears of The Voice Newspaper celebrated the positive imagery of young males by describing the show as "a voice that reflected a generation of young black men in their 20s – who weren’t locked in a cycle of gang rivalries." In 2012, the show was featured on US cable show 'The Attack Show' by Baratunde Thurston, with positive feedback from the panel consisting of Senior Writer of Entertainment Weekly, Anthony Breznican and Editor In Chief of Birth.Movies.Death Devin Faraci. Devin Faraci commented that the show was 'actually good (I'd say it's the only good thing recommended in the segment).' Anthony Breznican goes on to respond "I think its great, but also it is very British. It’s not just about black culture, but it's also about being a young British guy…"

As the series progressed, Brothers With No Game received National press coverage in The Guardian, with the writer asking the question of why the show was not on UK television, despite its success online.

In 2014, the main cast of Brothers With No Game were featured on BBC Radio 1xtra with Nick Bright, where each actor speed dated with the guest host Sian Anderson.

In May 2017, academic research on screen comedy audiences featured a chapter on the show and its audience in the context of 'the marginalisation of blackness on British television'. Screen Comedy and Online Audiences, by Dr Inger-Lise Kalviknes Bore, also looks at how online distribution is providing alternative spaces for the development of black-centred narratives.

=== Awards ===
The Brothers With No Game received positive feedback from the industry whilst on YouTube, going on to win 6 awards at the LA Web Festival in 2012. The show went on to win more accolades, most notably winning Best Ensemble and Best Actor award for Zephryn Taitte, at the 2014 Screen Nation Digital-iS media award.

== Distribution ==
Seasons 1 and 2 of Brothers With No Game were aired on YouTube in June 2012, and as of May 2015 the channel has received 1.12m views. In 2014, the web series were re-edited from 15 episodes to 13 TV length content following the London Live acquisition of the rights to broadcast in the UK.

The show was broadcast at 11pm on the night of London Live launch, receiving the second highest viewer ratings on that night and highest for original scripted content.

In late 2015, the creators announced Seasons 1 & 2 was also being broadcast on French speaking platform 'Afrostream'.

In October 2016, the creators teased the return of Season 3 of Brothers With No Game on Instagram with a picture of a script and post-it note with the words 'TRACE PLAY' suggesting a new home for the series.
