= Borderline (2016 TV series) =

- The cast of Borderline, as seen in the opening sequence. From left to right: Agent Tariq Mansoor, Senior Agent Grant Brodie, Chief Inspector Linda Proctor, Agent Andrea "Andy" Church, and Agent Clive Hassler.
- Genre: Mockumentary
- Written by: Chris Gau; Michael Orton-Toliver
- Directed by: Matt Jones
- Starring: David Avery; Jackie Clune; David Elms; Liz Kingsman; Jamie Michie
- Narrated by: Ralf Little
- Country of origin: United Kingdom
- Original language: English
- No. of series: 2
- No. of episodes: 12

Production
- Executive producers: Sarah Doole; Chris Gau; Ralf Little; Michael Orton-Toliver
- Producer: Zoë Rocha
- Running time: 28 minutes
- Production company: Little Rock Pictures

Original release
- Network: Channel 5
- Release: 2 August 2016 – 19 October 2017

Borderline is a British mockumentary television comedy series devised by Michael Orton-Toliver and Chris Gau. Narrated by Ralf Little, the series launched on 2 August 2016 on Channel 5. The series follows the activity of customs agents working for Borderline, a fictionalised version of the Border Force, at the fictional Northend Airport.

In contrast to most series, which require the cast to memorise a script, Borderline is "retro-scripted": the cast is given a plot outline to guide them as they improvise their dialogue and actions.

As of December 2016, the series is available on Netflix in select regions.

== Production ==
In February 2016, it was announced that Channel 5 had ordered a new comedy series. The news was revealed by Royle Family star Ralf Little.

The first series was filmed at Coventry Airport in March/April 2016.

In August 2016, during the first series run it was announced by Ben Frow (Channel 5's Director of Programming) that the show had been commissioned for a second series.

== Cast ==
=== Main ===
- David Avery as Customs Agent Tariq Mansoor
- Jackie Clune as Chief Customs Inspector Linda Proctor
- David Elms as Customs Agent Clive Hassler
- Liz Kingsman as Customs Agent Andrea "Andy" Church
- Jamie Michie as Senior Customs Agent Grant Brodie

=== Recurring ===
- Guz Khan as Mo
- Sunil Patel as Sujan Stevens
- Manoj Anand as Kareem Khan (series 1)
- Alan Faulkner as David Thompson (series 1)
- Patricia Drabble as Fran Lewis (series 1)
- Guy Normas as Steve Marks (series 1)
- Cameron Moon as Sheikh Mohammed (series 1)
- Paulina Boneva as Zara Lewis (series 2)

=== Notable guest ===
- Mark Addy as himself (series 1)
- Jamie Demetriou as DJ Stefano Rocco (series 1)
- Kerry Howard as Stacey Allen (series 1)
- Jayde Adams as Celeste Ferguson (series 1)
- Kris Marshall as Baron (series 2)
- Elizabeth Berrington as Mary Parfitt (series 2)
- Josie Lawrence as Eleanor Wilson (series 2)

== Cancellation ==
On 19 October 2017, Channel 5 had announced Borderline would not return for its third series due to a drop in ratings and just 12 episodes were produced in two series.
