= Fashion Retail Academy =

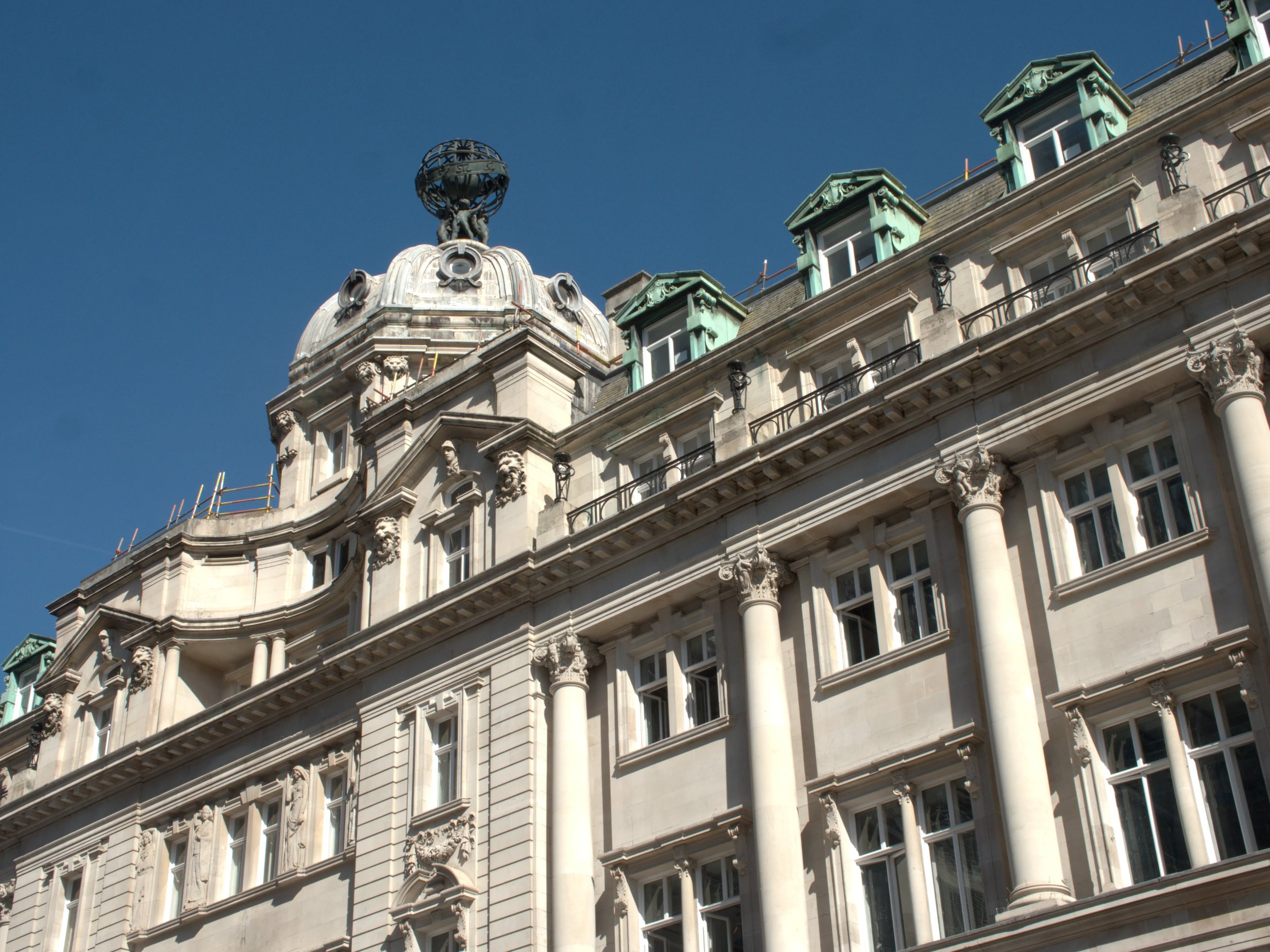

Location
- Electra House, 84 Moorgate; London, EC2M 6SE; United Kingdom; 51°31′04″N 0°05′18″W

Information
- Type: Vocational training college
- Motto: Home of Fashion's Next Generation
- Established: 1 August 2005
- Department for Education URN: 135800 Tables
- Ofsted: Reports
- Head teacher: Lee Lucas
- Gender: Mixed
- Age: 16+
- Enrolment: 2,000+
- Website: fashionretailacademy.ac.uk

The Fashion Retail Academy is a vocational training college in the Moorgate area of London, England.

It was founded as a National Skills Academy in 2005 by M&S, Next, Experian, F&F and Arcadia, with funding from the UK government. Philip Green, chairman of the Arcadia Group, contributed between £5 million and £12 million. It opened in 2006 with about 200 students, and has since taught over 12,000 students.

The Fashion Retail Academy trains people to work in head office roles within the fashion industry, working with over 140 UK brands and retailers to provide industry enrichment like work experience. Diploma courses run from six months to two years, and undergraduate degree courses are condensed across two years. They also offer fashion and retail apprenticeships. In 2022, the Academy launched specialist online courses.

In April 2017, students from the college took part in the Future Retail Challenge at the World Retail Congress in Dubai.

Molly-Mae Hague, an English social media influencer and runner-up in the fifth series of reality dating show Love Island, studied at the Fashion Retail Academy. She has been the creative director of fashion brand PrettyLittleThing since 2021. In her recent book publication, she referred to her time at the academy as "probably one of the best decisions of my life. It was such an amazing two years, I had so much fun." Social media influencer and actress Bel Priestley studied at the academy but later dropped out.

Several alumni have also been chosen as part of Drapers 30 Under 30 including Thom Scherdel, a buyer at The Idle Man, in 2015 and Alannah Gold, international digital trading manager at River Island, in 2022.

In August 2024, the Fashion Retail Academy announced that it had appointed its first Patron, Lord Rose of Monewden. Lord Rose was CEO of Marks & Spencer, one of the Academy's founding partners, when it opened in 2005.

== The Mayor's Skills Academies Quality Mark ==
In 2022, the Fashion Retail Academy was awarded two Mayor's Skills Academies Quality Marks for education provision within the Creative Sector and the Digital Sector.

Launched in March 2022 by the Mayor of London and the London Assembly, the Mayor's Skills Academies Quality Mark is an annual accreditation that identifies and recognises high-quality skills training providers in London. The Quality Mark covers six priority sectors that are considered key for London's recovery and long-term economic growth. The Quality Mark is designed to help learners find industry-relevant skills provision across the city of London.

== Academic Partnership with Falmouth University ==
Fashion Retail Academy is classed as a "listed body" on the UK Government website, meaning that it cannot award degrees; students at a listed body may receive their degrees from a "recognised body", one authorised to award degrees.

The Academy has a partnership with Falmouth University.

== Location ==
In 2024, the Academy moved to Electra House in Moorgate. The building was previously occupied by London Metropolitan University, and is currently undergoing a £21 million refurbishment.

== 10-Year Anniversary ==
In 2015, the Fashion Retail Academy held a 10-Year Anniversary and Awards Ceremony at Freemason's Hall in Convent Garden. The event was attended by celebrities including Philip Green, Tony Blair, Vernon Kay, Tess Daly, Ciara and Paloma Faith.
