= Desmond is Amazing =

Child drag performer (born 2007)

Desmond Napoles
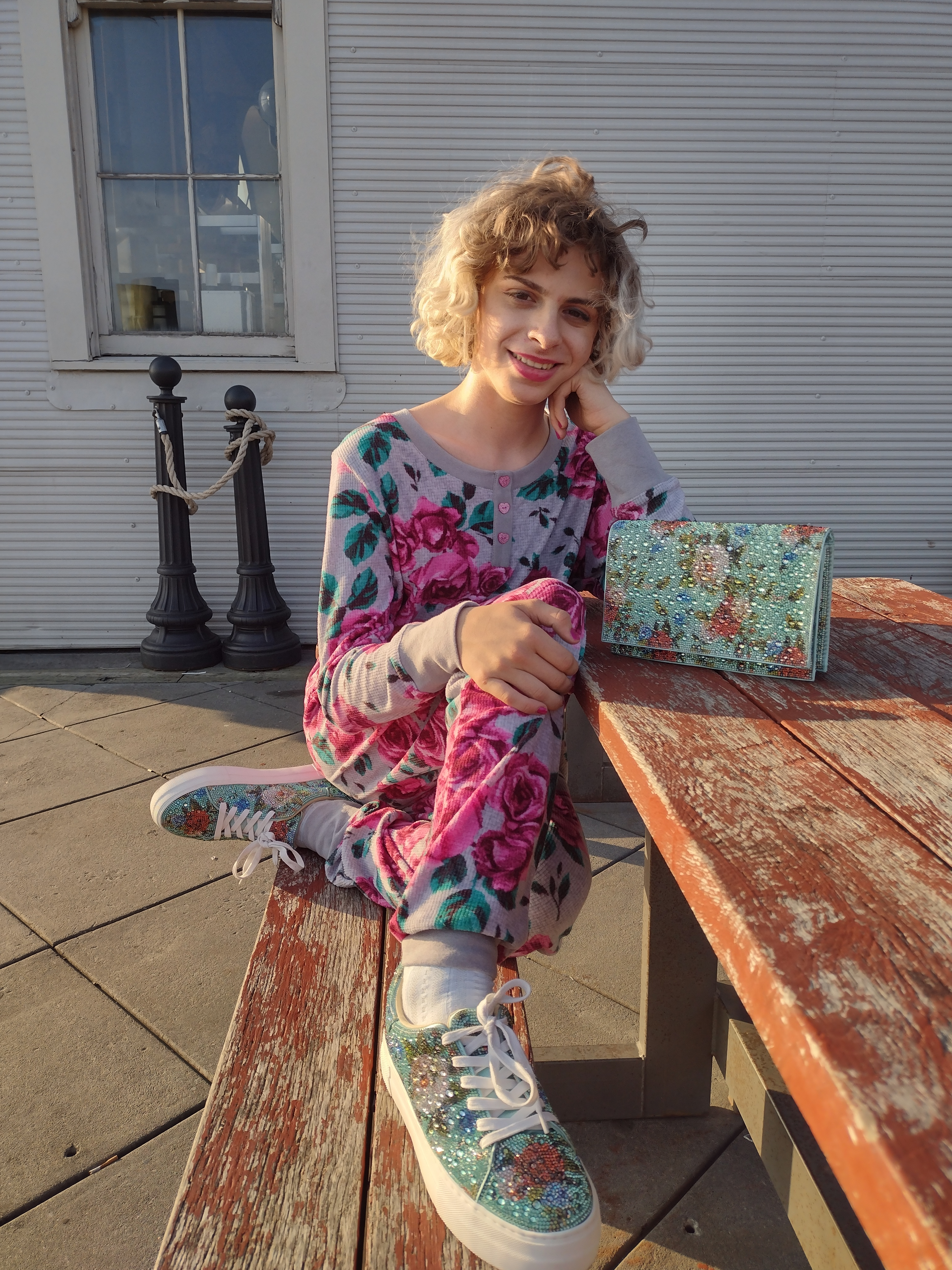
- Desmond Napoles in Battery Park in 2023
- Born: June 2007 (age 19)
- Known for: Drag performance, LGBTQ activism
- Website: desmondisamazing.com

Desmond Napoles (born 2007) is an American former child drag performer known by the stage name Desmond is Amazing. Napoles has been performing since they (Note: Napoles is genderfluid and uses they/them pronouns.) were eight years old and is an LGBTQ activist.

== Work ==
Napoles received early attention when they appeared in the 2015 NYC Pride March, and has been doing drag since the age of eight. As of 2019, Napoles had around 180,000 followers on Instagram, and had the largest online presence of American "drag kids".

In October 2017, Napoles announced they would be organizing Haus of Amazing, the first drag club for child drag performers. In 2018, Napoles walked in Gypsy Sport's New York Fashion Week show. Be Amazing: A History of Pride, a children's picture book with text by Napoles, was published in 2020.

A 2022 appearance at a Bronx library was cancelled due to violent threats against the Napoles family. In a March 2023 interview, Napoles said that they were retiring their drag persona and had instead begun working on a line of skin care products. Napoles has started a fashion brand, Be Amazing NYC, and is a LGBTQ+ influencer. As of 2024, they use the name Desi.

== Personal life ==
In 2018, Napoles lived in Brooklyn, and lives in New York City as of 2023. They are genderfluid and use they/them pronouns.

== See also ==
- Drag culture in New York City
- Drag Kids, 2019 documentary
- LGBT culture in New York City
- List of LGBT people from New York City
- NYC Drag March
- NYC Pride March
