= Bahar Mustafa race row =

In 2015 a racial controversy developed in the United Kingdom surrounding the activities of Bahar Mustafa, a representative for Goldsmiths Students' Union. The incident resulted in media and academic discussions regarding hate of boys and men, race relations and the impact of police investigations on free speech.

A Londoner of Turkish Cypriot ancestry, Mustafa worked as the welfare and diversity officer of Goldsmiths Students' Union and was a self-described feminist and anti-racist activist. In early 2015 she organised several events at Goldsmiths, University of London in which white students, and in another case both white and male students, were banned. This attracted national attention, with commentators criticising this as racial segregation and accusing Mustafa of racism and sexism, which Mustafa denied. Further controversy surrounded her posting to Twitter "KillAllWhiteMen" and for referring to a fellow student as "white trash". She also put her hand to a poster on the door of her office with the slogan "kill all white men" with a picture of a man with tears rolling down his face. A petition was launched calling for Mustafa to be sacked; a vote of no confidence initiated by Goldsmiths' students failed to gain sufficient support to remove her from the position. The Metropolitan Police launched an investigation into Mustafa's comments; they initially charged her on two counts, but dropped proceedings after concluding that they were unlikely to secure a conviction. This police investigation attracted media attention, with commentators from across the political spectrum describing it as an affront to free speech. Amid an investigation into allegations of bullying, in November 2015 Mustafa resigned from her position at Goldsmiths.

== Controversy ==
=== Initial incident and response ===
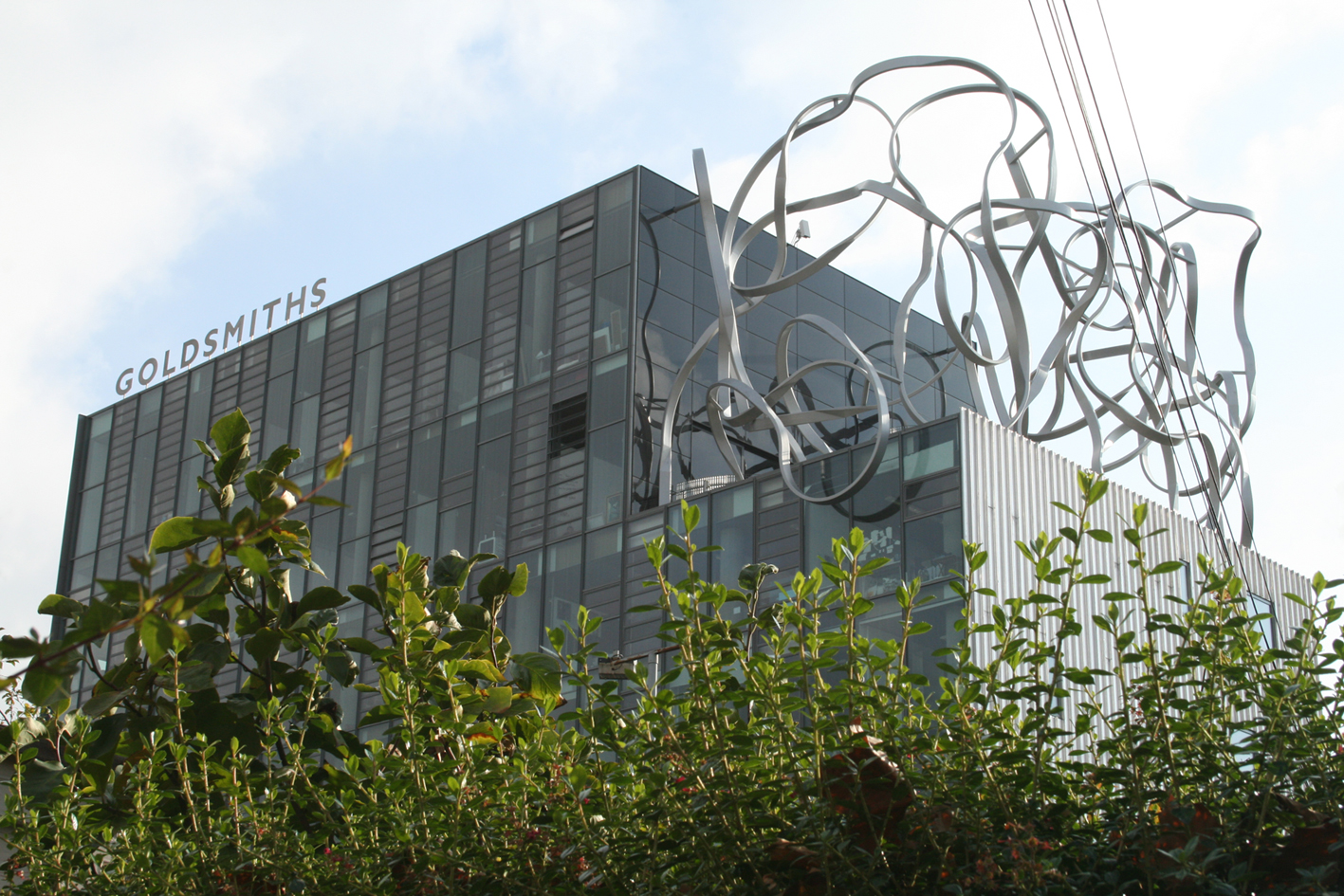
The incident surrounded the student union at Goldsmiths College. Pictured: Ben Pimlott Studio Building.

A 28-year-old from Edmonton in northeast London, Mustafa was the welfare and diversity officer of Goldsmiths Students' Union. She described herself as a "working class, Turkish Cypriot, queer, disabled woman and activist" whose political views were "intersectional, queer, feminist, [and] anti-racist". In February 2015 she was criticised by The Spectator after organising a Goldsmiths Students' Union social event and screening of Dear White People for black and minority ethnic (BME) students only, with white people being banned from attending. The Spectator stated that this event represented "racial segregation at a British university" and highlighted the double standards of holding an event from which white people were banned when a white-only event would certainly be prohibited.

In April 2015, Mustafa again attracted attention while planning an event devoted to challenging the "white-centric culture" of student occupations and diversifying the student curriculum because—on the event's Facebook page—she asked that only women of color attend the event. In her original post she stated:

"Hey, I made as many of you hosts so please invite loads of BME [black and minority ethnic] Women and non-binary people!! Also, if you've been invited and you're a man and/or white PLEASE DON'T COME just cos I invited a bunch of people and hope you will be responsible enough to respect this is a BME Women and non-binary event only. Don't worry lads we will give you and allies things to do."

The feminist scholar of creative writing Prudence Chamberlain later noted that such a situation was "not at all uncommon in the organisation of diversity events". Mustafa herself later described her events as being "not unlike women and black caucuses that have been a proud tradition of the trade union movement for decades".

Mustafa's comments attracted national media attention, and generated anger from both student publications and the wider press. Many accused her of sexism, as well as racism. Speaking anonymously, the president of one student union criticised Mustafa, stating that she was contributing to a campus environment in which white, cisgender males were given the impression that "they can't say anything for fear of retribution", resulting in life becoming "very difficult" for them. The anonymous president added that it was "laughable" and ironic that Mustafa thought that her events are "diversifying the student community in the name of feminism and multiculturalism". The Spectator similarly saw irony in Mustafa's comments, stating that "it is astonishing" that a racially exclusionary event "is deemed acceptable. It wouldn't be tolerated anywhere else in Britain – so why on earth is it being tolerated at a British university?" The Tab expressed the view that there was "a huge difference" between holding events that catered primarily to women and ethnic minority students and events which banned anyone who was not a woman or ethnic minority from attending.

=== Response and further controversy ===
Mustafa deleted the Facebook post, and responded to her critics in a video uploaded to Eastlondonlines.co.uk, in which she dismissed criticism of her actions as "an outrageous distortion of fact". Here, she stated that:

"There have been charges made against me that I am racist and sexist to white men. I want to explain why this is false. I, an ethnic minority woman, cannot be racist or sexist towards white men, because racism and sexism describes structures of privilege based on race and gender. And therefore women of colour and minority genders cannot be racist or sexist because we do not stand to benefit from such a system. In order for our actions to be deemed racist or sexist, the current system would have to be one that enables only people of colour and women to benefit economically and socially on such a large scale and to the systematic exclusion of white people and men, who for the past 400 years would have to have been subjected to block colonisation. We do not live in such a system, we do not know of such a history, reverse racism and reverse sexism are not real."

Mustafa's justification of her actions caused more public controversy. The BBC found commentators who supported Mustafa's definition of racism as a form of structural inequality, whereas others disagreed with her, believing that anyone could be racist to those of another race and that this was a case of double standards. Further controversy surrounded her alleged posting to Twitter "KillAllWhiteMen", which was described as racist. In another tweet, made from her official Twitter account as a student union representative, she accused student activist Tom Harris of being "white trash". She later apologized, acknowledging that her use of the official account was "not professional". She told Vice that she had never tweeted "#KillAllWhiteMen", but defended those who did, saying that it "is something that a lot of people in the feminist community use to express frustration" and that it is not a literal command for androcide. She also stated that she had received rape and death threats following the media coverage.

A petition was established on Change.org that called for Mustafa to be removed from her position at the union for "hate speech"; as of 23 May it had gained 18,000 signatures. Within Goldsmiths itself, a group of students petitioned for a vote of no confidence in Mustafa, but by May their petition had gained only 165 signatures, representing 1.8% of the union's membership; according to the union's regulations, 3% of members' signatures were required in order to trigger a referendum regarding Mustafa's continued employment and thus she remained in her position. Writing in The Independent, Max Benwell stated that the hashtag #KillAllWhiteMen was "obviously tongue-in-cheek" before adding that "no-one actually thinks that she was actually calling for a male genocide, do they?".

=== Police investigation ===
In May 2015, the Metropolitan Police revealed that they were investigating Mustafa's tweets. In October, they charged Mustafa with two offences, sending a threatening message and sending a menacing or offensive message via a public network. She was ordered to appear at Bromley Magistrates Court on 5 November. However, on 26 October the Metropolitan Police dropped the charges, revealing that they had discontinued their criminal case against Mustafa because it had been disclosed that Mustafa had decided to resign her position at the university in view of her well publicised actions. . Under the Victim's Right to Review Scheme, one of the complainants in the case then requested that the Crown Prosecution Service review their decision to terminate criminal proceedings.

Robert Sharp, a representative of the freedom of speech advocacy group English PEN, expressed the view that the police had been excessive in their dealings with Mustafa, stating his view that the fact that the case had "gone on so long is a chill on free speech". Sharp believed that advancing criminal proceedings was not in the interests of the public because Mustafa's comments were "clearly a joke... It was a political statement, however inadvisable it was for an elected students' union official to post it." Sharp's analysis was later quoted by the academic David Harvey in his discussion of how social media technologies were influencing law-making. Praising the police's decision to terminate the charges in The Guardian, Charlie Brinkhurst-Cuff believed that there had been a double standard in the fact that police had investigated Mustafa for her comments. Brinkhurst-Cuff nevertheless stated that "there's no denying that Mustafa has made some mistakes", in particular by adopting approaches "that many would consider extreme." A commentator for The Tab concurred, commenting that although Mustafa might be "a bore and a killjoy", that "doesn't make [her] a criminal".

Among those to publicly express support for Mustafa's position using Twitter were right-wing commentators Katie Hopkins and Milo Yiannopoulos. Mustafa stated that she was "so embarrassed" to receive Hopkins' support, regarding her as "an attention-seeking, classist idiot". She added that both Hopkins and Yiannopoulos were "not my allies—I did not ask for their support, and I don't want it."

== Aftermath ==
In November 2015, Adrihani Rashid, the President of Goldsmith Students' Union, resigned from her position amid allegations that she had been bullied by Mustafa. Mustafa and the union's campaigns and activities officer were said to have created a "hostile" working environment for Rashid, undermining her and "badmouth[ing]" her to other students, as well as accusing her of acting "undemocratically" when Rashid refused to endorse solidarity statements backing student protesters and occupiers. Goldsmiths called for a full investigation into the allegations, with the union agreeing to do so. In a statement, the union stated that it "takes these allegations very seriously, and having raised these with the Trustee Board, will be instigating an independent inquiry".

Amid these allegations, on 20 November Mustafa publicly stated that she was resigning from her job with the student union. She informed reporters from The Evening Standard that "I am resigning for the preservation of my mental and physical health. I am still committed to the independent investigation which I am confident will shed light on the structural issues that have led to the mental and physical breakdown of all sabbatical officers".

In March 2018, Mustafa—now describing herself as "a communist, anti-fascist, and feminist organiser"—spoke out on the Munroe Bergdorf race row incident. She criticised the decision of the Labour Party to dismiss Bergdorf from her role and drew comparisons between the way she and Bergdorf had been treated by both the right-wing media and sectors of the political left.

== See also ==
- Munroe Bergdorf race row incident
