= Gypsy Sport =

Fashion brand

- Company type: Private
- Industry: Fashion
- Founded: 2012
- Founder: Rio Uribe
- Headquarters: New York City, United States
- Key people: Rio Uribe (Creative Director)
- Products: Apparel, accessories

Gypsy Sport is an American fashion brand. The company is based in New York City and was founded in 2012 by its creative director Rio Uribe.

== History ==
Uribe grew up in Koreatown, Los Angeles. After working for Balenciaga, rising to head of merchandising, he founded Gypsy Sport in 2012.

The company's models include Shamir Bailey, Maya Mones, Munroe Bergdorf, Emila Ortiz, Desmond Napoles, Tommy Playboy, and Lourdes Leon. Fans of the brand include Jaden Smith, A$AP Ferg and John Cale. All of their products are made in the US: New York City, Philadelphia, and Los Angeles.

In June 2020, in honor of the 50th anniversary of the first LGBTQ pride parade, Queerty named Uribe among the fifty heroes “leading the nation toward equality, acceptance, and dignity for all people”.
