= Baby, We're Ascending =

Studio album by HAAi
- Released: May 27, 2022
- Studio: Mute
- Genres: Electronic, techno
- Length: 1:01:06
- Label: Mute Records

HAAi chronology
Systems Up, Windows Down (2019)	Baby, We're Ascending (2022)	Humanise (2025)

Singles from Baby, We're Ascending
- 1. "Bodies of Water" Released: 24 February 2022; 2. "Purple Jelly Disc" Released: 31 March 2022; 3. "Baby, We're Ascending" Released: 27 May 2022

Baby, We're Ascending is the debut studio album from the Australian electronic music producer HAAi. The album was released on 27 May 2022.

== Background and release ==
Baby, We're Ascending was announced on 23 February 2022 for release on 27 May. The announcement was accompanied by the lead single, "Bodies of Water". The second single, "Purple Jelly Disc" was released on 31 March, and the final single, the title track, was released on 5 May.

== Critical reception ==
In his review, The Guardian writer Shaad D'Souza praised the album for finding a "balance" between its different genres but criticised the "slightly untethered" nature of its more "pumping" portions. Pitchfork reviewer Philip Sherburne stated it "unrolls like a unified suite" with the "interstitials... often as gripping as the anthems".

The Australian radio station Double J placed it at 20 on their top 50 best albums of 2022 list, with writer Phoebe Bennett praising the album's "transcending and euphoric soundscapes".

== Track listing ==
Baby, We're Ascending track listing
No.	Title	Length
1.	"Channels"	2:56
2.	"Pigeon Barron"	6:39
3.	"Bodies of Water"	5:04
4.	"Human Sound" (featuring Kai-Isaiah Jamal)	5:26
5.	"Louder Always Better"	1:41
6.	"Bigger Mood Ever" (featuring Alexis Taylor)	4:46
7.	"AM"	0:58
8.	"FM"	5:04
9.	"I've Been Thinking A Lot Lately"	3:49
10.	"Purple Jelly Disc" (featuring Obi Franky)	6:12
11.	"Baby, We're Ascending" (featuring Jon Hopkins)	6:27
12.	"Orca"	8:06
13.	"Tardigrade"	3:54
Total length:		60:34
