= Drag Queens of London =

British reality television series

- Genre: Reality
- Theme music composer: Stef Caers
- Opening theme: "Come for Me"
- Country of origin: United Kingdom
- Original language: English
- No. of seasons: 1
- No. of episodes: 10

Production
- Executive producers: Becky Maynard; Jason Mitchell
- Running time: 44 minutes
- Production company: The Connected Set

Original release
- Network: London Live
- Release: 22 April – 24 June 2014

Drag Queens of London is a British LGBT-related reality television series, commissioned by London Live network.

The series follows a selection of drag queens over a three-month period in London to get an inside look at their daily lives, both on and off stage. In April 2014, London Live announced a documentary to feature colourful characters from Soho's drag scene as one of the major highlights for this new channel's initial offerings. The series premiered in the United Kingdom on 22 April 2014.

== Cast ==
- Silver Summers (Bobby Houston): Silver is single, fun-loving and a voice to be reckoned with. She is showing no signs of slowing down and enjoys nights of partying hard whilst focussing on performing. She is a member of The Buffalo Girls group, as well as drag troupe The Supreme Fabulettes, and is a successful solo artist. Silver is the only drag queen to be featured in every episode.
- Lady Lloyd (Lloyd Dixon): Lloyd's famously loud personality and brush with fame has earned her celebrity status as a loveable loose cannon within the drag world. She rocketed ahead in the world of drag when Vivienne Westwood chose her as a catwalk model. As well as being a DJ and a host at Soho's club night, "Trannyshack", she is also known for being a third of London's first drag pop band, The Buffalo Girls.
- Baga Chipz (Leo Lauren): Baga believes personality is everything, and idolises and bases her drag act on strong working-class women featured in the 60s and 70s 'golden age' of Coronation Street. She is a member of the Buffalo Girls drag troupe with Lady Lloyd and Silver Summers. (Chipz later competed on the first series of RuPaul's Drag Race UK, placing third.)
- Miss Dusty O (David Hodge): With over three decades of experience on the drag scene, Dusty O is the voice of reason, and an idol to most young queens. Dusty O is the host and co-promoter of Trannyshack and one of the biggest drag competitions of the year, Trannyshack Academy. She is invited to the prestigious London College of Fashion as a muse to students who make her outfits as part of their course.
- Rosie Beaver (Chris Clegg): Rugby player by day and flamboyant drag queen by night, Rosie breaks all stereotypes by living an unlikely juxtaposition. Always questing for love, Chris finds it hard to tell boys that he's a drag queen. In the series he becomes a mentor to his best friend and fellow rugby player Nick, who decides to explore performing in drag himself.
- Violet Sparks (Nick Burdall): Rosie's best friend and fellow rugby player, and blossoming drag queen. Nick follows in the steps of friend Chris and enters an amateur drag competition. Nick also tries to find love in and out of drag, as well as finding his feet in the drag world. Nick works in an office during the day but uses drag to make his evenings less routine.
- Vanity Von Glow (Thom Glow): After 5 years of success performing as Vanity, Thom is a frustrated queen looking to reignite the excitement she once felt for her act. Out of drag, Thom is now looking to reinvent his act as a boy around LGBT venues, as well as continuing to perform as Vanity on the side.
- Vicki Vivacious (Aaron Johns): A Supreme Fabulette whose theatre aspirations led her to be a part of the top drag troupe, with ideas of a one-woman show and TV stardom, Vicki's got a fame-hungry attitude. Vicki took a six-month break from drag to rejuvenate and reinvent her act. She starred in Priscilla Queen of the Desert in London's prestigious West End theatre. (She later competed on the fifth series of RuPaul's Drag Race UK, placing seventh.)
- Meth (Ben Giddens): Having studied at the prestigious Central School of Speech and Drama, Meth has a professional, alternative show and a sharp wit that has given her a strong cult following. She is the doyenne of Meth Lab, and is now stepping it up another level to bring a string of new club nights to the city. The arrival of DWV to Meth Lab features in the series. He is a member of Familyyy Fierce, a collective of seven drag queens and performers. On April 29, 2020, she announced she was changing her name to Me on Instagram.
- Bourgeoisie: Bourgeoisie is a no-holds-barred Yank with a flair for designing and making ever-more outrageous outfits that ensure she's always being talked about. She is a member of Familyyy Fierce.
- Munroe Bergdorf: Transitioning transsexual and aspiring businesswoman, Munroe is the 'It girl' of the drag scene. Her high-end lifestyle and big dreams ensure she's always in the spotlight.

=== Recurring cast ===
- Jodie Harsh: UK drag queen and DJ.
- Walt: Dusty O's co-host and co-promoter of Trannyshack.
- Ruby Wednesday: Baby of the Familyyy Fierce, Ruby Wednesday is ready to prove she's all grown up with her ambitious, androgynous and occasionally alarming act.
- Rubyyy Jones: Familyyy Fierce matriarch, Rubyyy Jones is truly fierce and fabulous, the "UK's Queen of Queerlesque" and also works in theatre as a director and choreographer.
- Miss Cairo: Familyyy Fierce member, Miss Cairo is famously seductive, but far from being just a pretty face, she is keen to use drag to explore important issues.
- Lilly SnatchDragon: Member of The Familyyy Fierce, stage manager for The Meth Lab.
- Jonny Woo: East London drag performer. Johnny also stars in the Colin Rothbart 'frockumentary' Dressed As A Girl.

== Episodes ==
No.	Title	Original release date
1	"Episode One"	22 April 2014
Silver Summers and Lady Lloyd set out to re-launch girl pop band Buffalo Girls. Their professional commitment is thwarted only by the band's third member, Baga Chipz, who feels there is no point rehearsing for their big comeback show at Madame Jojo's, when she'd rather be out on the town. Meanwhile, Silver is also moonlighting in a second, more polished sixties-influenced drag act, The Supreme Fabulettes.
2	"Episode Two"	29 April 2014
Silver Summers returns home to Glasgow to perform in front of her family for the first time. Other stage acts question their future on the scene. Meth plays host to DWV, an American group that rose to fame on Ru Paul's Drag Race, and faces difficulties in their sell-out show at Camden's Black Cap along with The Familyyy Fierce.
3	"Episode Three"	6 May 2014
The UK’s top drag competition Tranny Shack Academy kicks off and new drag queens from around the country flock to Soho to audition for a coveted spot. Rosie Beaver's protegee Violet Sparks and other would-be stage acts face the judging of Dusty O and Walt to be chosen for Tranny Shack Academy. Elsewhere, Vanity Von Glow questions her career as she forges a second alias as a boy.
4	"Episode Four"	13 May 2014
Darling of the drag scene and transitioning transsexual Munroe Bergdorf embarks on her journey to raise the money for life-changing facial surgery in her quest to become more feminine. She is devastated to discover her best friend from childhood and drag-girl-about-town Lady Lloyd has slept with her ex-boyfriend. As Munroe confronts Lady Lloyd their entire friendship is brought into question. Contemplating their friendship Lady Lloyd returns to her childhood home in Cambridgeshire to get perspective on things, while Munroe returns to her old University haunts in Brighton. Meanwhile political drag queens Jonny Woo and Glyn Famous embark on a protest against Russia’s anti-gay propaganda laws, and invite Meth to perform at their East London fundraiser, while Rosie Beaver continues her quest for love.
5	"Episode Five"	20 May 2014
After the breakdown of her friendship with Munroe, Lady Lloyd puts the row behind her and sets out to boost the profile of her drag girl group the Buffalo Girls by looking for a new manager and writing what she hopes will be a hit single for the band. Meanwhile Rosie Beaver takes radical action to get her love life back on track, heading on the pull in drag with best friend Nick, aka Violet Sparks. American drag queen Bourgeoisie’s confidence is shaken as she comes in the bottom two in the Tranny Shack Academy drag competition, but she doesn’t take it lying down as she confronts club promoters Dusty O and Walt.
6	"Episode Six"	27 May 2014
The Buffalo Girls – Lady Lloyd, Baga Chipz and Silver Summers - continue their quest for pop stardom but a disagreement with their new manager scuppers their plans. Silver also has to deal with competing commitments as a member of family-friendly drag troupe The Supreme Fabulettes prepare for a nationwide theatre tour after a hiatus. Silver and her ‘frenemie’ and co-performer Vicki Vivacious decide to confront their long-running issues with each other. Meanwhile Rosie Beaver decides to date within the drag community as she steps out with fellow drag queen and Tranny Shack Academy contestant, Snow White Trash.
7	"Episode Seven"	3 June 2014
Drag Queens of London goes global as drag troupe The Supreme Fabulettes head to European Gay Ski Week in France to perform to an expectant crowd of fans. The real drama unfolds away from the slopes as Silver loses her voice before an important performance. With her bandmates and tour manager blaming Silver for partying too hard, friendships becoming strained within the group. Meanwhile drag queen Rosie Beaver and Nick's (akabut Violet Sparks) friendship is put under strain as they fight over the same man.
8	"Episode Eight"	10 June 2014
The country’s most fierce drag competition, Tranny Shack Academy, comes to a climax as one aspiring drag queen wins the coveted title in a tense finale at Madame JoJo’s in Soho. As one career is born, the stage doors close on The Drag Queens of London, as we see The Buffalo Girls and Vicki Vivacious pull off high-profile gigs and a debut professional performance by Rosie Beaver’s best friend Nick as Violet Sparks.
9	"Best of One"	17 June 2014
This special episode profiles the characters from the program, digs deeper into the backgrounds of each queen, hears their aspirations, and revisits memorable moments from throughout the series. Part One includes Baga Chipz, Dusty O, Rosie Beaver, Meth, and Silver Summers.
10	"Best of Two"	17 June 2014
This special episode profiles the characters from the program, digs deeper into the backgrounds of each queen, hears their aspirations, and revisits memorable moments from throughout the series. Part Two includes Lady Lloyd, Munroe Bergdorf, Vicki Vivacious, Violet Sparks, and Bourgeoisie.

== Home release ==
Season	Release date	Episodes	Run time	Discs	Distributor
1	27 October 2014	10	363 minutes	2	Revelation Films

== International broadcast ==
The show is currently being broadcast in Australia, Belgium, Canada, the Netherlands, Poland, Finland and Sweden.
