= Zephryn Taitte =

British actor

Zephryn Taittle
- Born: England
- Occupation: Actor
- Years active: 2008 - present

Zephryn Taitte is a British actor of Guyanese descent. He is known for his role as Cyril Robinson in the television series, Call the Midwife.

== Background ==
Zephryn Taitte, the youngest of three children was born in South London. His father was a carpenter and mason.

Taitte did not go to drama school, but he did get a performing arts qualification (BTEC), a combination of performance with arts business which is very useful for work in the industry. He got a job close to where the family lived, which was at the Ovalhouse Theatre. On his mother's suggestion he tried out for an audition and was cast in a modern adaptation as Romeo. Since the 1960s, the Ovalhouse Theater was a center for political activism. With the role as Romeo being a changing point in his life, he was chosen as a potential young leader in the arts to go on a British Council-sponsored trip to South Africa. When he returned he was fuelled with enthusiasm and began working with the Pan Intercultural Arts which is a small charity based in London.

== Career ==
Taitte played the role of Akeem in the film Flashmob that was directed by Ash Mahmmod and Naeem Mahmood, and released in 2009.

Taitte appeared as Reginald Thomas in an episode of The Hour. Then starting in 2012, he appeared in Brothers With No Game which continued until 2018.

In 2019, Taitte started his role as Cyril Robinson, a pastor in Call the Midwife. At the time, the series was in Season 8.

It was reported by BBC in 2022 that Taitte became a patron of the 4YP charity. The charity which is based in Ipswich uses drama to keep young people away from crime.

In an episode of Call the Midwife, aired on 9 February 2025, Cyril's cat Nigel, a well-loved cast member by fans became sick as a result of overflowing rubbish resulting from a bin man strike. Pastor Cyril held the cat through the night, promising to take him to the vet in the morning. Nigel was dead when he awoke. Some fans were devastated by the loss and even called for a boycott of the show.

Taitte and Adwoa Akoto acted in the short film, Claudia which was directed by Benjamin Kuffuor in 2023. In the film he plays a man who struggles with the loss of his lover due to their relationship ending. He goes to great lengths to try and get her back. The film was shown at the Toronto Black Film Festival on 15 February 2025.

== Filmography ==
Television shows
Title	Episode	Role	Director	Date aired	Notes
The Hour	Failure at Launch	Reginald Thomas	Coky Giedroyc	24 August 2011	
Urban Myths	"Cary Grant and Timothy Leary"	Anthony	Geoffrey Sax	9 February 2017	
Brothers With No Game	17 episodes	Leon Mayne	Dorian	2012 - 2018	
Doctors	"Playtime"	Scott Sullivan	Vito Bruno	15 January 2018	
Father Brown	"The New Order"	Feather Featherstone	Jo Hallows	10 January 2022	
Unforgotten	"Episode #5.1"	Scott	Andy Wilson	3 September 2023	
Call the Midwife	56 episodes	Cyril Robinson	various	2019–present	

Films
Film	Role	Director	Year	Notes
Flashmob	Akeem	Ash Mahmood, Naeem Mahmood	2008	
Dirtymoney	Michael da Costa	Adam Tysoe	2013	
Get Stuffed	Tom	Colin O'Toole	2015	short
Run It Off	Ajamu	Liam O'Hara	2017	short
White	Black man	David Moya	2017	short
No Shade	Rory	Clare Anyiam-Osigwe	2018	
Daemon Mind	Alex	Jason Fite	2024	
Claudia	Joseph	Benjamin Kuffuor	2024	short
