= Not a Phase =

British charity

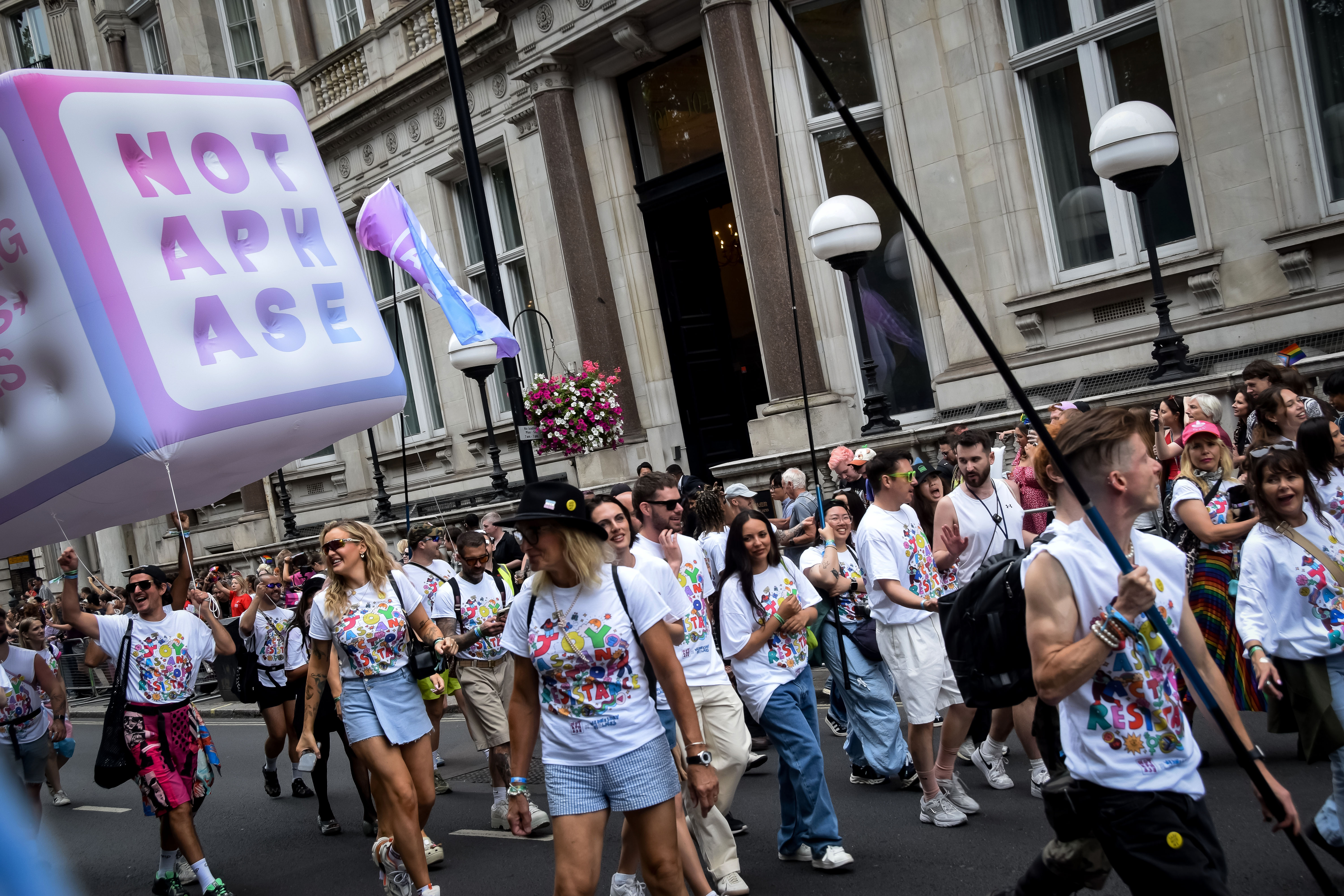
- Not a Phase at Pride in London 2025
- Formation: 2020; 6 years ago
- Legal status: Active
- Region served: United Kingdom
- Founders: Danielle St James; Jacqui Devon
- Website: notaphase.org

Not a Phase is a British charity organisation founded in 2020 by Danielle St James and Jacqui Devon. The nationwide charity aims to support and "uplift" the lives of trans and gender-diverse adults and promote education about the community.

== History ==
During the COVID-19 lockdown, Danielle St James and Jacqui Devon founded Not a Phase. The concept started when with the pair selling charitable merchandise designed by Devon sporting the titular phrase, with proceeds going to Mermaids. The initiative received support from Victoria Beckham and formed a partnership with Missguided. From there, Not a Phase developed into a "fully established charity" in its own right, with St James describing the project as constantly evolving to meet the current needs of the community.

By 2023, Not a Phase had opened eight locations around the UK, providing a variety of services and "peer support, guidance and resources" to trans and gender-diverse adults. In 2021, Not a Phase launched the fitness programme Misfits created by trustee Alix Maddison Anson-Jones.

In 2023, Not a Phase collaborated with fashion designers Fiorucci, Christopher Kane, Gareth Pugh, and Daniel W. Fletcher on six t-shirts to raffle. Max Balegde hosted a Not a Phase fundraiser event at the Clapham Grand in November featuring the likes of Caity Baser, Claudia Kariuki, Bailey J Mills and Anthony Lexa. Not a Phase were awarded a Pride in London Unity Fund. In 2024, the charity became a beneficiary of the Mighty Hoopla's Pink Noise foundation.

Amid the re-election of Donald Trump in the U.S. in 2024, American sponsors began pulling back from supporting charities like Not a Phase. The organisation set up a funding appeal on 11 April 2025, shortly after forming a partnership with Sephora UK. In response the UK Supreme Court ruling on the definition of woman in the Equality Act just a few days later, Not a Phase received a significant boost in funds and visibility, with actress Nicola Coughlan sharing a fundraiser for the organisation on her Instagram page. Singer Jake Shears announced his band Scissor Sisters would partner with Not a Phase for their upcoming tour.

Ahead of London Trans+ Pride 2025, Ian McKellen is hosting a reading of Twelfth Night featuring an all trans and non-binary ensemble, the proceeds of which will go to Not a Phase.

== See also ==
- Maxine Heron - model and comms officer for Not a Phase.
