= Humanise =

Studio album by HAAi
- Released: 10 October 2025
- Genre: Techno-pop
- Label: Mute

HAAi chronology
Baby, We're Ascending (2022)	Humanise (2025)

Singles from Humanise
- 1. "Can't Stand to Lose" Released: 11 February 2025; 2. "Shapeshift" Released: 11 April 2025; 3. "Satellite" Released: 28 May 2025; 4. "Hey!" Released: 22 July 2025; 5. "Stitches" Released: 10 September 2025

Humanise (stylised as HUMANiSE) is the second studio album by Australian electronic music producer Teneil Throssell, also known as HAAi. It was released on 10 October 2025 via Mute Records.

== Background and recording ==
Humanise includes collaborations with Jon Hopkins, Obi Franky, poet James Massiah, and the Trans Voices choir. Throssell said she intended the album to be for her "trans and queer family and our allies", describing the incorporation of queer creators in the album as "active resistance".

Thematically, the album was inspired by interaction between humanity and the increasing prevalence of technology. Its name came from an option on an audio plug-in that Throsell and Hopkins were working with, with them noting the ironic value of "something that is so not human" having the "option of whether you want to sound more human".

== Composition ==
DJ Magazine described the album as incorporating more vocal elements than HAAi's previous work and her output as a DJ; all of the tracks excluding one include vocals. She stated that this change came about as she felt she needed to "start writing more directly about my own experiences". Clash described the sound of "Can't Stand to Lose" as being influenced by both electronic music and other genres such as shoegaze.

== Promotion and release ==
The first singles of the album, "Can't Stand to Lose" and "Shapeshift" were released on 11 February and 11 April 2025 respectively. The album was announced on 28 May, alongside the first single "Satellite". This was followed by "Hey!" on 22 July and "Stitches" on 10 September.

The album was released on 10 October via Mute Records. Alongside the release, HAAi also released a filmed performance of the album in Drumsheds, set in a simulated retro office environment.

== Reception ==
In her review for DJ Magazine, Charlotte Krol described the album as being made up of "organic and synthetic sounds working in beautiful unison". Clash writer Josh Crowe described it as having an "intimate, almost confessional dimension".

== Tracklist ==
No.	Title	Length
1.	"Satellite (Intro)" (with Jon Hopkins, Obi Franky, ILĀ, Trans Voices)	2:14
2.	"Satellite" (with Jon Hopkins, Obi Franky, ILĀ, Trans Voices)	4:25
3.	"All That Falls Apart" (with James Massiah)	3:15
4.	"Comes Together"	3:03
5.	"Stitches"	4:23
6.	"Can't Stand to Lose"	4:53
7.	"Shapeshift" (with Kam-Bu)	4:50
8.	"Voices"	5:38
9.	"Go (Intro)" (with Kaiden Ford)	0:32
10.	"Go"	4:24
11.	"Humanise"	3:48
12.	"Hey! (Intro)"	0:25
13.	"Hey!"	3:46
14.	"Rushing (Intro)" (with ILĀ & Trans Voices)	0:28
15.	"Rushing" (with ILĀ & Trans Voices)	3:53
16.	"New Euphoria" (with ILĀ, Trans Voices, Alexis Taylor)	5:19
17.	"HQ" (with Kaiden Ford)	3:13
Total length:		58:29

Notes

- Track 11 is stylised as "HUMANiSE"
