= HAAi =

Australian music producer and DJ

- Born: Teneil Laetitia Throssell; Karratha, Western Australia
- Genre: Electronic
- Label: Mute

Teneil Laetitia Throssell, known professionally as HAAi, is an Australian electronic music producer and DJ from Karratha, Western Australia.

== Career ==
Throssell began her musical career in a series of rock bands, eventually moving to the UK as part of psychedelic rock duo Dark Bells. She began DJing only after the band split up, going on to hold a residency at club Phonox in London from late 2016 for two years. HAAi gained wider prominence after winning the BBC Radio 1's Essential Mix of the Year 2018.

She released her debut EP in November 2019 with Systems Up, Windows Down. This was followed-up by her debut album, Baby, We're Ascending, in May 2022. She has collaborated with various other electronic artists, including Fred Again and Jon Hopkins.

In 2025, she announced her next album, Humanise, which was released on October 10.

== Personal life ==
Throssell has ADHD. She has identified as queer.

== Discography ==
=== Albums ===
Title	Album details
Baby, We're Ascending	Released: 27 May 2022; Label: Mute Records
Humanise	Released: 10 October 2025; Label: Mute Records
Digitise	Released: 9 October 2026; Label: Mute Records

=== EPs ===
Title	Album details
Systems Up, Windows Down	Released: 14 November 2019; Label: Mute Records
