= Mya Mehmi =

British-Punjabi DJ

- Born: Bradford, England
- Occupations: DJ; vocalist; producer; podcast host
- Organization: Pxssy Palace

Mya Mehmi is a British-Punjabi DJ, vocalist, producer, and podcast host. She is a central member and co-producer of the Pxssy Palace LGBTQ club night.

== Early life ==
Mehmi was born in Bradford to Punjabi parents and grew up in Leicester. At age 17, Mehmi moved to London to pursue a music career.

== Career ==
After moving to London, Mehmi began her relationship with Pxssy Palace volunteering as a "badge bitch", and began producing Pxssy Palace parties a few years later.

In 2023 Mehmi released her first solo track, "Parivaar (Interlude)", which Gay Times called "bold", and "R&B-tinged". She had written the song in 2020 for her cousin and father following the death of her Thaya (uncle). It was featured on the BBC Asian Network music playlist, making Mehmi the first trans woman to be featured on the playlist. Mehmi stated that this was an honour, and expressed surprise that transgender people had not already been represented.

She released the self-produced single "Haldi" in May 2025, which references the use of turmeric at Punjabi weddings where it is rubbed into the skin of the bride and groom. Mehmi hosts Straight No Chaser, a podcast about navigating the world as a British-Punjabi trans woman. In October 2025, Mehmi was one of nine trans women to be featured on the Glamour UK Women of the Year cover.

== Artistry ==
Mehmi grew up listening to Ol' Dirty Bastard, Fugees and Dr. Dre in her household.

== Personal life ==
Mehmi is a transgender woman, and began transitioning in 2020.
