= Dressed as a Girl =

- Theatrical release poster
- Directed by: Colin Rothbart
- Screenplay by: Colin Rothbart
- Produced by: Colin Rothbart, Chris Amos
- Starring: Jonny Woo, Scottee, Amber, John Sizzle, Pia, Holestar
- Release date: 22 March 2015
- Running time: 94 minutes
- Country: United Kingdom
- Language: English

Dressed as a Girl is a documentary film of East London’s alternative drag scene, directed by Colin Rothbart, which focuses on both the public and personal lives of some of the key performers on the alternative drag scene.

According to the US/Canadian magazine Vice it has been called a "frockumentary" which, as well as looking at the public face of the drag scene, it tells the personal stories of six of its performers.

Although the film documents the highs and lows of their personal lives as well as their 'on-stage' personas, The Guardian notes that "Once the film-maker returns to his subjects off-hours, however, he identifies as much subtle and cherishable variation as there is among birds of paradise."

== Cast ==
The film examines the careers and off-stage lives of six London drag queens: Jonny Woo, Scottee, Holestar, Pia, Amber, and John Sizzle

== Crew ==
Colin Rothbart ... Director | Colin Rothbart ... Producer | Christopher Amos ... Producer

== Production ==
Inspired by Paris Is Burning, Colin Rothbart initially recorded footage of the stars of the documentary performing at the NYC Downlow stage, Glastonbury.

== Music ==
Original music for the film was provided by Amber Swallowz, Paul Warkworth, Feral Five, The Beef, Black Gold Buffalo, The Dash, Feral Is Kinky, Fil OK, Holestar, Hannah Holland, Jojo De Freq, K-Tron/Sma5H TV (K-Tron, Steve Baker(Steve Sma5h), Rob Burnham, Mama, Per QX, Mama Shamone, Phil Spalding, Nigel Stewart, Jim Warboy, Jon Pleased Wimmin and Jonny Woo
