= London Live (TV channel) =

Local television channel in London, United Kingdom

- Country: United Kingdom
- Broadcast area: London (region)
- Headquarters: Alphabeta, 14–18 Finsbury Square, London

Programming
- Language: English

Ownership
- Owner: ESTV (Lebedev Holdings Limited)
- Key people: Tim Kirkman CEO

History
- Launched: 31 March 2014
- Closed: 19 January 2025 (10 years, 9 months and 19 days)
- Replaced by: London TV

Links
- Website: www.londonlive.co.uk

Availability

Terrestrial
- Freeview: Channel 8

Streaming media
- London Live: www.londonlive.co.uk/tv/

London Live
- London; United Kingdom
- Channels: Digital: 8 (Freeview)

Programming
- Affiliations: Local TV

Ownership
- Owner: ESTV; (Lebedev Holdings Limited)

History
- First air date: 31 March 2014
- Last air date: 19 January 2025 (10 years, 9 months and 19 days)

Technical information
- Licensing authority: Ofcom

London Live was a local television channel in London, England, which aired local news, current affairs, sports, arts, events, and entertainment. The channel launched in 2014 to serve the London area under the legislation for local television, and broadcast on Freeview and Sky.

The channel was owned by Russian oligarch Evgeny Lebedev, who was also the chairman and owner of both Evening Standard Ltd (publisher of the Evening Standard newspaper) and Independent Print Ltd (publisher of The Independent). In January 2025, the channel was bought by David Montgomery's Local TV Limited, leading to London Live's closure on 19 January 2025. It was replaced by Local TV's London TV.

== History ==
The London licence was awarded to ESTV Limited by Ofcom, the UK's media regulator, in 2013 after bids were invited for a number of areas in 2012. ESTV is owned by Lebedev Holdings, whose majority shareholder is Evgeny Lebedev and whose other subsidiaries include Evening Standard Limited. London Live launched at 18:30 on 31 March 2014.

The channel broadcast on Freeview using the CoMux-operated London local DTT multiplex (mux), transmitted on UHF channel 29 from the Crystal Palace transmitting station, and was also available via Sky satellite and cable TV to viewers with London postcodes. On 21 March 2018, the London DTT mux was moved to UHF channel 35 as part of 700 MHz clearance plans. Crystal Palace also operates on a single frequency network with Croydon, which improves reception in South and East London. London Live ultimately occupied the unadvertised local mux available on UHF channel 34 from the Hemel Hempstead relay as of 27 March 2019, which extended its coverage outside the M25 to the Hemel Hempstead and St. Albans areas.

London Live was broadcast from studios at Alphabeta House in Finsbury Square, which is also the headquarters of The Independent and Evening Standard newspapers, both owned by Lebedev Holdings.

Before its launch, the channel was expected to spend between £15m and £18m before breaking even in about three years; revenue was predicted to reach £25m by then. For the year to September 2021, ESTV Limited reported an operating profit of £4.1 million on turnover of £7.4 million.

== Closure ==
Until January 2025, the owner of London Live was Evgeny Lebedev, chairman and owner of the London Standard, formerly London Evening Standard. In January 2025, the channel was bought by Local TV Ltd.

On 13 January 2025, the channel announced via their social media feeds that "The TV channel will no longer be on air from [23:59 on 19 January]".

== Programmes ==
=== Original programmes ===
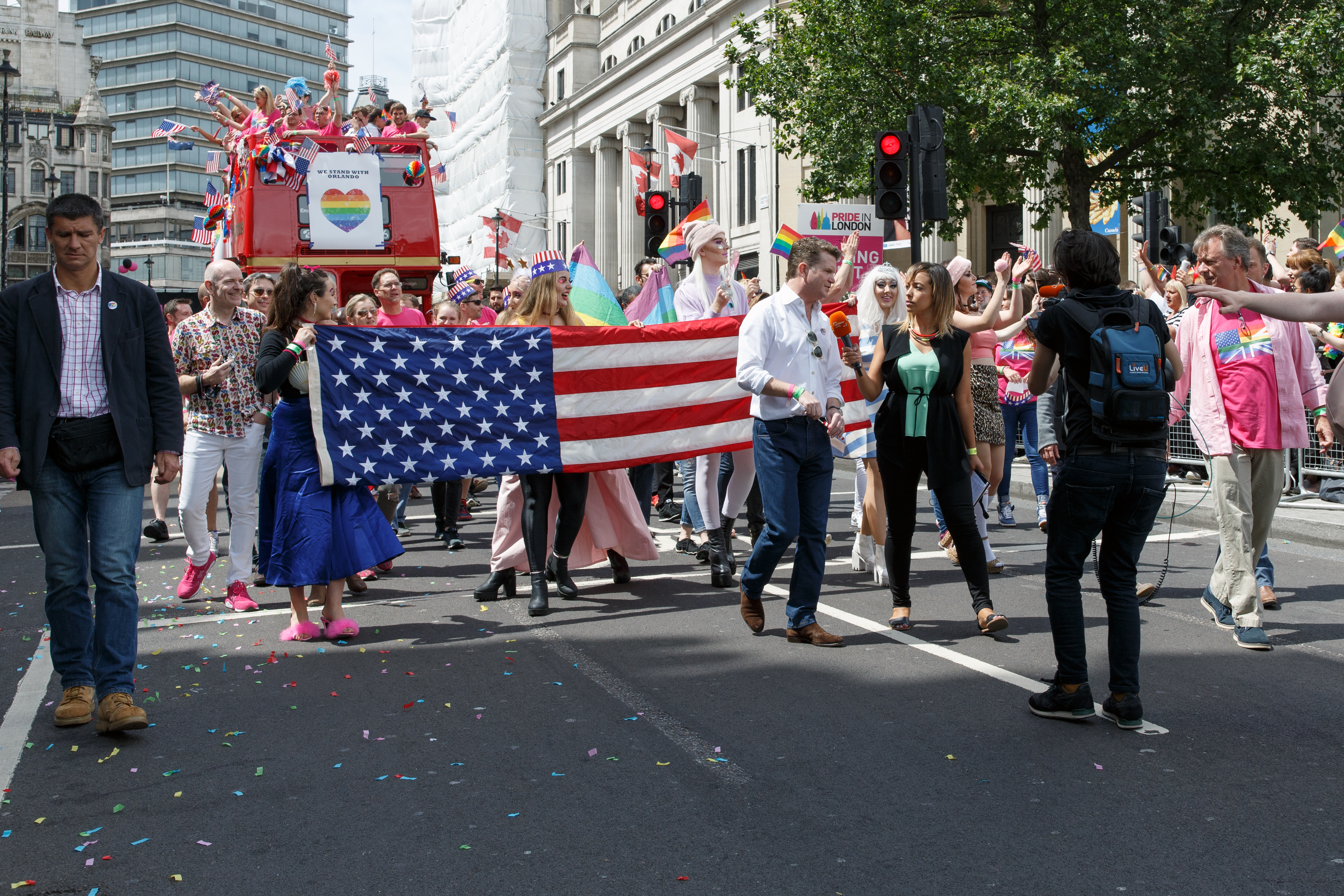
A London Live reporter interviewing Matthew Barzun during the parade at Pride in London 2016

London Live has commissioned a varied portfolio of programmes, including Drag Queens of London, Good Morning Breakfast, CTRL Freaks, Can You Cook It, Food Junkies, Fresh Fantasy, Jeff Leach +1, Place Invaders, F2 Kicks Off and Nihal's City Swagger. It has also commissioned documentaries including Girl on Girl, Jail Birds, Half Man Standing, Teenage Kicks, Sizzle London, The Young Upstarts, Digital Nation, Roger & Robin's Night Club Tips, Ron & Ron, Fight Club London, No Place Like Home, Antisocial Network, and Beggar Off.

In September 2013 the channel announced its first acquired series: a family sitcom, All About the McKenzies. The show, previously only available via YouTube, is written and produced by Samuell Benta.

In November 2013, London Live announced its first prime-time commission: F2 Kicks Off from UK indie Renowned Films, hosted by the F2Freestylers duo Billy Wingrove and Jeremy Lynch.

In January 2014 the channel announced acquired the web show Brothers With No Game. In March 2014, Drag Queens of London was announced.

=== Other programmes ===
London Live also broadcasts a range of comedy, drama, documentaries and entertainment programmes such as London Real, Absolute Power, Green Wing, Peep Show, Smack the Pony, Spaced, Trigger Happy TV, Twenty Twelve, Filthy Rich and Homeless, Soho Blues, The Tube, Snog Marry Avoid?, Vice Squad, Hale and Pace, Born Equal, Freefall, Harley Street, London's Burning, Misfits, Moses Jones, The Shadow Line, White Teeth, 10 Years Younger, and Cash in the Attic. By 2021, the channel was showing a range of classic shows (similar to programmes already repeated on Talking Pictures TV, ITV4 or Forces TV) alongside films and local programmes with titles including Sapphire and Steel, Danger Man, The Sandbaggers, and Goodnight Sweetheart in the schedules.

In July 2017, it was announced the channel would have an early morning line-up of children's programming from the libraries of Saban Brands and Studio 100 (such as Mighty Morphin Power Rangers (1993–96, 2010 "Disney era" version) and Digimon. After the contract expired, the channel began airing programming from 41 Entertainment, mainly content from the BKN International library. As of 2023, the channel does not broadcast any children's programmes.

=== Former on-air team ===
- Anthony Baxter (presenter/head of news)
- Alex Beard (presenter)
- Alison Earle (presenter/reporter)
- Marc Edwards (presenter/reporter)
- Louise Scodie (presenter/reporter)
- Claudia Liza Vanderpuije (née Armah) (presenter/reporter)
- Gavin Ramjaun (presenter/reporter)
- Luke Blackall (presenter/reporter)
- Reya El-Salahi (presenter/reporter)
- Stefan Levy (presenter/reporter)
- Simon Thompson (entertainment producer/editor)
- Toby Earle (TV editor)

== David Icke interview ==
In April 2020, the UK’s culture secretary Oliver Dowden called on the media regulator Ofcom to take action against London Live after it broadcast a 105-minute interview with the conspiracy theorist David Icke which contained allegations about the source of the COVID-19 pandemic. The interview was an edited version of an interview Icke recorded with the YouTube channel London Real in March. YouTube deleted a later London Live interview with Icke and said it would wipe any other videos that falsely linked COVID-19 to 5G mobile networks.

Ofcom later confirmed that the 80-minute interview broke broadcasting rules, stating that Icke "expressed views which had the potential to cause significant harm to viewers in London during the pandemic" and his "claims went largely unchallenged" being "made without the support of any scientific or other evidence".

== Awards and nominations ==
Year	Association	Category	Nominee(s)	Result
2017	Diversity in Media Awards	Broadcaster of the Year	London Live	Nominated
