= Danielle St James =

Welsh model, entrepreneur and campaigner (born 1992)

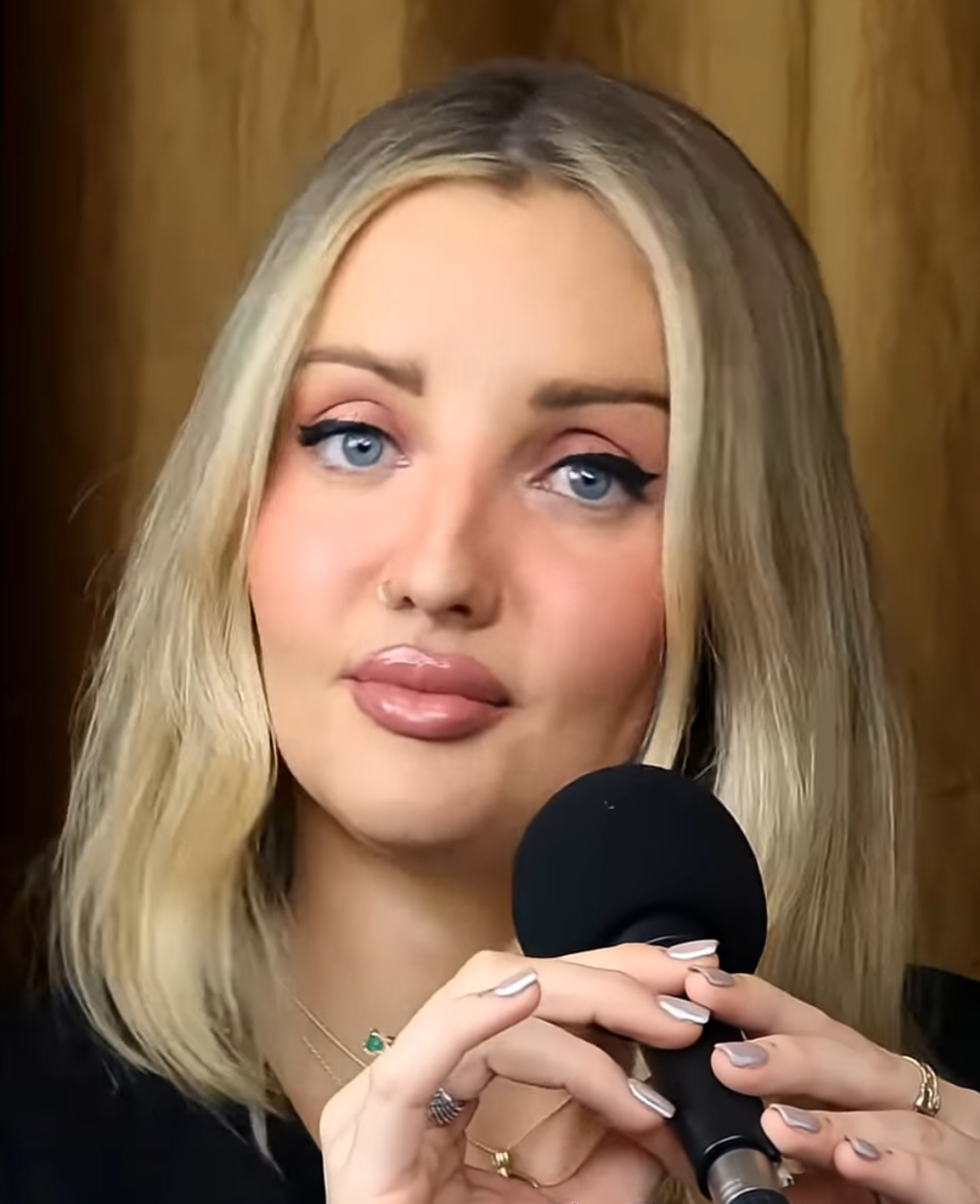
- St James in 2026
- Born: 18 April 1992 (age 34); Barry Island, Wales
- Other names: Dani St James; Dani Gibbison; Danielle Anson-Jones
- Years active: 2008–present
- Spouse: Alix Anson-Jones (m. 2023)

Danielle Zoah Anson-Jones (née Gibbison; born 18 April 1992), known professionally as Danielle or Dani St James, is a Welsh model, entrepreneur and campaigner.

== Early life ==
St James was born and grew up on Barry Island, South Wales, which she described as a "progressive" town for the time. Her parents separated when she was young; she and her older sister were raised primarily by their mother, while they have a younger half-sibling from their father's second marriage. She attended St Richard Gwyn Catholic High School.

== Career ==
St James began her career as a makeup artist in Cardiff in 2008. Upon moving to London in 2012 after her two-year stint as a dancer in Ibiza, St James worked as a night club manager, running the Shadow Lounge in Soho, Proud Camden, and Novus. She first appeared in the media when she entered the 2013 Miss Diamond Queen beauty contest.

Subsequently, St James featured in a 2016 video for the BBC Three YouTube channel, in the 2016 Our CLTR documentary web series Worship Trans, and in the Channel 4 programme First Dates in 2018.

During the COVID-19 lockdown, St James founded the charity organisation Not a Phase with Jacqui Devon. The concept started with the pair selling charitable merchandise designed by Devon sporting the titular phrase, with proceeds going to Mermaids. That year, St James featured in a Missguided shapewear campaign. Not a Phase grew into a "fully established charity" in its own right and expanded its services, operating in eight locations by 2023 that aim to "uplift" trans and gender-diverse adults in the UK and promote education about the community. Amid the re-election of Donald Trump in the U.S. in 2024, American sponsors began pulling back from supporting charities like Not a Phase. The organisation set up a funding appeal on 11 April 2025, boosted by the UK Supreme Court ruling on the definition of woman in the Equality Act and after actress Nicola Coughlan shared the fundraiser on Instagram.

In 2021, St James launched the inclusive swimwear and underwear brand Zoah, having first come up with the idea for it in 2017. Initially aimed at trans feminine people, Zoah added a line for trans masculine people in 2024 with support from Innovate UK. When formulating the line, Zoah used the grant to organise a focus group of over 400 trans guys to research their needs and challenges.

In autumn 2025, St James appeared on the cover of Glamour UK's Women of the Year with eight other transgender models.

== Personal life ==
St James is a trans woman. She was androgynous from a young age and realised she was trans around age 16 or 17. Upon moving to Ibiza after completing school, she started HRT at age 18. She said there was "never any drama" or pressure around it as her family were "very liberal" and accepting, particularly her mother. School also had unisex uniforms and toilets, and she was able to connect with the queer community in nearby Cardiff.

As of 2022, St James lives in Margate, Kent. She married Misfits creator and Not a Phase trustee Alix Maddison Anson-Jones in 2023, having become engaged in 2022.
