= List of Call the Midwife episodes =

The cover of the DVD box set comprising the first eleven series

Call the Midwife is a British period drama television series based on the best-selling memoirs of former nurse Jennifer Worth, who died shortly before the first episode was broadcast. It is set in the 1950s, 1960s and 1970s and for the first three series centred primarily on Jenny Lee (Jessica Raine), based on the real Worth. In the first episode, set in 1957, she begins a new job as a midwife at a nursing convent in the deprived Poplar district of east London. The programme's ensemble cast has also included Jenny Agutter, Pam Ferris, Judy Parfitt, Laura Main, Miranda Hart, Helen George, Bryony Hannah, Charlotte Ritchie, Linda Bassett and Emerald Fennell. Vanessa Redgrave delivers framing voiceovers in the role of "mature Jenny", and continues to do so even after the younger version of the character was written out of the series.

The idea of adapting Worth's books for television was initially dismissed by the BBC, but revived after Danny Cohen took over the post of Controller of BBC One. A full series was commissioned in 2011 and writer Heidi Thomas adapted Worth's books for the screen. The first episode was broadcast on 15 January 2012 and the initial series of six episodes drew positive reviews and large viewing figures, said by the BBC to be the highest audiences achieved by a new drama series on BBC One since the corporation's current method of measuring audiences began in 2001. Following the second episode, the BBC announced that a second series, expanded from six to eight episodes, had been commissioned. In September 2012 the programme won the Best New Drama award and Hart was named Best Actress at the TV Choice Awards.

The second series began on 20 January 2013, and during the run BBC Controller for Drama Ben Stephenson announced that he had commissioned a third series to be broadcast in 2014, despite the fact that all the original source material had been exhausted by the end of the second series. The series has also achieved success outside the UK. In the United States, the first series' transmission on PBS in the autumn of 2012 drew an average audience of three million viewers. This figure was 50% higher than the network's overall primetime average audience for the 2011–12 television season.

In February 2023, the BBC renewed the series through to a fifteenth series, keeping the show on the air until at least 2026. As of 10 March 2026, 131 episodes of Call the Midwife have aired, concluding the fifteenth series. A prequel series, set during the Second World War and with new actors, will follow later in 2026, followed by a feature-length film featuring the main cast and an eventual sixteenth series at a date to be confirmed.

== Series overview ==
Series	Episodes	Originally released		Avg. UK viewers (millions)
Series	Episodes	First released	Last released	Avg. UK viewers (millions)
1	6	15 January 2012	19 February 2012	10.61
2	Special	25 December 2012		10.47
2	8	20 January 2013	10 March 2013	10.47
3	Special	25 December 2013		10.54
3	8	19 January 2014	9 March 2014	10.54
4	Special	25 December 2014		10.41
4	8	18 January 2015	8 March 2015	10.41
5	Special	25 December 2015		9.95
5	8	17 January 2016	6 March 2016	9.95
6	Special	25 December 2016		10.33
6	8	22 January 2017	12 March 2017	10.33
7	Special	25 December 2017		9.26
7	8	21 January 2018	11 March 2018	9.26
8	Special	25 December 2018		9.04
8	8	13 January 2019	3 March 2019	9.04
9	Special	25 December 2019		8.34
9	8	5 January 2020	23 February 2020	8.34
10	Special	25 December 2020		8.14
10	7	18 April 2021	30 May 2021	8.14
11	Special	25 December 2021		7.64
11	8	2 January 2022	20 February 2022	7.64
12	Special	25 December 2022		6.96
12	8	1 January 2023	26 February 2023	6.96
13	Special	25 December 2023		6.86
13	8	7 January 2024	3 March 2024	6.86
14	Specials	25 December 2024	26 December 2024	6.90
14	8	5 January 2025	2 March 2025	6.90
15	Specials	25 December 2025	26 December 2025	6.00
15	8	11 January 2026	8 March 2026	6.00

== Episodes ==
=== Series 1 (2012) ===
No. overall	Episode	Directed by	Written by	Original release date	UK viewers (millions)
1	Episode 1	Philippa Lowthorpe	Heidi Thomas	15 January 2012	9.83
In 1957, Jenny Lee (Jessica Raine) arrives for her new job at Nonnatus House, a nursing convent in the Poplar district of London. The convent is home to a small order of nuns consisting of Sister Julienne (Jenny Agutter), Sister Evangelina (Pam Ferris), Sister Bernadette (Laura Main), and Sister Monica Joan (Judy Parfitt). Two other midwives, Beatrix "Trixie" Franklin (Helen George) and Cynthia Miller (Bryony Hannah), already work at the convent, as does handyman Fred Buckle (Cliff Parisi). Jenny also meets local physician Dr Patrick Turner (Stephen McGann). After some initial difficulties fitting in, Jenny's first assigned expectant mother is Conchita Warren, a Spanish woman who does not understand English and already has a huge family. Conchita suffers a concussion in a fall, which also triggers premature labour, making Jenny's first delivery a traumatic and difficult one which she must handle alone.
2	Episode 2	Philippa Lowthorpe	Heidi Thomas	22 January 2012	10.47
New midwife Camilla Fortescue-Cholmondeley-Browne, nicknamed Chummy (Miranda Hart), arrives at the convent to begin work. She hails from an upper-class background and aspires to become a Christian missionary, but finds getting to grips with her new job difficult and Sister Evangelina a harsh critic. While struggling to learn to ride a bicycle (which the midwives use to make their rounds), she encounters local policeman Peter Noakes (Ben Caplan). Meanwhile, Jenny befriends Mary, a pregnant teenaged girl from Ireland, who was forced into prostitution upon her arrival in London but wants to try to make a better life for herself and her child. Ultimately, reflecting the morals of the era, Mary's baby is removed from her after the birth.
3	Episode 3	Philippa Lowthorpe	Jack Williams	29 January 2012	10.66
While undertaking district nursing work, Jenny befriends Joe, (Roy Hudd) an elderly former soldier who now lives alone in a run-down, roach-infested flat, in a tenement block which has been condemned. Jenny attempts to revive his spirits by helping him attend an upcoming reunion of his old regiment. Meanwhile, Trixie and Cynthia deal with the case of a woman in her forties who is upset at having become pregnant comparatively late in life, even though her husband is delighted at the prospect. It is later revealed that her reluctance to give birth is because she fears that the child will be dark-skinned, the result of a brief affair. When the child is born, her husband adores the baby nevertheless.
4	Episode 4	Jamie Payne	Esther Wilson	5 February 2012	10.89
Jenny delivers a baby girl to Shirley Redmond, but soon afterwards the newborn disappears from her pram, leading to a tense and widespread search. Following a hunch, Jenny discovers the child was snatched by Mary, the Irish girl whom she had befriended previously and who was left traumatised by having her own child taken from her. At Jenny's request, the nuns of Nonnatus House petition the police not to prosecute the young runaway. Meanwhile, Cynthia deals with the case of a middle-aged headmaster and his young wife who are expecting their first child, but the couple are devastated when the wife is afflicted by eclampsia.
5	Episode 5	Jamie Payne	Harriet Warner	12 February 2012	10.42
The nuns and midwives come to the assistance of their cleaner, Peggy, whose brother has been diagnosed with cancer. While caring for him, Jenny learns about how the siblings grew up together in a harsh workhouse and how they developed an incestuous relationship which has persisted ever since. Meanwhile, Fred has acquired a pig and plans to make money by selling its bacon, but he soon discovers the pig is pregnant and can no longer bring himself to raise it for food. He enlists the help of the midwives, who for once must assist in the birth of animals rather than humans.
6	Episode 6	Jamie Payne	Heidi Thomas	19 February 2012	11.41
Sister Monica Joan, whose mental health has long been a concern, contracts pneumonia after roaming the streets at night in a state of emotional distress. She is subsequently arrested for theft and put on trial. Meanwhile, Chummy's mother visits her to pass judgement on PC Noakes, whom the midwife is courting, but the aristocratic but now impoverished Lady Browne clearly does not approve of her daughter's relationship with a working-class man. Desperate to please her mother, Chummy decides that the only course of action is to end her relationship with the policeman. The other midwives convince her to change her mind, and the episode concludes with the couple's wedding.

=== Series 2 (2013) ===
No. overall	Episode	Directed by	Written by	Original release date	UK viewers (millions)
Special
7	Christmas special	Philippa Lowthorpe	Heidi Thomas	25 December 2012	10.18
As it is Nurse Lee's first Christmas in Poplar, she is put in charge of caring for the destitute Mrs Jenkins alongside Sister Evangelina. Mrs Jenkins confuses Jenny with her daughter Rosie, from whom she was separated after being admitted to the workhouse. Chummy is busy preparing for the nativity play, which will be performed for the Mayor of Poplar, and all hands are needed to produce the ever-growing number of costumes and props needed. Meanwhile, a young teenage girl who helps her mother with her brothers is also secretly pregnant, and when a baby is left at the convent's front door, the infant's mother must be found.
Series
8	Episode 1	Philippa Lowthorpe	Heidi Thomas	20 January 2013	10.79
It is now 1958. Jenny is assigned a new patient, Molly Brignall, who has an abusive husband, and Jenny must handle the case very carefully. Trixie and Sister Evangelina are called to a foreign cargo ship docked in London and discover that the captain's daughter is about to have a baby. Her father has brought her along and allowed various members of the crew to have sex with her as a way of relieving the tensions of long periods spent at sea.
9	Episode 2	Roger Goldby	Harriet Warner	27 January 2013	10.24
A baby delivered by Cynthia dies in mysterious circumstances soon afterwards. The police become involved, and other pregnant women refuse to allow the shy young midwife to attend them, bringing Cynthia to the verge of a breakdown. Chummy's decision to apply to undertake missionary work in Africa leads her to question her priorities. Meanwhile, a chance encounter returns childhood friend Jimmy to Jenny's life, but she is surprised to find that he has a pregnant girlfriend.
10	Episode 3	Roger Goldby	Heidi Thomas & John Martin Johnson	3 February 2013	10.85
Jenny is reluctantly seconded to the London Hospital and finds herself working on the male surgical ward under a stern surgeon with whom she finds herself clashing. In the absence of Jenny and Chummy, a new orderly, the shy and withdrawn Jane Sutton (Dorothy Atkinson), fills in at Nonnatus House. The staff deal with a formidable pair of twins who share a husband. One of them is now pregnant and the other refuses to allow her sister to be treated by the midwives. Jenny once again crosses paths with Jimmy, who has been hospitalised, and she helps to save his life when the surgeon misdiagnoses him.
11	Episode 4	Roger Goldby	Mark Catley	10 February 2013	10.42
Back in Poplar, Jenny assists at the birth of a baby boy who is born with spina bifida. His parents cannot come to terms with their son's condition, which also distresses Jenny. Meanwhile, the mousy Jane undergoes a somewhat hesitant romance with the Reverend Thornton Applebee-Thornton, an Anglican priest staying at Nonnatus House.
12	Episode 5	China Moo-Young	Heidi Thomas	17 February 2013	10.15
Sister Bernadette suffers a crisis as she struggles to come to terms with her burgeoning romantic feelings for Dr Turner. Preparations are underway for the annual summer fete, and Trixie volunteers to enlist a celebrity judge for the baby show. But when she secures the services of a top television star, he turns out to have a darker side when he tries to force himself on her. Jenny meets an expectant mother who already has eight children and does not believe she will be able to cope with another. After Jenny's attempts to reassure her fail, she undergoes an illegal abortion, which leaves her fighting for her life.
13	Episode 6	China Moo-Young	Jess Williams	24 February 2013	10.26
Fearing an epidemic of tuberculosis, Dr Turner arranges for a mass X-ray programme to come to Poplar. When Sister Bernadette undergoes a chest X-ray to encourage a reluctant girl, she is devastated to discover that she has the illness. Jenny encounters a dying pub owner who lost almost his entire family to tuberculosis and must try to reconcile him with his only surviving child, his daughter who has been hiding a pregnancy.
14	Episode 7	Minkie Spiro	Harriet Warner	3 March 2013	10.68
Chummy and Peter return to Poplar, revealing the surprise that she is pregnant. Sister Evangelina and Fred try out a new scooter. Jenny tends to a Jamaican immigrant who struggles to deal with racial abuse from her neighbours even as she goes into labour, while Cynthia deals with a diabetic pub owner who bullies his wife. Sister Bernadette comes to a decision about her feelings for Dr Turner.
15	Episode 8	Minkie Spiro	Heidi Thomas	10 March 2013	10.38
As Chummy and Peter prepare to become parents, Fred has a visit from his daughter Dolly, who also has a baby on the way. Sister Bernadette's health crisis has passed, and she will soon be free to leave the sanatorium, but she must now decide whether to return to Nonnatus House or leave the order. Jimmy reappears, accompanied by his handsome colleague Alec, having been tasked by the council to survey the buildings in the area. Alec seems keen on Jenny, and an evening out to a jazz club sees romance blossom. Chummy goes into labour and gives birth to a son whom she names Fred. Sister Bernadette resigns as a nun, and she and Dr Turner become engaged. There is bad news for the midwives as Nonnatus House is earmarked for demolition.

=== Series 3 (2014) ===
No. overall	Episode	Directed by	Written by	Original release date	UK viewers (millions)
Special
16	Christmas special	Thea Sharrock	Heidi Thomas	25 December 2013	9.16
Shelagh (formerly Sister Bernadette) agonises alone over her decision to marry Dr Turner, who is desperate to get the children of Poplar vaccinated against polio. An unexploded German bomb is discovered in Poplar, forcing local residents to flee their homes for a refuge centre. Trixie tries to help a patient's husband, who has been traumatised by his time fighting in the Korean War. Polio strikes, putting Timothy in an iron lung. Feeling guilty, a distraught Shelagh seeks comfort with the nuns, joining her sisters in prayer and receiving Sister Julienne's reassurance that her marriage is meant to be. The detonation of the bomb rips through the foundation of Nonnatus House, making it uninhabitable. Shelagh and Dr Turner are married in the spring, with Timothy as best man.
Series
17	Episode 1	Thea Sharrock	Heidi Thomas	19 January 2014	11.35
It is now 1959, and the nuns and midwives move into a new Nonnatus House, joined by new arrival Sister Winifred (Victoria Yeates), while Chummy struggles to adjust to life as a housewife and mother. The weekly clinics also are at a new location, and it proves hard to raise awareness until Chummy manages to arrange for Princess Margaret to make an official visit. Jenny and Dr Turner find it hard to identify why a mother's two children are regularly ill, but an antique book belonging to Sister Monica Joan unexpectedly provides the clue that leads to a diagnosis of the then little-known condition cystic fibrosis. After delivering a baby in an emergency, Chummy is asked to return to Nonnatus House as a part-time midwife.
18	Episode 2	Juliet May	Harriet Warner	26 January 2014	10.83
Jenny is promoted to the position of nursing sister over the more experienced Trixie, which causes resentment between the pair. After attending a lecture by a prominent doctor, Cynthia attempts to introduce more modern approaches to relaxation and pain relief during childbirth, but meets resistance from Sister Evangelina. Ultimately, however, her methods are vindicated when they help a young mother cope with a difficult birth. Jenny deals with Doris, a mother with an aggressive husband whose delivery will reveal her infidelity. She plans to abandon the baby but is persuaded by Jenny to follow the proper procedures for having the infant adopted. Despite their best efforts, Doris' husband discovers her secret, forcing a more hasty and distressing parting between mother and child.
19	Episode 3	Juliet May	Liz Lake	2 February 2014	10.55
When the regular midwifery team at HM Prison Holloway is stricken with influenza, Sister Julienne and Trixie are drafted in to cover, and both find the conditions hard to deal with. Sister Julienne becomes involved with Stella Crangle, a heavily pregnant inmate who wishes to better herself and is afraid that after she has given birth the prison authorities will remove her child from her. Sister Julienne and Trixie meet Chaplain Tom Hereward while at the prison. Shelagh and Dr Turner long to start a family and are devastated when it is found that, as a result of her earlier tuberculosis, she is unable to have children. Fred secures theatre tickets as a treat for Chummy's birthday but is left embarrassed when they turn out to be counterfeit.
20	Episode 4	Juliet May	Gabbie Asher and Heidi Thomas	9 February 2014	10.23
When Jenny's boyfriend Alec invites her to spend the weekend with him in Brighton, she is suspicious of his motives. Soon afterwards, he is involved in an accident at work and, although he initially seems to be recovering, he takes a turn for the worse and dies, leaving Jenny devastated. Sister Winifred helps an elderly Jewish woman who has not left her flat for twelve years. Shelagh attempts to find a new purpose in life by reviving the Poplar Choral Society. Jenny is persuaded to take compassionate leave and go to stay at the nuns' "mother house" for a time.
21	Episode 5	China Moo-Young	Heidi Thomas	16 February 2014	10.15
With Jenny away and Sister Julienne taken ill, Shelagh takes over the administration of Nonnatus House and engages the services of Patsy Mount (Emerald Fennell), who has newly switched from nursing at the London Hospital to midwifery. The staff are planning a jubilee party to mark the anniversary of Sister Evangelina having taken her final vows, but she is opposed to the celebration. An attempt to contact her family leads to an unwelcome encounter with her brother, an alcoholic derelict. Meanwhile, Sally, a woman with Down's syndrome living in a residential home, has become pregnant. Her family are angry and believe that one of the staff must have abused her, but it turns out she has formed a relationship with Jacob, another resident at the home. The staff refuse to accept that the couple's relationship is genuine and, after the baby is stillborn, Jacob is removed to another home in Scotland. Jessica Raine retains top billing for this episode, even though she is only seen briefly in a non-speaking role.
22	Episode 6	China Moo-Young	Damian Wayling	23 February 2014	10.49
Trixie is delighted when handsome curate Tom Hereward invites her to a cricket match, but is less impressed to find that they are taking a group of Cub Scouts to Clacton-on-Sea in a run-down old bus that breaks down en route. Patsy recognises a patient's mystery ailment as the legacy of a tropical disease contracted in a prisoner-of-war camp in the Far East and reveals that she grew up in Singapore and was herself in an internment camp during the Second World War. Trixie helps a young couple of Irish runaways from Belfast who are unmarried and expecting their first child. Shelagh and Dr Turner resolve to look into adopting a child. Jessica Raine does not appear at all in this episode.
23	Episode 7	Minkie Spiro	Harriet Warner	2 March 2014	10.65
Jenny returns to work but is seconded to the London Hospital, where she finds her personalised approach to patient care hampered by strict regulations. Chummy is surprised to find that her parents have separated and invites her mother to stay, despite the haughty Lady Browne's disdain for her daughter's lifestyle. Later, Chummy is devastated to learn that her mother is suffering from terminal cancer. Sister Julienne and Cynthia help a young mother who, after giving birth, displays increasingly irrational behaviour, nearly jumping off a bridge with her baby. She is eventually diagnosed with puerperal psychosis and sent to a mental institution for treatment. Shelagh and Dr Turner's plan to adopt a child is threatened when background checks reveal that he spent time in a military mental institution after serving in the Second World War.
24	Episode 8	Minkie Spiro	Heidi Thomas	9 March 2014	10.09
Shelagh and Dr Turner are approved for adoption and become the parents of a baby girl. Chummy's colleagues rally round as her mother's condition deteriorates, and Lady Browne eventually dies peacefully in bed at Chummy's house. The experience has a particular effect on Jenny, who decides that her vocation now lies with caring for the terminally ill. She resigns from Nonnatus House, leaving midwifery behind to begin a new career as a Marie Curie nurse.

=== Series 4 (2015) ===
No. overall	Episode	Directed by	Written by	Original release date	UK viewers (millions)
Special
25	Christmas special	Thaddeus O'Sullivan	Heidi Thomas	25 December 2014	9.41
When harsh conditions at a home for unmarried expectant mothers are exposed, Chummy and Patsy are required to take over the running of the home. Later they help a young mother decide that she is not as set as she had thought on giving her baby up for adoption. Cynthia wrestles with a calling to become a nun, but an encounter with two former mental hospital inmates helps her to make up her mind, and she leaves midwifery behind to become a postulant. Although the character of Jenny was written out at the end of the previous series, Vanessa Redgrave continues to provide voice-overs as "mature" Jenny and appears on-screen for the first time in a framing sequence set in 2005.
Series
26	Episode 1	Thaddeus O'Sullivan	Heidi Thomas	18 January 2015	10.15
In 1960, new nurse Barbara Gilbert (Charlotte Ritchie) arrives to take up duties at Nonnatus House but struggles to make a good first impression, especially when a late-night drinking session with Trixie and Patsy leaves her extremely hungover. Trixie helps a family of four children who are regularly left alone by their mother in conditions of abject squalor, which brings back bad memories of her own childhood. Impressed by the qualities she displays in dealing with the situation, her boyfriend Tom asks her to marry him. Sister Evangelina finally seeks help for pains which have been troubling her for some time. Chummy temporarily leaves Nonnatus House to take over as matron of the mother and baby home.
27	Episode 2	Juliet May	Heidi Thomas	25 January 2015	10.49
Another new nurse, Phyllis Crane (Linda Bassett), joins the staff at Nonnatus House and infuriates the staff, especially Sister Evangelina, with her officious manner. Sister Julienne is delighted when a rich benefactor resolves to leave a legacy to the convent but finds herself tormented when it is revealed that it is a man, Charles Newgarden (Nicholas Farrell), with whom she shared a romantic relationship 30 years earlier. Barbara and Patsy are both devastated when they deliver a stillborn child to a young Trinidadian mother, but everyone is delighted when her labour continues and a healthy twin is born. Trixie's obsession with organising an extravagant engagement party threatens to drive a wedge between her and Tom.
28	Episode 3	Juliet May	Harriet Warner	1 February 2015	11.07
The community is outraged and opinions divided at Nonnatus House when an expectant father is charged with gross indecency, after being caught committing homosexual acts (at the time illegal in the United Kingdom). He is ordered to undergo hormone treatment, and the couple are despised and shunned by neighbours. Phyllis investigates when she realises that an impoverished Irish immigrant woman has lied about where she lives. Dr Turner and Shelagh are able to trace the source of an outbreak of dysentery to a food delivery service.
29	Episode 4	Amy Neil	Damian Wayling	8 February 2015	10.38
After an encounter with a young prostitute who is both pregnant and infected with syphilis, Sister Winifred attempts to spread the message of safe sex among the prostitutes of the neighbourhood. Barbara deals with a man who is so desperate to have a son to inherit the family business that he will not accept his wife delivering a daughter. Sister Monica Joan finds a new sense of purpose when she is unexpectedly called on to assist Shelagh with a birth. After learning that Tom will be assigned to a lower-class, far-off parish in Newcastle, Trixie breaks off her engagement to him. She passes out after consuming a large amount of alcoholic drink to cope, which forces an exhausted Barbara to serve as midwife in her third delivery of the day.
30	Episode 5	Dominic Leclerc	Carolyn Bonnyman	15 February 2015	10.73
When a baby suffers two fractures in mysterious circumstances, suspicion falls on his parents, who are Christian Scientists and hesitant against any medical treatment. Dr Turner arranges for the child to be taken into care but later realises that the baby actually has osteogenesis imperfecta, a rare bone disease. His guilt over the unnecessary suffering he put the parents through, combined with overwork, drives him to illness. Shelagh attempts to take over running the surgery but is not taken seriously until she dons a nurse's uniform. Barbara endeavours to help a Sylheti (Bengali) woman whose pregnancy is complicated by the fact that she cannot speak English and has diphtheria. Cynthia, now Sister Mary Cynthia, returns to Nonnatus House.
31	Episode 6	Dominic Leclerc	Heidi Thomas	22 February 2015	10.10
Sister Mary Cynthia befriends a group of Irish Travellers camped on a bombsite, but things become complicated when one of the women goes into labour just as police arrive to evict the travellers from the site. When an unwed, diabetic teenage girl finds she is pregnant, she is advised to have a termination due to the potential complications that her diabetes may cause. Rather than lose her baby, she goes on the run with her boyfriend; but without a supply of insulin she becomes dangerously ill, and her boyfriend must act quickly to save her life. Sister Evangelina returns from her medical leave.
32	Episode 7	Darcia Martin	Harriet Warner	1 March 2015	10.13
Two former school friends give birth at the maternity home on the same day, but in the confusion of a fire evacuation Sister Evangelina accidentally switches the babies. When the mistake is revealed, the two sets of parents have differing views on how the situation should be resolved. An elderly couple who have not been apart since the war must face separation when one is diagnosed with cancer. Fred proposes to shopkeeper Violet, while Patsy must conceal her relationship with nurse Delia.
33	Episode 8	Darcia Martin	Heidi Thomas	8 March 2015	10.22
Chummy returns to Nonnatus House. Trixie helps a deaf patient. A patient whose severe sickness is initially dismissed as mere nerves is diagnosed with the serious condition hyperemesis gravidarum but treated with the revolutionary drug thalidomide. Fred's daughter Marlene's interference causes his relationship with Violet to flounder, but with the help of Chummy, the couple are reunited and marry. Patsy is heartbroken when Delia is left with amnesia following a traffic accident and has no recollection of her. Trixie admits that she is an alcoholic and joins an alcoholic support group with the help of Sister Mary Cynthia.

=== Series 5 (2016) ===
No. overall	Episode	Directed by	Written by	Original release date	UK viewers (millions)
Special
34	Christmas special	Juliet May	Heidi Thomas	25 December 2015	9.30
The BBC plan to televise a carol service from Poplar, but Shelagh's plans for the event are thrown into chaos when the children's choir she has organised is quarantined due to a measles outbreak. Following a bout of illness and an argument with Sister Evangelina, Sister Monica Joan goes missing; and when a body is found in the river the nuns fear the worst. This proves to be a false alarm, however, and the elderly nun is eventually tracked down at the now-abandoned country estate which had been her childhood home, where she is being taken care of by a couple of squatters. A partly-recovered Delia re-enters Patsy's life.
Series
35	Episode 1	Syd Macartney	Heidi Thomas	17 January 2016	9.88
It is now 1961. When a baby is born with severe deformities, the midwives find it difficult to handle the situation, and the baby's father rejects her completely, to his wife's dismay. Trixie's new sideline as a keep fit instructor brings her into conflict with Sister Julienne, and she also becomes suspicious of the relationship between Barbara and Tom. Rather than return to Wales as her mother wishes, Delia is invited to move into Nonnatus House.
36	Episode 2	Syd Macartney	Harriet Warner	24 January 2016	9.77
Sister Evangelina's vocal opposition to mothers using formula milk causes a young woman who is unable to breastfeed to doubt her abilities as a mother and places her baby in danger through dehydration. In the aftermath of the incident Sister Evangelina asks to temporarily leave Nonnatus House to spend time with an enclosed order. Barbara is caught between an expectant mother and her husband, who is accused of being workshy. When it is discovered that he is actually terminally ill, his wife begs to have her baby induced before her husband dies. Phyllis develops feelings for a man she met at an evening class, plans to drive him on a country outing, but is shocked to find that he has concealed from her that he has a wife with dementia.
37	Episode 3	Sheree Folkson	Carolyn Bonnyman	31 January 2016	9.50
A new mother is diagnosed with typhoid, stirring up uncomfortable memories for Patsy, whose mother and sister died of the disease in a prisoner of war camp. Eventually, the young woman's grandmother is revealed to be a carrier of the disease, a situation which she struggles to accept. A young teacher, pregnant by a married man, loses her home and her job and is driven by desperation to attempt to abort her own baby, at the time a crime. Barbara agonises over whether to tell Trixie that Tom has invited her to dinner.
38	Episode 4	Sheree Folkson	Heidi Thomas	7 February 2016	10.05
A bright young man is delighted to gain a place at university, but his plans are complicated when his girlfriend discovers that she is pregnant, and he must decide what is the right thing to do. Sister Julienne is seconded to a hospital and witnesses another baby born with very severe birth defects. When the baby dies before its mother has even seen it, Sister Julienne must decide whether her faith permits her to conceal the truth about the birth from the mother. Meanwhile, Dr Turner and Shelagh begin to search for a cause for the birth defects. Trixie and Tom finally come to terms with the end of their engagement, and she gives her blessing to his relationship with Barbara.
39	Episode 5	Lisa Clarke	Harriet Warner	14 February 2016	9.62
When Phyllis's car breaks down on the way to a delivery, Delia must talk a young mother through her home birth over the telephone. Subsequently the mother begins to display erratic behaviour and finally goes missing. Phyllis learns of the young woman's past as a prostitute and, after tracking her down, tries to convince her that she does indeed deserve her new life. After reading up on new schools of thought linking cigarettes to cancer, Timothy Turner resorts to shock tactics to stop his parents' smoking habit. When Violet is incapacitated, Fred takes over running her shop, with disastrous results.
40	Episode 6	Lisa Clarke	Heidi Thomas	21 February 2016	9.66
Thora, a middle-aged woman, is pretending to be pregnant in order to conceal the fact that her unmarried daughter is expecting a baby. The Turners go on holiday, necessitating the appointment of a locum doctor. When the locum gives bad advice over the phone to Thora, she unwittingly places her daughter's life in danger. Trixie has to use all her skill to save the situation, and Thora is left coming to terms with the consequences of concealing secrets. A number of violent assaults take place on women in Poplar, and Sister Mary Cynthia becomes the latest victim. Traumatised at first, she eventually finds the strength to lead the police to the attacker.
41	Episode 7	Darcia Martin	Heidi Thomas	28 February 2016	10.20
Patsy assists Daisy and her family of itinerant barge-dwellers, who eschew many of the trappings of modern society. When Daisy rejects the opportunity to give birth at the maternity home after accusing Patsy of meddling, Patsy must deliver the baby on a barge at the height of a violent storm. The advent of the release of the contraceptive pill causes a dilemma for Sister Julienne, who worries about the moral implications. A young man who was compelled to marry his girlfriend when she became pregnant and is distant from her comes into his own as a husband and father when his wife is stricken with a potentially fatal condition. Sister Evangelina returns to the convent but reveals that she has suffered a stroke.
42	Episode 8	Darcia Martin	Heidi Thomas	6 March 2016	10.89
The Turners receive the news that the drug thalidomide, which the doctor had regularly prescribed for women suffering from morning sickness, has been withdrawn after being linked with birth deformities of the kind observed in recent months in Poplar. He must deal with his own guilt as he and Shelagh, with the help of Phyllis and Patsy, begin an effort to link the drug to the affected patients. A young man, recently returned to Poplar, makes haste to marry his Australian fiancee before the arrival of their baby, who is born at the couple's reception. After a brief return to work and struggles with her health, Sister Evangelina has a second stroke and dies, leaving the Nonnatus House community devastated and the people of the East End lining up to pay their respects.

=== Series 6 (2017) ===
No. overall	Episode	Directed by	Written by	Original release date	UK viewers (millions)
Special
43	Christmas special	Syd Macartney	Heidi Thomas	25 December 2016	9.21
Most of the Nonnatus House staff travel to a tiny rural mission hospital in South Africa, which is threatened with closure. There they hold a well-attended oral polio vaccination clinic. They find the health of the patients severely threatened by a dwindling and dirty water supply and must try to convince a local land-owner with a grudge against the establishment to allow a new life-saving pipeline to run across his farm. They also must deliver a baby out in the bush when their only lorry breaks down and cope with a distraught woman with false pregnancy, and a polio patient who was carried all day on his brother's back. When the hospital's only doctor is herself hospitalised with a life-threatening illness, it falls to Trixie to deliver a baby by Caesarean section. Tom proposes to Barbara, and the couple get engaged.
Series
44	Episode 1	Sheree Folkson	Heidi Thomas	22 January 2017	10.40
It is now 1962. Returning from South Africa (with the exception of Trixie, who is to remain at the clinic for two months), the staff are surprised to find that the stern Sister Ursula (Harriet Walter) has been placed in charge of Nonnatus House, with Sister Julienne relegated to lesser duties. Phyllis helps a mother who is desperate to escape her violent gangster husband. Concerns are raised for the mental health of Sister Mary Cynthia, and she is sent away to the mother house. Shelagh is surprised to learn she is expecting a baby, while Patsy receives a letter from Hong Kong informing her that her father is terminally ill.
45	Episode 2	Sheree Folkson	Harriet Warner	29 January 2017	9.89
Sister Ursula's strict rule at Nonnatus House continues, and she comes into conflict with both Patsy and Sister Winifred when she dictates that the staff should not provide additional, non-medical services for patients. Shelagh is caught up in the aftermath of an explosion at a warehouse, along with former army nurse Valerie Dyer (Jennifer Kirby). She subsequently campaigns for better facilities for the workmen, with the help of a young father who was injured in the blast and fears he has been blinded before he ever got to see his child. Phyllis begins to realise the extent of Patsy's relationship with Delia. Patsy helps an expectant mother who faces the prospect of a difficult birth due to her achondroplasia, and the case makes her realise that she needs to tend to her dying father, prompting her to leave for Hong Kong.
46	Episode 3	James Larkin	Carolyn Bonnyman	5 February 2017	10.38
Proposed government reforms to the way maternity care is provided mean that Dr Turner and Shelagh must prepare for an inspection of the maternity home and face the prospect of its closure. During the inspection, Shelagh is rushed to the hospital due to complications with her own pregnancy. Sister Ursula's latest edict at Nonnatus House is that the midwives must spend no longer than 20 minutes at each appointment. Under pressure due to the time limit, Barbara fails to notice that a baby is suffering from carbon monoxide poisoning due to a faulty water heater, and the baby is rushed to hospital with her life in the balance. Chastened by the incident and the effect of her attempted reforms, Sister Ursula returns to the mother house, restoring Sister Julienne to the helm at Nonnatus House. Trixie returns from South Africa, but having stayed at the mother house during her journey home, expresses concerns that Sister Mary Cynthia was not there.
47	Episode 4	James Larkin	Heidi Thomas	12 February 2017	10.19
An expectant mother struggling with debt since her husband left her decides that the solution to her problems is to give her baby to her childless cousin. However, when the child arrives she finds she cannot part with him. The incident has a particular impact on Tom, who reveals that he himself was adopted. Shelagh and Dr Turner face an anxious wait for news on their baby's condition, but when they hear the baby's heartbeat, they are relieved to learn that it is still alive. Sister Julienne secures funding to recruit a new midwife, but the search proves fruitless until she remembers former army nurse Valerie Dyer, who happily accepts the job.
48	Episode 5	Lisa Clark	Andrea Gibb	19 February 2017	10.63
Fred's cousin Ivy dies, leaving behind her son, Reggie, a 21-year-old with Down's syndrome. Fred and Violet take him in, but realising that his living with them indefinitely would be impractical, must decide whether the best option would be to commit him to a mental institution. While visiting the austere Linchmere Hospital, Fred and Sister Monica Joan are shocked to find Sister Mary Cynthia a patient there. They then find a much friendlier facility that offers gardening therapy and place Reggie there instead. Inspired by an expectant mother with very poor dental hygiene, Dr Turner spearheads a programme to improve the teeth of the borough's residents, during which Trixie is introduced to handsome dentist Christopher Dockerill (Jack Hawkins).
49	Episode 6	Lisa Clark	Louise Ironside	26 February 2017	10.22
Sister Mary Cynthia is released from the mental institution and returns to Nonnatus House. Her mental health issues persist, however, and she is eventually sent to the gentler Northfield Hospital near Birmingham. Valerie deals with the case of a woman from Somaliland, who was subjected to female genital mutilation as a child, leading to a complicated birth and a clash of cultures over the practice. Tensions run high during the Cuban Missile Crisis, and the Turners move into a new home.
50	Episode 7	Syd Macartney	Heidi Thomas	5 March 2017	10.39
Rhoda and Bernie Mullucks, whose third child and youngest daughter, Susan, was born with severely deformed limbs due to the effects of thalidomide, investigate the possibility of her being fitted with artificial limbs, but the experience causes tensions in their own relationship. Driving back from a successful delivery, Phyllis knocks over one of the family's other children with her car and is left devastated by the possible consequences. Trixie suspects that Christopher is seeing another woman, but learns that he actually has a child from a prior marriage, which he had not previously disclosed. In return for his revelation, she reveals to him her own struggles with alcoholism. Delia learns that Patsy's father has died in Hong Kong.
51	Episode 8	Syd Macartney	Heidi Thomas	12 March 2017	10.54
Barbara is distraught that her vicar father has accepted a missionary post overseas and will not be able to officiate at her wedding, so she brings the date forward and her friends rally round to help her organise the event in just three weeks. Shelagh gives birth to a baby boy. A mother who has been taking the contraceptive pill without her husband's knowledge develops a pulmonary embolism and dies, sparking concerns about the safety of the medication. Trixie agrees to meet Christopher's daughter, Alexandra. Patsy returns from Hong Kong and pledges her love for Delia.

=== Series 7 (2018) ===
No. overall	Episode	Directed by	Written by	Original release date	UK viewers (millions)
Special
52	Christmas special	Syd Macartney	Heidi Thomas	25 December 2017	9.57
The exceptionally harsh winter of 1962–63 causes disruption for the residents of Poplar. Valerie seeks to reassure an unmarried expectant mother that her partner, who is not the father, will be able to love the baby as his own. But when Valerie delivers the baby one month premature, he appears to be stillborn, which leaves all three grieving. On her way back to Nonnatus House, however, she discovers that the baby is actually alive. The death of a local man leads Sister Julienne to discover a dark history of emotional, physical and sexual abuse that have split the family. Tom and Barbara depart for Birmingham after he is appointed to a temporary post there. Meanwhile, Shelagh is forced to return to work as the weather increases pressure on Nonnatus and the practice.
Series
53	Episode 1	Syd Macartney	Heidi Thomas	21 January 2018	9.09
In early 1963, with Barbara away and Patsy and Delia having also departed, young Jamaican midwife Lucille Anderson (Leonie Elliott) joins the staff at Nonnatus House. Phyllis crosses swords with formidable policeman Sergeant Woolf, while handling the case of an elderly woman who is dying of cancer but refuses to leave her house even as the street around her is demolished. Handling the case of a single mother helps Trixie come to terms with the fact that boyfriend Christopher wishes to take their relationship further. Sister Winifred panics over taking her driving test and is delighted when she passes.
54	Episode 2	Claire Winyard	Louise Ironside	28 January 2018	8.81
Lucille experiences bigotry because of her West Indian background, and when a young woman unexpectedly suffers a stroke shortly after giving birth, her domineering mother blames Lucille. An expectant mother wishes her husband to be present at the birth, but he refuses. When his wife goes into labour, however, he must assist with the birth. The arrival of a beautiful young Hungarian au pair, Magda, shakes up the Turners' household.
55	Episode 3	Claire Winyard	Kelly Jones	4 February 2018	9.39
An expectant mother is diagnosed with the degenerative neurological disorder Huntington's disease, and quickly deteriorates to the point where she is unable to look after her children. It then is discovered that her daughter has a juvenile form of the disorder. Magda is shocked to discover that she is pregnant. After reading the Turners' medical books, she steals ergometrine from Nonnatus House in an attempt to induce an abortion but puts her own life in danger. Fred and Violet organise a charity beauty contest. Concerned for Christopher's young daughter, Trixie ends their relationship and turns to drink once again.
56	Episode 4	Rebecca Johnson	Lauren Klee & Heidi Thomas	11 February 2018	9.57
A Pakistani woman is aghast to find that, during a return to Pakistan, her husband has taken a second wife, a teenager who is now expecting a baby. Unable to have children herself, she is initially resentful of the second wife, but comes to her assistance when the young woman finds motherhood difficult. Sister Monica Joan is diagnosed with cataracts and risks losing her sight, but she refuses to have an operation until Fred persuades her otherwise. Trixie's personal problems continue to increase, and she is granted a leave of absence for six months.
57	Episode 5	Rebecca Johnson	Helen Blakeman	18 February 2018	9.33
Rumours that a newly arrived sailor from Nigeria is suffering from smallpox cause panic in the community, and he hides away in fear and shame. After determining that he instead has leprosy, the midwives find a place for him to receive healing care in a residential facility. Lucille endeavours to assist a pregnant woman who has developed a phobia of giving birth after an earlier traumatic delivery. Tom and Barbara return to Poplar.
58	Episode 6	Emma Sullivan	Louise Ironside	25 February 2018	9.33
An Irish family with two children and a third on the way arrive in Poplar to take over the newsagent's shop, but the husband is killed in a car crash. When the shop is damaged by a fire, Barbara and Fred lead efforts to get the family back on their feet. Valerie and Lucille lead health and relationship classes for teen girls at the youth club, but a stern mother complains about the sexual education. When Valerie digs deeper, she finds that the mother's attitude is coloured by her own sister's promiscuous behaviour in her teenage years. Valerie helps the mother track down her sister, who had been committed to an asylum. After complaining of a cold, Barbara is rushed to hospital with suspected sepsis. Meanwhile, Sister Monica Joan undergoes successful cataract surgery but must endure an annoying, talkative roommate in hospital.
59	Episode 7	Syd Macartney	Andrea Gibb	4 March 2018	9.57
Barbara's condition is diagnosed as meningococcal sepsis. At first she seems to be making a recovery, but she subsequently begins to deteriorate and dies, leaving everyone devastated. Dr Turner assists at a remand home, where he encounters a teenaged car thief, who is the same age as Timothy but has a pregnant wife. Dr Turner tries to help him to plead his case in court and later to cope in prison to overcome depression and bullying by other inmates.
60	Episode 8	Syd Macartney	Heidi Thomas	11 March 2018	8.99
The staff find the aftermath of Barbara's funeral hard to handle, and Sister Winifred tries to aid a grieving Tom by holding Barbara's uniform and midwife supplies rather than letting him give them away. They find comfort in organising a birthday celebration for Sister Monica Joan, but their joy is interrupted by the assassination of U.S. President John F. Kennedy. An expectant mother prepares for single motherhood after leaving her philandering husband, but she is distraught to learn that her widowed father has been in a long-term relationship with a man — who is now suffering from dementia and must move in.

=== Series 8 (2019) ===
No. overall	Episode	Directed by	Written by	Original release date	UK viewers (millions)
Special
61	Christmas special	Syd Macartney	Heidi Thomas	25 December 2018	8.94
The nuns are summoned back to their Mother House when Mother Jesu Emmanuel is found to be terminally ill. Mother Jesu wants Sister Julienne to be the new Superior, but Sister Julienne is hesitant. Ultimately she is not elected and is able to return to Nonnatus House, but Sister Winifred remains at the Mother House to work in the order's orphanage. Shelagh resolves to foster May, a Chinese orphan whose adoption is on hold. Trixie returns to Poplar and is surprised to learn that expectant mothers are increasingly deserting the services of Nonnatus House in favour of hospital births but is called on to help one such mother with an unexpected delivery in the middle of the street. The efficient Miss Higgins (Georgie Glen) arrives to organise the office at Doctor Turner's surgery and the Maternity Home.
Series
62	Episode 1	Syd Macartney	Heidi Thomas	13 January 2019	9.11
It is now 1964, and two new nuns, Sister Hilda (Fenella Woolgar) and Sister Frances (Ella Bruccoleri) join the Nonnatus House staff. Cathy, an aspiring model who has undergone an abortion, then illegal in the UK in most circumstances, needs Valerie's help dealing with the consequences. Cathy's sister wants the police to take action against the practitioner, but there proves to be little that they can do without Cathy's participation. The disposal of the nurses' old day bags causes emotional problems for Sister Monica Joan.
63	Episode 2	Kate Saxon	Louise Ironside	20 January 2019	9.13
Lucille becomes involved in the case of Clarice Millgrove, a proud former suffragette now living in an unsanitary house full of hoarded possessions. Fiercely independent, she refuses to move to a care home, even when ordered by the courts. A Ghanaian mother finds that she is suffering from sickle cell disease. Confident that her children will be safe from the condition, as it can only inherited if both parents have the disease, she is horrified to learn that her husband has been concealing his own symptoms. Violet stands for election to the borough council but is disappointed by Fred's lack of support.
64	Episode 3	Kate Saxon	Debbie O'Malley	27 January 2019	8.87
The Turners try to help an overprotective mother whose first child died and who now panics at the slightest sign of ill-health in her second. Valerie helps a mother of six whose latest child is born with a cleft lip and cleft palate. Struggling with his additional needs as well as a demanding family brings her to the verge of thinking that her new baby would be better off being adopted. Violet is elected to the local council. After hearing how local children dream of a trip to the seaside, Phyllis resolves to bring the beach to Poplar.
65	Episode 4	David O'Neill	Amy Roberts and Loren McLaughlan	3 February 2019	8.92
There is trouble at the maternity home when a mother and daughter who are both pregnant but are estranged from each other find themselves in adjacent beds. The two births, however, bring reconciliation. Trixie's friend Jeannie is disappointed to find that she is expecting a third child, as she had not wanted any more children. When Dr Turner explains he is unable to refer her for a legal termination, as the pregnancy does not risk her life, she pays for an illegal abortion. Soon afterwards, she develops a serious infection that results in her death. Phyllis goes on a date with the gruff policeman Sgt Woolf, with whom she had crossed swords on a number of previous occasions.
66	Episode 5	David O'Neill	Andrea Gibb	10 February 2019	9.04
Dr Turner and Trixie launch a new cervical screening clinic. An examination of Lois Parry, a young bride-to-be, reveals anomalies which lead to the discovery that she has intersex characteristics. Unable to cope with the revelation or to go through with her wedding, she unsuccessfully attempts suicide but ultimately finds support from her family and her understanding fiancé. Her case inspires Trixie to begin voluntary work at the Women's Advice Centre. Lucille cannot bring herself to act upon her new-found feelings for handsome mechanic Cyril Robinson (Zephryn Taitte) but ultimately agrees to go on a date with him. Meanwhile, Sgt Woolf asks Phyllis to spend more time with him.
67	Episode 6	Christiana Ebohon-Green	Carolyn Bonnyman	17 February 2019	9.11
With Phyllis in hospital due to a back injury, Nonnatus House staff await the arrival of another nun to assist and are surprised to find that it is the Mother Superior herself, Mother Mildred (Miriam Margolyes). After witnessing two generations of a dock-working family affected by serious medical conditions linked to their employment, she becomes involved in the fight for improved working conditions for the dockers. The dock workers are kept away from work after one is discovered to have contracted anthrax by unloading foreign bone meal. An unmarried teenage mother refuses to be forced to give her baby up for adoption, as had happened to her before; and Lucille helps her to face an uncertain future and get assistance. The Turners are upset as the date of May's adoption by another couple draws near. Lucille convinces Cyril to attend her church's gospel meetings for companionship, rather than pubs.
68	Episode 7	Christiana Ebohon-Green	Lisa Holdsworth	24 February 2019	9.05
Trixie cares for first-time mother Heather, whose symptoms lead to a diagnosis of gonorrhea, a sexually-transmitted infection acquired from her husband, who has been frequenting prostitutes. Mother Mildred insists that Sister Frances must begin attending births unaccompanied, despite her lack of confidence, and the young nun proves herself at a difficult delivery. Valerie is horrified to discover that her beloved grandmother Elsie is performing illegal abortions. Dr Turner pushes for the opening of a Brook Advisory Centre in Poplar, but Violet is reluctant to commit council money to the project.
69	Episode 8	Kate Cheeseman	Heidi Thomas	3 March 2019	9.08
Valerie reports her grandmother to the police, and Elsie is put on trial. Initially she pleads not guilty and is defiant about her actions; but the nuns persuade Cathy, the aspiring model who had an abortion earlier in the year, to testify. After hearing her evidence, Elsie changes her plea – preventing the need for Valerie to testify – and is sentenced to six years in prison. The Turners are saddened by May's departure, but after the adoption process collapses, she is returned to them. Sister Hilda helps a terminally ill young woman fulfill her dream by attending a dance.

=== Series 9 (2020) ===
No. overall	Episode	Directed by	Written by	Original release date	UK viewers (millions)
Special
70	Christmas special	Syd Macartney	Heidi Thomas	25 December 2019	8.69
Mother Mildred, Sister Julienne, Dr Turner, Shelagh, Phyllis, Trixie, Valerie, Lucille and Fred travel to the Outer Hebrides to assist communities lacking in medical facilities. Despite being left behind, Sister Monica Joan makes her own way to the islands, where she has an encounter that reaffirms her faith. Dr Turner must perform an emergency appendectomy on a new mother in a storm-lashed lighthouse without electricity. Phyllis and Trixie help Effie, a teenager rebelling against the confining island lifestyle. Back in Poplar, Reggie attempts to set a Guinness World Record for the world's longest Christmas paper chain.
Series
71	Episode 1	Kate Cheeseman	Heidi Thomas	5 January 2020	8.81
In early 1965, Fred finds a newborn baby abandoned in a dustbin at the maternity home, and a search begins for her mother. She is eventually found to be the housekeeper of a local Catholic priest, but Mother Mildred is unimpressed by the priest's callous and controlling attitude. With the help of Phyllis, an expectant mother moves from an unsanitary homeless shelter to a council flat, but shortly after she gives birth, her older son is diagnosed with diphtheria. Just as Mother Mildred brings her time at the convent to an end and returns to the order's mother house, Sister Julienne learns that Nonnatus House has been earmarked for demolition as part of a slum clearance.
72	Episode 2	Kate Cheeseman	Debbie O'Malley	12 January 2020	8.46
Florrie, a woman in her late 50s, forgets that she is minding her granddaughter and leaves her unattended. When Dr Turner diagnoses liver disease, Florrie's son-in-law suspects that she is a secret alcoholic, but his wife is unconvinced. Eventually Dr Turner identifies the cause as haemochromatosis (iron overload), which can be managed. Tina, a feisty young prostitute who is pregnant, claims that a previous child has gone to live in America, but Sister Julienne finds that he and his sister are actually in care in Poplar and will soon be adopted. Tina's life is endangered by the effects of an ectopic pregnancy, causing her to lose her baby, and Sister Julienne tries to ensure that Tina does not find herself in a similar situation again. Sergeant Woolf, who has been spending time with Miss Higgins, has a heart attack and decides to leave Poplar to live with his sister.
73	Episode 3	David O'Neill	Helen Raynor	19 January 2020	9.00
Lucille is seconded to St Cuthbert's hospital to supervise student midwives, but experiences racism from a difficult patient. On the way to the delivery room, the two of them become trapped in a lift, where Lucille must deliver the baby. Phyllis is concerned for the welfare of two Sylheti boys, Rahul and Jalal, who have recently arrived from East Pakistan (modern-day Bangladesh). When she visits their home, she finds that their mother is seriously ill but has been abandoned by her husband because of her condition. The midwives stage a fashion show to raise money for the maternity home's incubator fund.
74	Episode 4	David O'Neill	Paul Walker	26 January 2020	8.31
Concerned about Nonnatus House's place in a changing community and the threat of demolition, Sister Julienne agrees to four young male doctors residing at the convent as part of their training, but not all the residents are pleased by the arrangement. Fred and Reggie befriend George, an older man living in condemned housing. When George is taken ill with symptoms that baffle Dr Turner, one of the young trainee doctors diagnoses a condition caused by a reaction to the faeces of the pigeons which George breeds, and he must face giving up his beloved birds.
75	Episode 5	Noreen Kershaw	Jonathan Harvey	2 February 2020	7.98
A Poplar woman named Cheryl – distressed because her recently deceased grandmother, who led a very hard life, left £5 to Nonnatus House – accuses Sister Julienne of being out of touch with ordinary people. After Grace, a middle-aged woman driven to the brink of despair by the demands of her large family, also lashes out at her, Sister Julienne ventures out into Poplar without her habit. Sister Hilda helps Ron, an overprotective father who panics at the slightest suggestion that anything is wrong with his baby. Sister Monica Joan longs to see the hit film The Sound of Music.
76	Episode 6	Noreen Kershaw	Carolyn Bonnyman	9 February 2020	8.21
Sister Julienne finally breaks the news to the rest of the staff about the impending demolition of Nonnatus House, leaving them worried for their future. The Turners' hopes of adopting May face a hurdle when her mother, who was believed dead, comes to London and says she wants to take her daughter back to Hong Kong. Valerie's cousin is overjoyed when her baby is born on what would have been her own father's birthday, but soon after the birth her son is diagnosed with a number of life-limiting conditions. Kevin McNulty, one of the young doctors who stayed at Nonnatus House earlier in the year, returns to work alongside Dr Turner. Sister Monica Joan has a unique way of honoring St. Raymond Nonnatus at the Poplar Horticultural Celebration.
77	Episode 7	Syd Macartney	Andrea Gibb	16 February 2020	7.90
Trixie helps Marion, an expectant mother who is blind but does not believe this will stop her caring for her child. Marion's sister has other ideas, however, and reports her to social services. When the baby is born, Marion has to learn to accept help. Dr McNulty appears to be settling in well, but he is troubled by an old injury and resorts to stealing pain relief drugs. Valerie is concerned for the well-being of her grandmother in prison.
78	Episode 8	Syd Macartney	Heidi Thomas	23 February 2020	8.01
Sister Julienne is notified that the council is reducing funding to Nonnatus House at the same time that the rent payments are increased, putting the order's future in doubt. Valerie's grandmother is hospitalised and diagnosed with cancer. She is released into Valerie's care, which proves difficult for both of them; Valerie sits by her deathbed but misses the moment of her actual death. Two of the midwives' patients turn out to be pregnant by the same man. Dr McNulty's drug problems come to light. An impassioned speech to the council by Trixie and the support of the local community lead to a stay of execution for Nonnatus House, but only for a year.

=== Series 10 (2021) ===
No. overall	Episode	Directed by	Written by	Original release date	UK viewers (millions)
Special
79	Christmas special	Syd Macartney	Heidi Thomas	25 December 2020	8.19
Valerie leaves Nonnatus House to work at Hope Clinic in South Africa. A circus is in town and the proprietor's daughter is heavily pregnant; the proprietor himself has been concealing from her that he has been battling cancer. Shelagh encounters an old acquaintance who has experienced seven miscarriages and is reluctant to make proper preparations for her upcoming birth. At her godmother's insistence, Trixie joins a "marriage bureau" but experiences unsatisfactory results. Sister Monica Joan breaks her leg in a fall and faces the prospect of spending weeks in hospital, but Lucille is insistent that she must be home for Christmas.
Series
80	Episode 1	Ann Tricklebank	Heidi Thomas	18 April 2021	8.83
The year is now 1966. Trixie is seconded to the Lady Emily Clinic, a private facility in the exclusive Mayfair area of London, in preparation for Nonnatus House forming a working partnership with the clinic, which it is hoped will solve the convent's financial problems. Dr Turner, a firm advocate of free treatment through the National Health Service, is strongly opposed to the proposal. The birth of a baby with no legs below the knee, who does not survive after birth, prompts fresh concerns about the drug thalidomide, but Dr Turner soon discovers that the father was exposed to radiation from nuclear tests while serving with the armed forces. As she continues her rehabilitation, Sister Monica Joan suffers a crisis of faith.
81	Episode 2	David O'Neill	Jonathan Harvey	25 April 2021	8.48
Trixie befriends Fiona, a patient at the Lady Emily Clinic, but learns that the new mother has severe leukemia; Fiona dies shortly afterwards. Trixie is also shocked to find that abortions, still illegal at the time, are being carried out at the clinic, leading Sister Julienne to abandon plans for the partnership between the two organisations, despite its potential impact on the convent's finances. Lucille and Cyril help a family who have been made homeless. Sister Frances worries that, having been a nun since the age of 17, she is too unworldly to truly understand patients' issues. Her influence, however, causes a husband to stand by his wife even though she has had a baby by another man.
82	Episode 3	David O'Neill	Debbie O'Malley	2 May 2021	8.43
Dr Turner deals with a young woman who claims she is pregnant, although tests show otherwise. She continues to claim a varying range of symptoms, which confuse Dr Turner and Sister Hilda but is ultimately diagnosed with a psychological condition that prompts her to seek medical attention she does not require. After reading a medical paper, Lucille identifies that a patient has developed the little-understood condition of latent diabetes of pregnancy. Shelagh proposes establishing Nonnatus House as a training centre for pupil midwives, which would bring with it increased funding.
83	Episode 4	Noreen Kershaw	Heidi Thomas	9 May 2021	8.06
The pupil midwives begin their studies, including the excitable Nancy Corrigan, who is to live at Nonnatus House. On her first day of rounds her manner unsettles a patient so much that she opts for a hospital birth instead of a home delivery. Ultimately, however, Nancy proves her skills when she must take charge of the birth, with advice from Sister Monica Joan, when the patient is unable to make it to hospital. Dr Turner and Phyllis deal with a patient who is tormented by his own homosexuality. After revealing his secret to his parents, he is rejected by them and checks into a clinic which claims to be able to cure homosexuality, where Dr Turner discovers him being subjected to harsh aversion therapy. Poplar is gripped by enthusiasm for the football World Cup, but Fred misses out on a huge accumulator bet win when England win the final. Trixie attends the christening of the son of Fiona Aylward, the patient who died earlier in the year. Cyril proposes to Lucille.
84	Episode 5	Noreen Kershaw	Joe Ainsworth	16 May 2021	8.09
Dr Turner is concerned by the lack of development exhibited by an expectant mother's older child. A chance remark by Shelagh enables him to diagnose the very rare condition phenylketonuria. The mother blames herself for not noticing the problem earlier and fears her new baby may also be affected. Nancy crosses swords with the controlling mother of a teenage patient, whose baby is taken away for adoption much sooner after his birth than she was expecting. Trixie spends more time with Matthew Aylward (Olly Rix) and his son and helps with the hiring of a new nanny. Dr Turner's son Tim gains entry to medical school at Edinburgh University, planning to follow in his father's footsteps.
85	Episode 6	Afia Nkrumah	Andrea Gibb	23 May 2021	8.00
Sister Frances launches an initiative to engage more closely with the women of Poplar's Asian community, many of whom refuse to use the services of a midwife. One such patient, Mrs Gupta, is still traumatised by her experiences of violence during the partition of India. Trixie encounters Cherry, an unhappy patient who is pregnant with her fifth child and has an abusive husband. On her next visit to the clinic it is revealed that Cherry tried to crudely abort her own baby. The case inspires Trixie to write to The Times supporting the legalisation of abortion, but the letter causes controversy at Nonnatus House. Soon afterwards, she is invited to be interviewed on a BBC radio programme. Nancy reveals her secret, that she had a baby when she was 16, who now lives in a London orphanage.
86	Episode 7	Thomas Hescott	Heidi Thomas	30 May 2021	7.11
Sister Frances is horrified by the unsanitary conditions in a tenement building where one of her patients lives and gives birth, and enlists the help of Violet in her role as a councillor. When the company that owns the building is tracked down, Trixie is surprised to find that Matthew Aylward is on the board and then shocked by his lack of action. Later he pledges financial aid to Nonnatus House in his wife's memory, securing the convent's future. Nancy removes her daughter from the orphanage over concerns the girl has been abused, and the pair go missing for a time; but she returns and is ultimately permitted to remain at Nonnatus House despite being an unmarried mother. A woman's baby is born with Down syndrome, and her husband initially finds it hard to deal with. A conversation with Fred Buckle about Reggie, along with the family spending time with Reggie, changes his view. Cyril and Lucille announce their plan to marry at Christmas in Poplar.

=== Series 11 (2022) ===
No. overall	Episode	Directed by	Written by	Original release date	UK viewers (millions)
Special
87	Christmas special	Syd Macartney	Heidi Thomas	25 December 2021	7.81
Lucille and Cyril prepare for their Christmas wedding, but an accident during the hen party leaves her with an eye injury, leading her to insist that the wedding must be called off. Dr Turner's drastic approach is to use medicinal leeches, which solves the problem, and the wedding goes ahead. Dr Turner attends a house call which embroils him in the circle of a group of gangsters. The wife of one of them is pregnant but is using heroin. She has been hiding her addiction due to her husband's hatred for the drug, as his younger brother died from it. After the birth, the baby also exhibits signs of addiction. The Turners are shocked to learn from Mother Mildred that May was born under similar circumstances in Hong Kong. The husband reconciles with his wife, and she begins the journey to recovery. Sister Frances handles her first breech birth.
Series
88	Episode 1	Ann Tricklebank	Heidi Thomas	2 January 2022	7.37
At Easter 1967, Nancy begins her first day as a qualified midwife. Later she finally tells her daughter the truth about their relationship. Trixie visits Matthew Aylward at a demolition site where the workmen are shocked to find the remains of two babies. The police investigation leads to an old woman with dementia, who is suspected of being the mother of the babies until her daughter confesses that it was actually she who gave birth to and hid the infants. She had been repeatedly taken advantage of by a married man and kept the pregnancies hidden out of fear and shame. Both babies were stillborn. The police decide not to press charges – as the daughter has a history of depression, which is now believed to be the result of those experiences – and instead decide to send her to get help. Derek and Audrey Fleming, whose previous baby was born with deformities linked to Derek's exposure to radiation while in the army, are expecting another child and concerned about complications. Much to everyone's joy and relief, Audrey delivers a healthy baby girl.
89	Episode 2	Noreen Kershaw	Nicola Wilson	9 January 2022	7.96
At the regular cervical screening clinic, Trixie discovers that a patient is suffering from scabies. The condition rapidly spreads through the community. Another young clinic patient's tests reveal that she has cervical cancer. She is offered a hysterectomy, which may remove the cancer but struggles with the idea of a future in which she will not be able to have children. Lucille loses the trust of a patient after being pressured by a social worker into an awkward conversation with her about contraception.
90	Episode 3	Thomas Hescott	Jonathan Harvey and Heidi Thomas	16 January 2022	7.41
The issue of homeless men drinking methylated spirits becomes a concern for the people of Poplar. After Nancy helps one such man in his last days, Violet resolves to provide facilities in the community for people struggling with alcoholism. Phyllis helps an expectant mother whose pregnancy jeopardises her hopes of a career as a professional singer. After Sister Julienne is taken ill, she asks Shelagh to take over organising an event to mark the centenary of the order's work in Poplar, which upsets Sister Hilda, who had hoped to be asked. Trixie and Matthew begin a relationship.
91	Episode 4	David O'Neill	Lena Rae	23 January 2022	7.52
Trixie attempts to help a new mother who is struggling to cope but refuses to ask for assistance, largely because she is comparing herself with her twin sister, who seems to be coping admirably with motherhood. The Polish-born Jewish husband of one of the midwives' patients is tormented by his memories of his time in a Nazi concentration camp. Later Sister Hilda arranges for him to have the bar mitzvah that he missed out on as a teenager. Trixie and Matthew's relationship continues, but he needs some pointers from Nancy on how to be romantic. Cyril hopes to obtain a job more in keeping with his qualifications but is rejected after an interview. Later Lucille reveals to him that she is pregnant.
92	Episode 5	Sarah Esdaile	Heidi Thomas	30 January 2022	7.75
Trixie attends to a patient left paraplegic after a fall from a crane. Glenda, his wife, is resistant to accepting outside assistance. Later, it is discovered that Glenda has been physically abusing both her husband and children. However, with Trixie's help, the husband finally stands up to Glenda and decides to press charges. Glenda is forced to move out of her home, while the husband and his children begin a new life free of fear. While in the throes of a delivery, Lucille realises she is miscarrying her own baby. Phyllis is shocked to learn she has won a Premium Bond prize of £5,000 (equivalent to £80,000 in 2025) and resolves to take a holiday in continental Europe. Trixie also departs to care for her terminally ill godmother in Portofino.
93	Episode 6	James Larkin	Lucy Catherine	6 February 2022	7.56
Matthew discovers a group of hippies living in one of his warehouses. One of them, Clover, is heavily pregnant and determined to deliver the baby with only her friends to help. When she goes into labour and is unable to get anyone's attention due to the group's being high on drugs, Matthew arrives just in time to call for help, and Shelagh delivers the baby. The baby is born with the potentially life-threatening condition gastroschisis but survives surgery, and Clover is reunited with her estranged father. Angered by a lack of action from the local health committee, Dr Turner resolves to roll out a programme of measles vaccination. Perturbed by a series of what she takes to be bad omens, Sister Monica Joan seeks the assistance of an eccentric clairvoyant. Although she is ultimately able to help the woman with her own problems, the elderly nun is left shaken when the clairvoyant predicts that an unfortunate event will occur at Nonnatus House.
94	Episode 7	Syd Macartney	Lisa Holdsworth	13 February 2022	7.61
Sister Frances befriends Carole, a troubled teenaged mother who has only recently left foster care and is struggling to adjust to living alone. When Carole collapses, it is discovered that she is pregnant once again, and when she goes into premature labour, Sister Frances is the only one who can provide emotional support. The baby is stillborn, and Sister Frances must comfort a grief-stricken Carole, who also feels guilt over not having wanted the baby in the first place. Sister Julienne, Dr Turner, and Nancy attend a midwifery conference; but as their train passes through Poplar on the way back, it crashes into another train, causing widespread damage. The episode ends with it unclear whether Dr Turner and Sister Julienne have survived.
95	Episode 8	David Tucker	Heidi Thomas	20 February 2022	7.90
In the aftermath of the train crash, the staff of Nonnatus House rally round to help the injured. Dr Turner and Sister Julienne have survived but are injured and trapped in the train. While trapped, Sister Julienne and Turner comfort an older woman and former patient who was serving tea on the train and soon dies of her injuries. In the middle of a delivery, Sister Hilda finds that her patient's husband was the driver of the train and has died. His distraught widow must come to terms with having to raise her now-two children alone. While at first it is believed the crash was caused by the driver's negligence, it is discovered that he suffered a seizure from an undiagnosed brain tumour, which caused him to lose control of the train. Alerted to the situation at Nonnatus House by Miss Higgins, Phyllis returns from her holiday to take charge. Sister Julienne suffers a suspected heart attack, leaving her colleagues fearing the worst, but both she and Dr Turner make a full recovery. Sister Frances continues to help Carole and ends up finding the girl a family in an unexpected place

=== Series 12 (2023) ===
No. overall	Episode	Directed by	Written by	Original release date	UK viewers (millions)
Special
96	Christmas special	Ann Tricklebank	Heidi Thomas	25 December 2022	7.81
At Christmas 1967, the residents of Poplar still find it hard to move on after the train crash. Fred resolves to improve local morale by organising a talent show. Sister Hilda leaves Nonnatus House, but Trixie returns. Cindy, a pregnant woman recently released from prison, finds herself abandoned by her fiancé and homeless. Rhoda Mullucks, the mother of one of the children affected by the Thalidomide scandal several years earlier, is pregnant again, and husband Bernie is finding it hard to cope. Trixie helps him seek support for his alcoholism. Rushing back to a difficult birth after using a telephone box, Sister Frances falls off her bicycle and must assist Lucille at the birth with only one functioning arm, before departing for the Mother House to recuperate. Matthew proposes to Trixie.
Series
97	Episode 1	Syd Macartney	Heidi Thomas	1 January 2023	6.74
In April 1968, the forthright Sister Veronica (Rebecca Gethings) becomes the newest addition to the Nonnatus House staff, but it turns out she has a reputation for being economical with the truth. Nancy ministers to Olive, a woman with terminal cancer who is in a secret relationship with another woman. Lucille longs for the home country she has not seen for years. She is shocked by MP Enoch Powell's speech denouncing Commonwealth immigration and the reaction of local people, culminating in her walking out of a delivery room after the patient abuses her. Trixie finds the prospect of a pre-wedding gathering with Matthew's late wife's parents difficult.
98	Episode 2	Syd Macartney	Lena Rae	8 January 2023	7.23
Lucille is still troubled, especially after learning that her sister in Jamaica is pregnant. Her latest patient on the district round is an old man who is losing his eyesight, and his situation drives her further into despair. Finally she seeks medical help from Dr Turner, and Cyril buys her an open return ticket to Jamaica. Lilian, one of Sister Julienne's expectant patients, discovers that she has a rare form of breast cancer. She is unhappy that impeding radiotherapy means the birth must be induced in hospital, but before this can happen she gives birth at home, as she had hoped. Her husband taking the lead in the childcare at Sister Julienne's suggestion only makes Lilian feel worse.
99	Episode 3	Sarah Esdaile	Nicola Wilson	15 January 2023	7.01
Sister Veronica visits Sandy, a mother who has not been bringing her child to the health clinic. Sandy has recently remarried and confesses to the nun that her new husband has been sexually assaulting her. She leaves him but the police are unable to help under the laws in force at the time. A baby is born with haemophilia, upsetting his mother, who was unaware that her father had the same condition, leading to a family disagreement. Nancy runs into severe financial difficulties after buying too many gifts for her daughter. Trixie attempts to improve her cooking skills so as to be able to impress Matthew's society friends.
100	Episode 4	Corin Campbell Hill	Lucy Catherine	22 January 2023	6.92
Phyllis attends a ventouse training course and is hurt when the doctor leading the training casts aspersions upon her age. Later she receives a summons to appear before a London Board of Health committee, leading her to worry that she will be ordered to retire. After Sister Monica Joan gives an impassioned speech in her defence, the board members agree to allow Phyllis to continue to practice, but the chairman hints that the authorities are not happy with Nonnatus House's methods. An outbreak of gastroenteritis at the maternity home means that the facility must be quarantined, putting the staff under huge pressure. Reggie is concerned that he is terminally ill due to his constant tiredness, but it turns out only to be an underactive thyroid.
101	Episode 5	James Larkin	Heidi Thomas	29 January 2023	6.70
Matthew's father pays a visit to Poplar and clashes with his son over their business dealings; days later, the elder Aylward suddenly dies. Spencer, a new father, worries his family with his schizophrenic behaviour; Cyril prevents him harming the baby but is stabbed. The chairman of the board of health visits Nonnatus House unexpectedly and subsequently decrees that henceforth all the staff will be directly employed by the NHS and must follow its practices. Shelagh believes she is pregnant again and both she and her husband are unsure if they are happy. Cyril recovers from his injury but learns that Lucille has taken a job in Jamaica and will not be returning for six months.
102	Episode 6	David Tucker	Sally Abbott	5 February 2023	6.99
Trixie does her best to support Heather, who has given birth at the age of 15. Heather wishes to give her baby up for adoption, but as she is a minor the decision rests with her parents and they are adamant that she will not have any say. Angered at their attitude, she absconds from the maternity home; upon her return, Trixie supports her in court, where Heather's parents accept that they must treat her differently going forward. Sister Veronica pushes Dr Turner to launch a programme of medical check-ups for child workers. Joey, a young paperboy, attends the clinic and is hospitalised with what turns out to be leukemia, leaving him worried about who will support his family. Cyril travels to Jamaica to visit Lucille. Sister Monica Joan finds companionship with a stray dog.
103	Episode 7	Ruth Platt	Lisa Holdsworth	12 February 2023	6.85
Nancy makes a home visit to Imelda, who lives with her husband and son in a caravan on a building site; while they are at the housing office seeking permanent accommodation, the caravan is removed, forcing them to squat in an abandoned building, where she gives birth. Cyril returns from Jamaica alone and begins volunteering at a hostel for the homeless. Shelagh is concerned about the symptoms of Rosemary, who is expecting her fifth child, leading to a diagnosis of hepatitis; Sister Monica Joan also contracts the condition, leading her friends to fear the worst. Matthew takes a stand against Poplar's housing crisis.
104	Episode 8	David Tucker	Heidi Thomas	26 February 2023	7.23
Trixie's wedding is close at hand and her friends save the day when she learns that Matthew's mother has sold the family tiara she planned to wear. Sister Julienne is surprised to learn that Nancy has applied for another job, partly out of concern that Nonnatus House will close. Phyllis is upset when Nancy is offered the new job, but delighted to learn that Matthew has bought Nonnatus House and that the future of the convent is safe. On the way to the wedding, Dr Turner and Shelagh witness one of their patients being killed in a car crash but are able to deliver her baby alive. Sister Monica Joan rallies to attend the wedding.

=== Series 13 (2024) ===
No. overall	Episode	Directed by	Written by	Original release date	UK viewers (millions)
Special
105	Christmas special	Syd Macartney	Heidi Thomas	25 December 2023	7.66
In December 1968, Nancy's daughter Collette moves into Nonnatus House with her. A depressed Sister Monica Joan is convinced that it will be her final Christmas; her friends attempt to rally her spirits by re-enacting a Christmas she remembers fondly from her Victorian childhood. Cyril helps Mr Sharma, a former wartime airman fallen on hard times and living in a condemned basement dwelling. Despite debilitating medical issues, Mr Sharma, scarred by how he was treated during the war, refuses to see a doctor. Brenda, who has been treated with fertility drugs, unexpectedly gives birth to quadruplets; another new mother, with whom Brenda had personal issues when they were in school together, helps her to feed them and, in the absence of her sailor boyfriend, is in turn supported by Brenda's mother.
Series
106	Episode 1	David Tucker	Heidi Thomas	7 January 2024	6.81
Four new trainee midwives arrive at Nonnatus House in March 1969, including Rosalind Clifford (Natalie Quarry) and Joyce Highland (Renee Bailey), who will also be living there and find living among nuns something of a culture shock. Rosalind's first birth is complicated when the police arrive to arrest the mother's criminal husband, who is armed with a gun. Doreen, who has cerebral palsy, is heavily pregnant, which angers her mother. Doreen's patient records indicate that she was injured at birth and that Sister Julienne delivered her, a fact that the nun finds hard to handle. Nancy clashes with Phyllis over a new campaign for increased wages for nurses.
107	Episode 2	Avril Evans	Nicola Wilson	14 January 2024	6.35
Shelagh and Joyce assist at the birth of Edna's son, but are concerned by the health of Edna's daughter. She is soon hospitalised with breathing difficulties linked to mouldy conditions in their council flat. An angry Shelagh takes on the council, who had failed to take action. Nancy and Dr Turner become involved in the case of Sahira, who has been suffering with unexplained symptoms; she is diagnosed with porphyria and advised to avoid ever having children, devastating her and her husband. Cyril resolves to retrain as a social worker. The pay campaign continues to gather momentum.
108	Episode 3	Jo Southwell	Sally Abbott	21 January 2024	6.71
Violet runs for the position of mayor of Tower Hamlets but faces competition from a sexist fellow councillor who is also a slum landlord. Fred cuts himself and contracts a case of tetanus which lands him in intensive care. Gillian, a fashion model who hopes to involve her child in her work, gives birth to a daughter with hip dysplasia, which she finds hard to deal with. Violet is elected mayor and Fred makes a full recovery.
109	Episode 4	John Maidens	Susan Everett	28 January 2024	6.85
In July 1969, everyone in Poplar is excited about the Apollo 11 moon landing. The discovery of tuberculosis in a family newly arrived from Nigeria brings back painful childhood memories for Nancy. Distracted by drama at home, Trixie mistakenly overrules Joyce, with the result that a patient's partially retained placenta is not diagnosed, putting her life in danger. Matthew questions Trixie's priorities.
110	Episode 5	Sarah Esdaile	Chloe Moss	4 February 2024	7.06
At the height of summer, Violet organises a community outing to the seaside. While there, May gets into difficulty in the sea; upon their return to Poplar she is hospitalised with water aspiration. Following the incident, the authorities have concerns about whether the Turner family should continue to foster her. Phyllis delivers Lindy Webster's second baby; shortly afterwards, it is discovered that both Lindy's children have retinoblastoma, a cancer of the eye.
111	Episode 6	David O'Neill	Katerina Watson	11 February 2024	7.11
Two young boys are found in a local church, abandoned by their mother. Soon afterwards, their mother is found, pregnant and in a depressed state; Cyril becomes involved with her case and is unsure what recommendation to make. Matthew confesses to Trixie that he has been stripped of the company directorship he inherited from his father and faces financial ruin. Dr Turner cares for a woman who has a rare cancer caused by asbestos exposure. Rosalind and Joyce both pass their final exams and are offered permanent jobs at Nonnatus House.
112	Episode 7	Sarah Esdaile	Lisa Holdsworth	25 February 2024	7.08
A man comes to visit Joyce and tells her colleagues that he is her cousin but when they are alone it is revealed that he is in fact her estranged husband and that she has assumed a new identity since leaving him. Trixie's worries increase as Matthew plans a new scheme to resolve his money worries which leads to him moving to New York without her. Rosalind helps deliver the baby of Alison, a naive teenager; shortly afterwards it is revealed that the baby's father is Alison's own stepfather and that he has been abusing her since she was 10 years old.
113	Episode 8	David Tucker	Heidi Thomas	3 March 2024	6.92
Miss Higgins, Dr Turner's secretary, reveals that she had a son, whom she gave up for adoption, while living in India decades earlier. Now an adult, he and his wife come to London to meet her. However, he has chronic kidney disease, his condition worsens and he dies with Miss Higgins holding his hand. Shelagh is worried when she hears that May's birth mother wishes to make direct contact with her, but ultimately May's mother allows the Turners to adopt her. Joyce's estranged husband is blackmailing her; she reveals her secret, and Sister Julienne allows her to keep her job. Depressed over Matthew's departure, Trixie resorts to caffeine and sleeping pills. Her brother confronts her, and she decides to join Matthew in New York.

=== Series 14 (2025) ===
No. overall	Episode	Directed by	Written by	Original release date	UK viewers (millions)
Special
114	Christmas special	Sarah Esdaile	Heidi Thomas	25 December 2024	7.61
115	Christmas special	Sarah Esdaile	Heidi Thomas	26 December 2024	6.52
It is Christmas 1969 and there is concern about the Hong Kong flu epidemic. After an old woman dies alone from the illness and faces a pauper's funeral, Sister Monica Joan arranges for her body to be brought to Nonnatus House. The dead woman's son, one of two escaped prisoners on the run in Poplar, is shocked to find her flat empty. Trixie and Reggie both return to Poplar for Christmas, but after Fred is delayed picking him up at the coach station, Reggie goes missing. While out searching for Reggie, Rosalind assists an injured man, initially unaware that he is one of the escaped prisoners. After he allows Cyril to bring him in, the nuns arrange for him to attend a service for his mother before he is returned to prison. Dr Turner helps the parents of a baby with severe jaundice, which he attributes to an increasing practice of discharging newborns very quickly. Shelagh endeavours to assist a family who have been evicted and are now living in extreme squalor and facing several health challenges. Reggie is returned safely home. Nancy strikes up a new romance. A meeting between Sister Julienne and the head of the Board of Health suggests a risk to the future of Nonnatus House.
Series
116	Episode 1	Syd Macartney	Heidi Thomas	5 January 2025	7.04
In March 1970, the Nonnatus House staff are caught up in social unrest in the Isle of Dogs area, which causes complications when a mother in labour cannot be taken to hospital. Nancy becomes engaged to her boyfriend Roger and is offered a new job in Surrey, but when Roger's mother visits Poplar, the two women clash. The team support a pregnant 13-year-old girl whose parents hold very strong religious views and believe that their daughter has experienced an immaculate conception. Sister Julienne resolves to stand up to the Board of Health.
117	Episode 2	John Maidens	Katerina Watson	12 January 2025	7.30
Trixie, who is remaining in Poplar while her husband continues to run his business in New York, supports Arlene, an expectant mother who has spent time at a psychiatric institution and has stopped taking her medication, as she fears it may harm her baby. There is concern about an outbreak of gonorrhea in the district, which is traced to a local brothel; one of those affected is the husband of one of the maternity clinic's patients. Attraction grows between Cyril and Rosalind when they volunteer together at a homeless shelter, but he decides to go to Jamaica to reunite with his wife.
118	Episode 3	David Tucker	Chloe Moss	19 January 2025	7.01
Joyce discovers that Nerys, a young widow struggling to cope, has been leaving her three young children alone while going out to work. She also nurses the old man who lives downstairs from Nerys; initially unsociable and curmudgeonly, he later saves Nerys's children when a gas explosion rocks the building. Rosalind's latest patient is Norma, who has done everything she can to be well-prepared, but Norma is devastated when her daughter is born with spina bifida and rejects the baby. Sister Julienne enlists Trixie to speak to the Board of Health, and after a fiery meeting the future of Nonnatus House is secured.
119	Episode 4	David O'Neill	Dana Fainaru and Heidi Thomas	26 January 2025	6.87
A new postulant, Sister Catherine, arrives at the convent. Dr Turner is concerned about falling levels of measles vaccinations; Shelagh endeavours to help a mother whose son was left brain damaged after having measles. Peggy, who already has seven children and has unexpectedly found herself pregnant again, begs Dr Turner to arrange for her to have an abortion, which is now legal but difficult to obtain. After suffering a miscarriage, she opts for sterilisation but dies during the operation.
120	Episode 5	Delyth Thomas	Annalisa Dinnella	2 February 2025	6.63
Sister Veronica discovers that Eva, whose family are living in a disused warehouse, is pregnant. But Eva refuses midwife care, partially due to the influence of her abusive husband. Shelagh assists a man who is in an iron lung, and her concerns for the health of Betty, his wife and carer, lead to the discovery that Betty is dying of cancer. Cyril returns from Jamaica and is drafted to help organise the Poplar version of the Commonwealth Games, which the local children are very excited about. He confides in Mrs. Wallace from his church that Lucille has asked him for a divorce. Sister Julienne is upset by a government report which recommends that all births should take place in hospital rather than at home but is revitalised after delivering Eva's twins in difficult circumstances.
121	Episode 6	Ruth Carney	Nessah Muthy and Heidi Thomas	9 February 2025	6.66
In September 1970, a refuse workers' strike causes an accumulation of rubbish in the streets and concerns about public health. Several people in the neighbourhood, including Reggie, become ill, and an elderly patient of Dr Turner's dies. Rosalind is taken ill and diagnosed with Weil's disease, spread by rats attracted to the rubbish, leaving her critically ill in hospital. Joyce falls foul of Bernie Midgely, a new mother with an aggressive attitude who objects to being treated by a black midwife. When she is hospitalised with a dangerous deep venous thrombosis, after refusing to let Joyce examine her, Mrs Midgely files a complaint, blaming Joyce for her condition. Cyril and a recovering Rosalind address their feelings for each other. Sister Monica Joan helps the cubs with their project on local history.
122	Episode 7	Lisa Clark	Sasha Hails	23 February 2025	7.01
Shelagh, Sister Catherine, and Dr Turner deal with a couple with a history of heroin use. While the husband has succeeded in staying clean, his wife has relapsed, threatening her baby's health. She goes into early labour while undergoing withdrawal. Phyllis shows tough love to a woman who is relying on her son to provide more care for her than she actually needs. The young man wants to join the Army Medical Corps but hesitates to tell his mother of his plans. Sister Catherine is approved to becomes a novice nun. She confides to Sister Monica Joan about her estrangement from her family. The Turners finally adopt May. Joyce is completely exonerated at her disciplinary hearing.
123	Episode 8	Syd Macartney	Heidi Thomas	2 March 2025	6.67
After a fire at a mother and baby home housing unmarried mothers and their infants, four of the residents are moved to Nonnatus House – including Paula, the now-14-year-old girl whose religious parents rejected her earlier in the year. Distressed by what she hears and sees at the maternity home, Paula goes along with Sister Julienne and Rosalind when they accompany Sister Catherine to the mother house for her vows. They are welcomed there by Sister Hilda. Nancy returns to Poplar for her wedding and reveals that she is pregnant. She goes into early labour shortly before the wedding and delivers a healthy baby girl. Sister Catherine is delighted when her sister comes to witness her taking her first vows, but Sister Julienne learns that the future of the entire order is in doubt.

=== Series 15 (2026) ===
No. overall	Episode	Directed by	Written by	Original release date	UK viewers (millions)
Special
124	Christmas special	Syd Macartney	Heidi Thomas	25 December 2025	6.15
125	Christmas special	Syd Macartney	Heidi Thomas	26 December 2025	5.34
In December 1970, Fred and Violet travel to Hong Kong to visit Violet's son; they visit the Order's branch house there just in time to see the building collapse, with significant loss of life. To assist in the crisis, the Turners and several of the senior staff from Nonnatus House travel to the colony. Back in Poplar, Rosalind finds it difficult working with the locum doctor filling in for Dr Turner and brings in Trixie to assist. Joyce attends a difficult birth in an Irish Traveller family. In Hong Kong, Sister Julienne and Sister Hilda rent a new building but it brings them into conflict with a local gangster, who confronts them at gunpoint for the key. Dr Turner and Shelagh seek May’s birth mother, Esther, and find her and her infant son in hiding from the child's gangster father. The child is diagnosed with cancer, and Dr Turner hopes he can take him to England for treatment. He and Fred come face to face with the gangster, who initially refuses to allow them to take the child away but relents when confronted by the police. The nuns are able to find new lodging that was a former training annexe of the police to rent. In London, Cyril allows an elderly man to rent his flat for a couple of weeks for money to help the church then finds that he wanted to return to his place of birth before he dies. He is upset to find that everyone he once knew is dead or gone, but Sister Monica Joan is able to provide him some relief as she remembers birthing his siblings when he was a small child and they are able to reminisce. Sister Catherine helps another expectant mother from the Irish Traveller community, who is scared by her pregnancy because her last child died shortly after birth, while Rosalind and Joyce host a raucous party at Nonnatus House.
Series
126	Episode 1	Lisa Clarke	Heidi Thomas	11 January 2026	6.13
In February 1971, the newly-qualified Sister Catherine deals with Thelma, an expectant mother suffering with hyperemesis gravidarum. When Thelma delivers the baby at just 28 weeks' gestation, the team fight to keep him alive but it leads to questions about whether this is always the best thing to do. Phyllis and Joyce are concerned for the welfare of four children living in squalid conditions; later, information emerges that implicates the parents in the death of one of their other children. The midwives become involved with the women's liberation movement.
127	Episode 2	David Tucker	Annalisa D'Innella and Heidi Thomas	18 January 2026	6.06
A children's Easter egg hunt near Nonnatus House is disrupted when a seemingly rabid dog is discovered nearby, leading to a widespread health scare. Although it proves to be a false alarm, a young man recently returned from travelling in India is found to actually have rabies. An expectant first-time mother is horrified after witnessing her sister-in-law undergoing an extremely traumatic delivery; having been involved with the birth, Trixie encourages Dr Turner to push for an increased offering of epidural anaesthesia. Rosalind introduces Cyril to her parents for the first time but it proves awkward.
128	Episode 3	Delyth Thomas	Katerina Watson	25 January 2026	5.90
Joyce is seconded to St. Cuthbert's Hospital; there she encounters Eileen, a single mother who has been disowned by her aunt, her only relative. Joyce is advised not to form an emotional bond with Eileen, but she does anyway and it ultimately helps save Eileen's life when she needs a blood transfusion. Rosalind deals with a Hungarian woman who has multiple sclerosis; Agata, the woman's cousin, works as her housekeeper but is being kept in domestic slavery and sexually abused. Rosalind convinces Agata to run away and take refuge at a women's hostel, where it is discovered that she is pregnant; later she is finally able to stand up to her relatives.
129	Episode 4	David O'Neill	Carolyn Bonnyman	1 February 2026	6.05
Pam, who has recently separated from her husband, gives birth to a boy. The following morning, the baby has vanished from the maternity home; Sister Catherine, who was on duty, blames herself. Pam's estranged husband is the culprit; the baby has an infection which could leave him blind if he is not found and treated. Dr Turner treats the wife of a friend of Fred; at first she believes she has cancer but it transpires that the cause is a lithopedion, a calcified dead foetus. Christopher, the young child brought from Hong Kong, is to be returned home and Sister Julienne asks Sister Veronica to go with him. Cyril and Rosalind plan a weekend away but she is surprised to learn he has booked separate rooms for them.
130	Episode 5	Sarah Esdaile	Sasha Hails and Heidi Thomas	8 February 2026	6.04
The deadline draws closer by which Sister Julienne must decide whether to accept new NHS regulations, which would mean that the nuns could not wear their religious garments while working with patients; a difficult delivery helps her decide that if the sisters cannot continue to work in a missionary capacity then they will leave Poplar at the end of the year. Dr Turner attends what appears to be a simple house call, but when he makes a second visit, the parents and one of the two children are dead from carbon monoxide poisoning. The mother of the dead man blames Dr Turner of malpractice for his advice to turn up the heating, but it transpires that a faulty boiler was to blame. Cyril faces backlash at his church after his weekend away with Rosalind. There is fresh concern for Sister Monica Joan's health. Returning from Hong Kong, Sister Veronica leaves for a retreat while she contemplates leaving the order due to her desire to have a child.
131	Episode 6	David Tucker	Abigail Wilson and Heidi Thomas	15 February 2026	5.62
Trixie encounters Gwen, a female wrestler who is suffering from a mysterious illness. Eventually it is discovered that she has lupus, which could jeopardise her career and her health. Tests reveal that Sister Monica Joan has chronic kidney disease and does not have long to live. Dr Turner treats Tony, an expectant father who is shocked to learn that he has breast cancer and cannot deal with the stigma of having what is normally a female condition. Rosalind discovers that she is pregnant. The Board of Health announces the decision to close the maternity home.
132	Episode 7	Lisa Clarke	Heidi Thomas	1 March 2026	6.15
In November, as the scheduled closure of the maternity home draws closer, Violet organises a press campaign but Trixie accepts the role of matron at the private Lady Emily Clinic. Cyril and Rosalind get engaged, but a telephone call to her parents to inform them of the news goes badly. Beryl (formerly Sister Veronica) stays with Trixie's brother Geoffrey (Christopher Harper) while contemplating her future. Rhoda Mullucks, whose newborn daughter was affected by the thalidomide drug in 1961, faces a new health challenge; her older daughter Belinda initially refuses to return from university to help out, and when she finally does it is revealed that she is pregnant. While assisting Joyce with a birth as part of his training, Timothy is left to complete the delivery by himself after another medical emergency occurs nearby.
133	Episode 8	Ann Tricklebank	Heidi Thomas	8 March 2026	6.04
Beryl confesses her desire for a child to Trixie but says she has started her menopause so it is too late; ultimately she decides to return to the order. Sister Monica Joan makes plans for her funeral; later she dies after seeing a vision of Sister Evangelina and other past nuns of the order. Rosalind and Cyril marry. Belinda Mullucks gives birth, the last delivery in the maternity home. Sister Monica Joan's funeral takes place. Trixie buys a controlling share in the Lady Emily Clinic. Joyce gets a new hospital job while Phyllis transitions to district nursing. The Turner children hang a sign on the door of Nonnatus House indicating that it is "temporarily closed".
