= Dead Boss =

- Created by: Sharon Horgan; Holly Walsh
- Starring: Sharon Horgan; Jennifer Saunders; Bryony Hannah; Geoffrey McGivern; Tom Goodman-Hill; Lizzie Roper; Aisling Bea; Amanda Lawrence; Edward Hogg; Ricky Champ; Emma Pierson
- Country of origin: United Kingdom
- Original language: English
- No. of series: 1
- No. of episodes: 6

Production
- Executive producers: Jo Sargent; Sharon Horgan
- Producer: Caroline Norris
- Running time: 30 minutes

Original release
- Network: BBC Three
- Release: 14 June – 12 July 2012

Dead Boss is a British sitcom which was shown on BBC Three in 2012.

== Writing ==
The writers, Sharon Horgan and Holly Walsh met through Jo Caulfield, a stand-up comedian who had a show on Radio 4. Horgan and Walsh both worked on the show, Horgan as an actress, and Walsh as a writer. It was Horgan who thought of writing a sitcom based on someone stuck in prison for a crime they did not commit. She asked Walsh if she wanted to work on it with her and the process from conception to broadcast took over two and a half years.

== Cast ==
- Sharon Horgan as Helen Stephens
- Jennifer Saunders as Governor Margaret
- Bryony Hannah as Christine
- Geoffrey McGivern as Tony
- Tom Goodman-Hill as Tim
- Lizzie Roper as Top Dog
- Aisling Bea as Laura Stephens
- Amanda Lawrence as Mary
- Edward Hogg as Henry
- Ricky Champ as Frank
- Emma Pierson as Mrs Elaine Bridges
- Barnaby Kay as Justin
- Susan Calman as Fatty
- Ashley McGuire as Slasher
- Claire Prempeh as Yvonne
- Golda Rosheuvel as Lennie

== Episodes ==
No.	Title	Original release date
1	"Episode one"	14 June 2012
Wrongly convicted and sentenced to 12 years' imprisonment for the murder of her boss Eric Bridges, Helen Stephens arrives at Broadmarsh Prison. She is convinced that it will be only a matter of time before her innocence is shown – only to find that many fellow prisoners take an instant dislike to her.
2	"Episode two"	14 June 2012
Life is made more bearable for Helen when Governor Margaret announces the annual prison quiz – promising prizes of a tin of biscuits, a supersize bottle of conditioner and 5 years off the winner's sentence. Helen is forced into being on Top Dog's team, causing trouble for her friends.
3	"Episode three"	21 June 2012
Christine has been sent to Germany on a prison exchange. Helen is instructed by prison governor Margaret to look after their German guest Gertrude Wermers (Anna Crilly), a cannibal.
4	"Episode four"	28 June 2012
Frustrated with the lack of progress with her appeal, Helen takes matters into her own hands and decides to study the law.
5	"Episode five"	5 July 2012
Governor Margaret announces the annual prison choir competition. Helen is certain to be made lead vocalist until the surprise appearance of Virna (Caroline Quentin).
6	"Episode six"	12 July 2012
Helen is moved to D Wing, much to Christine's dismay, where she is then befriended by forger Jo (Miranda Richardson). Jo reveals that she forged a passport for Eric – after he was supposedly murdered.

The series ended with many unresolved storylines and Helen no nearer to being released. For example, her former fiancé has still not visited her in prison, nor explained his disappearance. We do not know what happened to the winning lottery money, why Helen's boss needed a forged passport, nor who is the owner of the body in the storage locker that we see in the final few minutes of episode 6.

== Reception ==
The series received mixed reviews. It holds a rating of 6.7/10 at the Internet Movie Database.

Terry Ramsey of The Daily Telegraph gave the series a rating of 3.5/5. He stated that "at the start, this looked like another trying-hard-to-be-wacky-without-actually-being-very-funny BBC Three comedy, but by halfway through the first episode it got into its stride, with succinct characterisation, sly humour and a winning main character. On top of the humour there’s a murder mystery developing, plus a fine cameo role by Jennifer Saunders as the prison governor. I watched the second instalment that followed, and really enjoyed it. I can’t stop now, and am desperate for another episode."

Jack Seale of The Radio Times gave the series a negative review, saying "Popular as it now is, this "everyone except the main character is a loon" approach feels like a way to con us out of the 3D creations that are hard to write but keep us coming back. Dead Boss also has an ongoing story arc – again this is in vogue at the expense of giving each episode a tight, resolved plot. You wonder whether this is really because it works better or because writers have lost the knack of setting two or three stories running and then reining them in again 28 minutes later. The story of who really killed Helen's boss is too silly to be believable, but not silly enough for that to stop mattering. Nothing in Dead Boss feels like it actually exists. If a joke falls flat, it's hard to ignore because there's nothing else there. Of course it's possible to do comedy that doesn't have any truth or soul if the jokes are outlandishly good but, despite a superb cast, Dead Boss struggles to reinvent incompetent lawyers, meat-headed screws and disgusting prison food. Horgan and new writing partner Holly Walsh's gags don't have their own fresh voice: episode two had a creaking crack at wordplay involving the phrase "plan B" and the words "you" and "see"; a scene where Helen's absurdly creepy stalker had been masturbating in his office led exactly where you thought it might. Pulling had heart and guts. Dead Boss feels hollow."

Sam Wollaston also gave the show a negative review. She said the show was "pretty lame – and tame [...]. I wanted to like it, but couldn't. So I ignored it. Perhaps it needed time to bed in (pah!), and would get into its stride in week two. I told myself I was giving it a chance by deferring judgment, when of course I was really simply bottling it."

Ket Watson of the Metro gave a negative review, in which he stated that "Dead Boss was enticing enough with its stellar cast, excellent writing credentials and intriguing premise, but in the event, this début episode was more Dead Loss than anything else." He also said that "Throttled by a cast of supporting characters cobbled together from left over bits of Psychoville and Prisoner Cell Block H, Dead Boss boasted bonkers eccentricity by the slop-out bucketload but none of it felt remotely original", and "At the centre of it all there’s Horgan, working her socks off as the 'normal' one. But she’s fighting a losing battle, because the script is a bit of a stinker – and she co-wrote it. This is hard to admit for a Horgan fan but thus far Dead Boss is a bit of a dead loss."
