= Call the Midwife =

BBC period drama TV series by Neal Street Productions (2012–present)

- Genre: Period drama
- Created by: Heidi Thomas
- Based on: Memoirs of Jennifer Worth
- Starring: Current: Jenny Agutter; Helen George; Laura Main; Stephen McGann; Cliff Parisi; Linda Bassett; Annabelle Apsion; Daniel Laurie; Georgie Glen; Zephryn Taitte; Rebecca Gethings; Renee Bailey; Natalie Quarry; Molly Vevers
- Narrated by: Vanessa Redgrave
- Composers: Peter Salem; Maurizio Malagnini
- Country of origin: United Kingdom
- Original language: English
- No. of series: 15
- No. of episodes: 131 (list of episodes)

Production
- Executive producers: Pippa Harris; Heidi Thomas
- Producer: Annie Tricklebank
- Production location: Poplar, London
- Cinematography: Chris Seager
- Running time: 60–90 minutes
- Production company: Neal Street Productions

Original release
- Network: BBC One (United Kingdom); PBS (United States); BBC Series (Spain)
- Release: 15 January 2012 – present

Related
- Call the Midwife: Sisters in Arms

Call the Midwife is a British period drama television series about a group of nurse midwives working in the East End of London in the late 1950s, 1960s and 1970s. The original cast consisted of Jessica Raine, Jenny Agutter, Pam Ferris, Miranda Hart, Judy Parfitt, Helen George, Bryony Hannah, Laura Main, Cliff Parisi and Stephen McGann. Agutter, George, Main, Parisi and McGann are the remaining cast members from the first episode.

The TV series is produced by Neal Street Productions, a production company founded and owned by the film director and producer Sam Mendes, Call the Midwife executive producer Pippa Harris, and Caro Newling. The first series, set in 1957, premiered in the United Kingdom on 15 January 2012. The series was created by Heidi Thomas, originally based on the memoirs of Jennifer Worth who worked with the Community of St. John the Divine, an Anglican religious order, at their convent in the East End in London. The order was founded as a nursing order in 1849. The show's storylines have extended beyond the memoirs to include new, historically-sourced material. For the most part it depicts the day-to-day lives of the midwives and those in their local neighbourhood of Poplar, with certain historical events of the era having a direct or indirect effect on the characters and storylines.

Call the Midwife achieved high ratings in its first series, making it the most successful new drama series on BBC One since 2001. Fourteen additional annual series, of eight episodes each, have aired subsequently year-on-year, along with an annual Christmas special broadcast every Christmas Day since 2012. It is also broadcast in the United States on the PBS network; the first series started on 30 September 2012.

Critical reception has been mostly positive, and the series has won numerous awards and nominations. It has been praised for tackling topical subjects and contemporary social, cultural and economic issues, including nationalised healthcare, the NHS, infertility, teen pregnancy, adoption, the importance of local community, miscarriage and stillbirths, abortion and unwanted pregnancies, birth defects, poverty, common illnesses, epidemic disease, prostitution, incest, religion and faith, racism and prejudice, homosexuality, and female genital mutilation. Some aspects of love—maternal, paternal, filial, fraternal, sisterly, romantic, or the love of friends—are explored in every episode.

== Plot ==
The plot follows newly qualified midwife Jenny Lee, as well as the work of the midwives and the nuns of Nonnatus House, a nursing convent and part of an Anglican religious order, coping with the medical problems in the deprived Poplar district of London's desperately poor East End in the 1950s. The Sisters and midwives carry out many nursing duties across the community. However, with between 80 and 100 babies being born each month in Poplar alone, the primary work is to help bring safe childbirth to women in the area and to look after their countless newborns.

In the first series, which is set in early 1957, the main themes include the "Baby Boom", issues of poverty in the East End, and post-war immigration.

The second series, set in 1958, shows the introduction of gas and air as a form of pain relief, unexploded ordnance, an outbreak of tuberculosis, a baby born with spina bifida and ends with the condemning of the Nonnatus House building.

The third series, set in 1959, depicts cystic fibrosis, polio, caring for the terminally ill and midwifery in a prison context.

In the fourth series, set in 1960, topics covered include the Child Migrants Programme, the threat of nuclear warfare (including emergency response guidelines issued by local Civil Defence Corps), LGBT rights, and syphilis among sex workers.

The fifth series is set in 1961 and shows a patient with typhoid, the effects of thalidomide, the introduction of the contraceptive pill and the impact of strokes.

The sixth series is set in 1962 and touches on domestic violence, an explosion at the local docks, interracial marriage, female genital mutilation, mental health, and introduces Reggie, a recurring character who has Down syndrome.

The seventh series, set in 1963, introduces the first major character of colour, Nurse Lucille Anderson, as well as dementia, racial abuse, Huntington's disease, leprosy and meningitis featuring in storylines.

The eighth series, set in 1964, covers the topic of abortion (which was not legalised until 1967), sickle cell disease, babies born with cleft lip and cleft palate and intersex people.

The ninth series, set in 1965, addresses diphtheria, a blind expectant mother and the continued role and relevance of Nonnatus House in the community.

The tenth series, set in 1966, compares the practice at Nonnatus House with the private Lady Emily Clinic in Mayfair, PKU, diabetes and the controversy of abortion on the eve of legalisation.

The eleventh series, set in 1967, explores addiction and neonatal withdrawal, the 1960s housing crisis, a scabies epidemic, gastroschisis and a train crash next to Nonnatus House.

The twelfth series, set in 1968, discusses political discourse about immigration, the development of the ventouse, schizophrenia, haemophilia, and hepatitis.

The thirteenth series, set in 1969, introduces fertility drugs and higher-order multiple birth, cerebral palsy, porphyria, tetanus, hip dysplasia, retinoblastoma, and the Apollo 11 moon landing.

The fourteenth series, set in 1970, discusses issues relating to the Isle of Dogs fight for independence, single motherhood, and spinal lesions.

The fifteenth series, set in 1971, covers events such as the women's liberation movement and discusses issues relating to lithopaedion, carbon monoxide poisoning and the long-term impact of the thalidomide scandal.

Christmas special episodes also explore conditions such as during a mission to South Africa, an outreach mission to the Outer Hebrides, hosting a Christmas Nativity Scene for the order orphanage of the Order of St Raymond Nonnatus' Mother House, and a rescue mission to Hong Kong after the Order’s Branch House suddenly collapsed and killed or injured many nuns, expectant mothers, and children.

== Cast and characters ==
=== Main cast ===
- Jessica Raine as Nursing Sister Jennifer "Jenny" Lee (series 1–3) and Vanessa Redgrave as Mature Jennifer Worth (narration series 1–present; guest series 4)
- Jenny Agutter as Sister Julienne (series 1 – present)
- Pam Ferris as Sister Evangelina (series 1–5; guest series 15)
- Miranda Hart as Matron Camilla "Chummy" Fortescue-Cholmondeley-Browne (later Noakes; series 1–4)
- Judy Parfitt as Sister Monica Joan (series 1–15)
- Helen George as Nurse Beatrix "Trixie" Franklin (later Lady Aylward; series 1 – present)
- Bryony Hannah as Nurse Cynthia Miller (later Sister Mary Cynthia; series 1–6)
- Laura Main as Nurse Shelagh Turner (formerly Sister Bernadette; series 1 – present)
- Stephen McGann as Dr. Patrick Turner (series 1 – present)
- Cliff Parisi as Fred Buckle (series 1 – present)
- Ben Caplan as Police Constable (later Sergeant) Peter Noakes (series 1–6)
- Emerald Fennell as Nurse Patience "Patsy" Mount (series 3–6; guest series 2)
- Victoria Yeates as Sister Winifred (series 3–8)
- Jack Ashton as Reverend Tom Hereward (series 4–7; recurring series 3)
- Linda Bassett as Nurse Phyllis Crane (series 4 – present)
- Charlotte Ritchie as Nurse Barbara Gilbert (later Hereward; series 4–7)
- Jennifer Kirby as Nurse Valerie Dyer (series 6–9)
- Annabelle Apsion as Violet Gee (later Mayor Buckle; series 7 – present; recurring series 4–6)
- Leonie Elliott as Nurse Lucille Anderson (later Robinson; series 7–12)
- Ella Bruccoleri as Sister Frances (series 8–12)
- Fenella Woolgar as Sister Hilda (series 8–11; guest series 14–15)
- Daniel Laurie as Reginald "Reggie" Jackson (series 10 – present; recurring series 6–9)
- Georgie Glen as Millicent Higgins (series 10 – present; recurring series 8–9)
- Zephryn Taitte as Cyril Robinson (series 10 – present; recurring series 8–9)
- Megan Cusack as Nurse Ann "Nancy" Corrigan (series 10–14)
- Olly Rix as Matthew Aylward (series 10–13)
- Rebecca Gethings as Sister Veronica (series 12 – present)
- Renee Bailey as Nurse Joyce Highland (series 13 – present)
- Natalie Quarry as Nurse Rosalind Clifford (later Robinson) (series 13 – present)
- Molly Vevers as Sister Catherine (series 14 – present)

== Episodes ==
Series	Episodes	Originally released		Avg. UK viewers (millions)
Series	Episodes	First released	Last released	Avg. UK viewers (millions)
1	6	15 January 2012	19 February 2012	10.61
2	Special	25 December 2012		10.47
2	8	20 January 2013	10 March 2013	10.47
3	Special	25 December 2013		10.54
3	8	19 January 2014	9 March 2014	10.54
4	Special	25 December 2014		10.41
4	8	18 January 2015	8 March 2015	10.41
5	Special	25 December 2015		9.95
5	8	17 January 2016	6 March 2016	9.95
6	Special	25 December 2016		10.33
6	8	22 January 2017	12 March 2017	10.33
7	Special	25 December 2017		9.26
7	8	21 January 2018	11 March 2018	9.26
8	Special	25 December 2018		9.04
8	8	13 January 2019	3 March 2019	9.04
9	Special	25 December 2019		8.34
9	8	5 January 2020	23 February 2020	8.34
10	Special	25 December 2020		8.14
10	7	18 April 2021	30 May 2021	8.14
11	Special	25 December 2021		7.64
11	8	2 January 2022	20 February 2022	7.64
12	Special	25 December 2022		6.96
12	8	1 January 2023	26 February 2023	6.96
13	Special	25 December 2023		6.86
13	8	7 January 2024	3 March 2024	6.86
14	Specials	25 December 2024	26 December 2024	6.90
14	8	5 January 2025	2 March 2025	6.90
15	Specials	25 December 2025	26 December 2025	6.00
15	8	11 January 2026	8 March 2026	6.00

== Production ==
=== Locations ===
A number of historic sites in the south of England have been used as filming locations for scenes in Call the Midwife. The ship in the opening titles is the Shaw, Savill & Albion Line liner QSMV Dominion Monarch in dry dock at the King George V Dock and the road is Saville Road, Silvertown, east London.

Many of the exterior scenes are shot at The Historic Dockyard Chatham standing in for East London streets and buildings. In the first two series, Nonnatus House was filmed at St. Joseph's Missionary College in Mill Hill, North London until the building was converted to luxury flats at which point a new Nonnatus House set was created at Longcross Studios in Surrey where sets were built for the new Nonnatus and interior sets. HMS Cavalier is used for scenes on ships during the series and the order's mother house is filmed in West Wittering. A reconstructed prefab house at the Chiltern Open Air Museum in Buckinghamshire has also been used as a filming location.

=== Commissioning ===
The material from Worth's memoirs was substantially adapted in the first two series of Call the Midwife. On 11 February 2013, Ben Stephenson, BBC Controller for Drama, announced that he had commissioned a 2013 Christmas special, and a third series of eight episodes to be broadcast in 2014. Heidi Thomas described how she'd received a specific blessing from Jennifer Worth to continue the series, and had enjoyed a fruitful collaboration on future plans before the author's death. After the departure of Jessica Raine as Jenny Lee at the end of the third series, Jennifer Worth's family stated that Call The Midwife no longer resembled Worth's stories, although her husband acknowledged its continuation would embody the "spirit" of her works. The fourth series aired in the US in 2015, finishing its eight-episode run on 17 May. A Christmas special also aired in 2015.

A fifth series was commissioned for 2016, shortly after series four filming was completed. A sixth series was commissioned, which included a 2016 Christmas episode set in South Africa. On 23 November 2016, the BBC announced a three-year deal with Neal Street Productions, commissioning a seventh, eighth, and ninth series, each with a Christmas special. On 4 March 2019, the BBC announced it had commissioned two further series and Christmas specials, through to an eleventh series in 2022, moving the plot into the late-sixties.

On 13 April 2021—five days before series 10 was due to start broadcasting on BBC One and with the 11th series about to begin filming—the BBC announced that two more series had been commissioned, keeping the show on air until 2024. Series 12 and 13 each comprised eight one-hour episodes as well as a Christmas special. In February 2023, the BBC announced it had commissioned two more series of nine episodes (including Christmas Specials) moving the story into 1971, keeping the show on air until 2026.

=== Soundtrack ===
For the first three series of the programme, the score and the title theme used were composed by Peter Salem; since series four, the music has been composed by Maurizio Malagnini. The orchestral score, mainly comprising strings and piano, accompanies the emotional moments of the series, with Malagnini calling it a diary of the emotions of the series, while more upbeat moments are often accompanied by music appropriate to the setting year. The score was performed by the London Chamber Orchestra.

There have been two albums released with music from the series: a 2012 released Call the Midwife: The Album consisting of period appropriate songs and score tracks from the first series by Salem and a second Call the Midwife: Original Soundtrack Album released in 2018 featuring highlights from Malagnini's score from series 4–7.

== Release ==
=== Broadcast ===
In May 2012, BBC Worldwide and the American Public Broadcasting Service (PBS) announced that the first series of Call the Midwife would premiere in the United States on 30 September 2012. BBC Worldwide also sold the programme to SVT (Sweden); NRK (Norway); RÚV (Iceland); Yle (Finland); AXN White (Spain; Portugal); ERT (Greece); ABC in Australia and TVNZ 1 in New Zealand, where its debut recorded a 35% share of the audience—20% above average. In July 2012, BBC Worldwide announced it sold the global Video on Demand rights of the programme to Netflix, while all episodes are also on BBC iPlayer in the UK.

The second series of Call the Midwife was sold to PBS for transmission from 31 March 2013 and to SVT (Sweden) for transmission from 19 May 2013. In February 2013, BBC Worldwide reported that Call the Midwife had been sold in over one hundred global territories, with global sales contributing to the UK's position as the second largest TV exporter behind the United States. In February 2017, it was reported that the BBC had exported Call the Midwife to 237 global territories.

A second series of eight episodes aired in the UK in early 2013. The series achieved a consolidated series average of 10.47 million viewers. A third eight-part series aired in the UK from January 2014, with a consolidated average of 10.53 million.

On 28 February 2014, BBC confirmed that Call the Midwife had been commissioned for a 2014 Christmas special and fourth series, to air in 2015. On 3 November 2014, BBC announced that an eight-episode fifth series had been commissioned; it began airing on 17 January 2016; the fifth series takes the story into 1961. The sixth series began airing in the UK on 22 January 2017, taking the drama into 1962. Series seven, again consisting of eight episodes, began airing on Sunday, 21 January 2018, with episode one viewed by 9.87 million viewers. It was the No.1 rated programme on UK TV for all weeks of its transmission, ending 11 March 2018. The eighth series premiered on 13 January 2019.

=== Home media ===
The first series was released in a Region 2, two-disc DVD set on 12 March 2012. Series two was released on 1 April 2013 in the UK (region 2) with a collector's edition, Call the Midwife Collection, containing series one, two, and the 2012 Christmas Special, released on the same date.

In the United States, the first series was released on DVD and Blu-ray on 6 November 2012. Series two was released on DVD and Blu-ray on 18 June 2013. Series three was released on Blu-ray on 20 May 2014. Series four was released on Blu-ray on 19 May 2015.

== Film ==
In May 2025, the BBC announced that a Call the Midwife feature film is in development. The film will be set in 1972, the calendar year following the events of series 15, and will feature characters from the existing television series. Details about the plot and cast have not been fully revealed, but it is confirmed that "iconic characters from the existing TV show" will appear.

== Prequel series ==
In June 2026, it was confirmed that a three part prequel series called Call the Midwife: Sisters in Arms had commenced filming with a release date of Christmas 2026. Jenny Agutter will narrate as the older Sister Julienne while a younger version of the character will appear in the series. It was also announced that a full length series was in development.. The prequel will explore the lives of midwives in Poplar during The Blitz in the Second World War. According to Heidi Thomas, the series will feature the younger versions of Sister Monica Joan (Judy Parfitt), Sister Julienne (Jenny Agutter) and Sister Evangelina (Pam Ferris).

== Reception ==
=== Critical response ===
A second series was immediately commissioned after the opening episode attracted an audience of nearly 10 million viewers. The second episode increased its audience to 10.47 million, while the third continued the climb to 10.66. Episode four's rating reached 10.89 million.

In the United States, the series one transmission on PBS drew an average household audience rating of 2.1, translating into three million viewers—50 per cent above PBS's primetime average for the 2011–12 series. The autumn 2012 PBS broadcast of the first series received widespread critical acclaim, earning a Metacritic score of 8.0. The Wall Street Journal declared that "this immensely absorbing drama is worth any trouble it takes to catch up with its singular pleasures", while The Washington Post stated that "the cast is marvelous, the gritty, post-war set pieces are meticulously recreated". TV Guide called the series "a delight to watch", while the San Francisco Chronicle described it as "sentimental, poignant and often heartbreaking". Maane Khatchatourian of Entertainment Weekly wrote, "Just what the doctor ordered."

The second series opened with a record overnight audience of 9.3 million UK viewers, going on to achieve a consolidated series average of 10.47 million viewers. This was almost 2 million above the slot average, and by some distance the most popular UK drama in every week of transmission. When viewing figures from BBC's iPlayer video streaming service and a narrative repeat were included as part of the BBC Live Plus 7 metric, the total number of viewers per week was found to be almost 12 million.

Caitlin Moran in The Times called this "an iron hand in a velvet glove", while Allison Pearson in The Daily Telegraph lauded its ability to "tickle the middle of the brow while touching the most anguished parts of the human condition". In particular, commentators have noted the attention given to female social issues in the drama's post-war, pre-pill setting. Alison Graham in the Radio Times dubbed Call the Midwife "a magnificently subversive drama" and "the torchbearer of feminism on television," while Caitlin Moran claimed the series encapsulated "how unbelievably terrifying, dreary and vile it was to be a working-class woman 60 years ago."

In October 2023, a group of academics suggested that the show should come with a health warning due to the depiction of 'inaccurate' birthing practices. The production responded that the series was a period drama, not a documentary, and "highly accurate to the time it depicts".

=== Accolades ===
Year	Award	Category	Recipient	Result
2012	British Academy Television Craft Awards	Best Costume Design	Amy Roberts	Nominated
2012	British Academy Television Awards	Best Supporting Actress	Miranda Hart	Nominated
2012	Prix Europa	Best Episode of a TV Fiction Series or Serial	Call the Midwife	Nominated
2012	Prix Europa	TV Fiction	Call the Midwife	Nominated
2012	TV Choice Awards, UK	Best Actress	Miranda Hart	Won
2012	TV Choice Awards, UK	Best New Drama	Call the Midwife	Won
2012	Royal Television Society Craft & Design Awards	Costume Design – Drama	Amy Roberts	Nominated
2013	National Television Awards	Drama Performance: Female	Miranda Hart	Won
2013	TV and Radio Industries Club Award	Drama Programme of the Year	Call the Midwife	Won
2013	Royal Television Society Programme Awards	Best Drama Series	Call the Midwife	Nominated
2013	Royal Television Society Craft & Design Awards	Make Up – Drama	Christine Walmesley-Cotham	Nominated
2013	Christopher Award	TV and Cable Prize	Call the Midwife	Won
2013	British Academy Television Craft Awards	Director – Fiction	Philippa Lowthorpe	Won
2013	British Academy Television Craft Awards	Make up and Hair Design	Christine Walmesley-Cotham	Won
2013	British Academy Television Awards	Audience award	Call the Midwife	Nominated
2013	TV Choice Awards, UK	Best Actress	Miranda Hart	Won
2013	TV Choice Awards, UK	Best Drama Series	Call the Midwife	Nominated
2014	National Television Awards	Drama Performance: Female	Miranda Hart	Nominated
2014	National Television Awards	Best Drama	Call the Midwife	Nominated
2014	Satellite Award	Best Actress in a Supporting Role in a Series, Mini-Series or Motion Picture Made for Television	Judy Parfitt	Nominated
2014	TV and Radio Industries Club Award	Drama Programme of the Year	Call the Midwife	Nominated
2015	TV Choice Awards, UK	Best Family Drama	Call the Midwife	Won
2016	Sandford St Martin Trust Awards	Radio Times Faith Award	Call the Midwife	Won
2016	TV Choice Awards, UK	Best Family Drama	Call the Midwife	Won
2017	National Television Awards	Best Period Drama	Call the Midwife	Won
2017	Gracie Awards, US	Television – Ensemble Cast	Call the Midwife	Won
2017	BFI & Radio Times TV Festival	Best 21st Century TV Drama	Call the Midwife	Won
2017	TV Choice Awards, UK	Best Family Drama	Call the Midwife	Won
2018	National Television Awards	Best Drama	Call the Midwife	Nominated
2018	TV and Radio Industries Club Award	Drama Programme of the Year	Call the Midwife	Nominated
2018	TV Choice Awards, UK	Best Family Drama	Call the Midwife	Won
2018	TV Choice Awards, UK	Best Actress	Linda Bassett	Nominated
2019	National Television Awards	Best Drama	Call the Midwife	Nominated
2019	TV and Radio Industries Club Award	Drama Programme of the Year	Call the Midwife	Nominated
2019	American Society of Composers, Authors and Publishers Screen Music Awards	Top Cable Television Series Music	Maurizio Malagnini – Call the Midwife	Won
2019	TV Choice Awards, UK	Best Family Drama	Call the Midwife	Won
2020	National Television Awards	Best Drama	Call the Midwife	Nominated
2020	TV Choice Awards, UK	Best Actor	Stephen McGann	Nominated
2020	TV Choice Awards, UK	Best Family Drama	Call the Midwife	Won
2021	TV Choice Awards, UK	Best Family Drama	Call the Midwife	Won
2021	National Television Awards	Best Returning Drama	Call the Midwife	Nominated
2021	American Society of Composers, Authors and Publishers Screen Music Awards	Top Rated Television Series Music	Maurizio Malagnini – Call the Midwife	Won
2021	TV and Radio Industries Club Award	Drama Programme	Call the Midwife	Nominated
2022	radiotimes.com, UK	Best TV show of the past 25 years	Call the Midwife	Won
2022	National Television Awards	Best Returning Drama	Call the Midwife	Nominated
2022	TV Choice Awards, UK	Best Family Drama	Call the Midwife	Won
2022	TV Choice Awards, UK	Best Actress	Jenny Agutter	Won
2022	TV Choice Awards, UK	Best Actor	Daniel Laurie	Nominated
2023	National Television Awards	Best Returning Drama	Call the Midwife	Nominated
2023	TV Choice Awards, UK	Best Family Drama	Call the Midwife	Won
2023	TV Choice Awards, UK	Best Actress	Jenny Agutter	Nominated
2024	British Association of Social Workers Awards 2024	Drama Category	Call the Midwife	Won
2024	National Television Awards	Best Returning Drama	Call the Midwife	Nominated
2024	TV Choice Awards, UK	Best Family Drama	Call the Midwife	Won
2025	TV and Radio Industries Club Award	Drama Category	Call the Midwife	Won
2025	TV Choice Awards, UK	Best Family Drama	Call the Midwife	Won
2025	National Television Awards	Returning Drama	Call the Midwife	Won
2025	TV Times Awards	Favourite Returning Drama	Call the Midwife	Won
2026	TV and Radio Industries Club Award	Drama Category	Call the Midwife	Nominated
2026	National Television Awards	Returning Drama	Call the Midwife	Won
