= Bryony Hannah =

British actress

Bryony Shona Hannah
- Education: Royal Academy of Dramatic Art (RADA)
- Occupation: Actress
- Television: Call the Midwife; Dead Boss
- Children: 1

Bryony Hannah is a British actress, best known as Cynthia Miller in BBC One's Call the Midwife.

== Early life ==
The daughter of a teacher and a retired Royal Navy lieutenant-commander, Hannah comes from Portsmouth, and after leaving school worked in a pub in Southampton. She was then accepted to RADA, having won a Laurence Olivier Bursary.

== Career ==
Hannah received an Laurence Olivier Award for Best Performance in a Supporting Role for her role as Mary Tilford in The Children's Hour. Several reviews of that production mentioned that Hannah was a "virtual unknown" and "stole the show."

Her other stage roles include performances in Earthquakes in London, Every Good Boy Deserves Favour, The Pillowman, The Merry Wives of Windsor and War Horse. In 2017, she appeared in the posthumous premiere of Olivier Award winner Kevin Elyot's final play Twilight Song, alongside Adam Garcia and Paul Higgins.

She also appeared in Dead Boss as Christine and provided the voice of Padget, Pando's carer, in the CBeebies TV series Bing.

She is best known for her work on Call the Midwife. Her character, Nurse Cynthia Miller, was in the initial cast of characters of season one. During the course of the show, Cynthia decided she was being called to a religious life, and she became a nun. Her character lived as a nun at Nonnatus House, where she also worked as a midwife. Hannah left the series after season six.

== Personal life ==
In 2014, Hannah gave birth to her first child.

== Filmography ==
Film
Year	Title	Role	Notes
2010	Cemetery Junction	Louise the Waitress	
2015	Jupiter Ascending	Nurse Schultz	
2021	The Last Duel	Alice	
2023	Firebrand	Ellen	
Television
Year	Title	Role	Notes
2003	Reversals	Female Student	Minor role, TV movie
2011	Life's Too Short	Brenda	1 episode
2012	Above Suspicion	Felicity Turner	Series 4: "Silent Scream"
2012–2017	Call the Midwife	Cynthia Miller / Sister Mary Cynthia	Main cast, series 1-6
2012	Dead Boss	Christine	6 episodes
2014-2019	Bing	Padget	Recurring role
2017	Unforgotten	Cath	4 episodes
2021	Death in Paradise	Rebecca Morley	1 episode
2022	The Chelsea Detective	Erin Murphy	1 episode
2024	Rivals	Deirdre Kilpatrick	Main role
2025	Talamasca: The Secret Order	Ridge	4 episodes
TBA	The Detection Club	Agatha Christie	Upcoming ten-part detective drama
Theatre
Year	Title	Role	Notes
2012	The Children's Hour	Mary Tilford	Olivier Award Nomination for Best Actress in a Supporting Role
