= Laura Main =

British actress (born 1977)

- Born: 8 March 1977 (age 49); Aberdeen, Scotland
- Education: University of Aberdeen, MA History of Art, 1998
- Occupation: Actress
- Years active: 1990–present
- Notable work: Call the Midwife
- Height: 157 cm (5 ft 2 in)
- Partner: Stephen McGlynn (2012-2017)
- Parents: Robert Main (father); Lorna (mother)
- Relatives: Rona (sister) Julia (sister)

Laura Main (born 8 March 1977) is a Scottish actress known for her role as Sister Bernadette and, later, Nurse Shelagh Turner in the BBC One drama series Call the Midwife.

== Early life and education ==
Laura Main was born in Aberdeen in 1977. Her father, Robert, was a fish merchant and her mother, Lorna, was a primary school teacher turned housewife. She has two older sisters, a niece, and two nephews.

Laura Main went to school at the Hazlehead Academy and took dance lessons at the Danscentre in Aberdeen. She then studied history at the University of Aberdeen, gaining an MA History of Art in 1998 before starting drama school at the Webber Douglas Academy of Dramatic Art in London.

== Career ==
Main started performing in musical theatre at the age of 13 when she landed the role of Annie with Phoenix Youth Theatre. At age 15 she debuted in the role of Louisa von Trapp in a stage production of The Sound of Music. At university she performed as part of the musical society Treading the Boards in Aberdeen. She has performed on stage in several productions with the Royal Shakespeare Company. In 2011 she appeared in the Stephen Sondheim musical Company.

In 2011 she was cast as Sister Bernadette in the hit BBC series Call the Midwife. Main features as a soloist in several tracks on the Call the Midwife album released in February 2013. In November 2015 Main won the Children in Need Strictly Come Dancing special with dancer Brendan Cole.

In 2017, Main was cast in the lead role of Princess Fiona, in the second UK tour of Shrek The Musical. Main shared the role with The X Factor contestant Amelia Lily. Main's first performance was on 12 December 2017, at the Edinburgh Playhouse.

From January 2023, Main starred as M'lynn in a production of Steel Magnolias at the Richmond Theatre, London. Main appeared alongside Lucy Speed, Diana Vickers, Caroline Harker and Elizabeth Ayodele. The production, going on to tour the UK, was rated 2/5 stars by What's on Stage.

In February 2024, Main was scheduled to star in Chris Chibnall’s new play, One Last Push, at Salisbury Playhouse.

== Filmography ==
Year	Film/TV	Role	Notes
2002	Is Harry on the Boat?	Rival Club Rep	TV series (1 episode)
2003	The Forsyte Saga: To Let	Mary McKenzie	TV mini-series (1 episode)
2003	Trevor's World of Sport	Nurse	TV series (2 episodes)
2004	Monarch of the Glen	Jaynie Cresswell	TV series (1 episode: #6.4)
2004	Murder City	DC Alison Bain	TV series (10 episodes, 2004–2006)
2007	Holby City	Julia Mason	TV series (1 episode: "After the Fall")
2010	The Invisible Atomic Monsters from Mars	Beth	Film
2010	Rob and Valentyna in Scotland	Waitress in Pub	Short
2011	Holby City	Deirdre Hunter	TV series (1 episode: "What You Mean by Home")
2011	Doctors	Amanda Luckhurst	TV series (1 episode: "Lasso the Moon")
2012–present	Call the Midwife	Sister Bernadette (Nun); Nursing Sister Shelagh Turner (Nurse)	TV series (101 episodes)
2013	Dead Cat	Etta	Film
2014	The Mill	Rebecca Howlett	TV series (Series 2: 6 episodes)
2014	Father Brown	Dorothy Underwood	TV series (1 episode: "The Maddest of All")
2016	Doctors	Kate Wilkinson	TV series (1 episode: "Living Together")
2022	Roots & Fruits	Pak Choi (voice)	TV series (26 episodes) Children's animation

== Theatre ==
Year	Play title	Role	Notes
1990	Annie	Annie	Aberdeen Arts Centre
1992	The Sound of Music	Louisa von Trapp	His Majesty's Theatre Aberdeen
1996	Aberdeen Student Show: The Good, the Bad and the Buttery		His Majesty's Theatre Aberdeen
1997	Aberdeen Student Show: Scaffie Society	Judy Free	His Majesty's Theatre Aberdeen
1998	Aberdeen Student Show: From Rubislaw with Love	Shauna Connery	His Majesty's Theatre Aberdeen
2001	Company	Amy	Aberdeen Arts Centre
2001	Alice in Wonderland	Edith/Eaglet (understudy Alice)	Royal Shakespeare Company
2002	As You Like It	Phebe, a shepherdess	Regents Park Open Air Theatre
2002	Romeo and Juliet	Juliet	Regents Park Open Air Theatre
2006	Young Woodley	Maude	Finborough Theatre
2006	Tea and Sympathy	Laura Reynolds	Finborough Theatre
2007	All I Want For Christmas	Irina Vanevskaya	Upstairs at the Gatehouse
2008	On the Island of Aars	Morag McMac	Pleasance Islington and Pleasance Courtyard, Edinburgh
2009	State Fair	Margy Frake	Finborough Theatre
2009	Super Alice Smith	Carly	Trafalgar Studios
2010	State Fair	Margy Frake	Trafalgar Studios
2010	Me and Juliet	Jeanie	Finborough Theatre
2011	Company	Susan	Southwark Playhouse
2012	Robin Hood	Maid Marian	Queen's Theatre Barnstaple
2013	The Lost Dragon		Harlow Playhouse
2018	Shrek the Musical	Princess Fiona	UK tour
2019	Cinderella	Fairy Godmother	His Majesty's Theatre Aberdeen
2023	Steel Magnolias	M'Lynn Eatenton	2023 UK & Ireland Tour
2024	One Last Push	Jen	Salisbury Playhouse
