= Jennifer Kirby =

English stage and television actress

- Born: Jennifer Ann Kirby; 18 August 1988 (age 37); Milton Keynes, Buckinghamshire, England
- Education: Malvern St James
- Alma mater: LAMDA; University of East Anglia (BA, 2010)
- Occupation: Actress
- Years active: 2013–present

Jennifer Ann Kirby (born 18 August 1988) is an English television and stage actress. She is best known for her role as Nurse Valerie Dyer on the BBC One period drama Call the Midwife. She joined the show in series six and played Valerie until the conclusion of the ninth series. She is a member of the Royal Shakespeare Company.

== Early life and education ==
Kirby was born in Milton Keynes, Buckinghamshire, and has a younger sister, Eleanor, born in 1993. She came from a family without any acting history; her mother (née Coulson) is a teacher and her father a businessman.

Kirby attended Malvern St James Girls School in Malvern Hills. She decided to become an actress as a teenager. She read English Literature and Drama at the University of East Anglia, graduating in 2010, before spending two years at the London Academy of Music and Dramatic Art.

== Career ==
Kirby's first major role was as Elizabeth Bennet in Pride and Prejudice at Regent's Park Open Air Theatre in London, for which she was nominated for Outstanding Newcomer at the 2013 Evening Standard Theatre Awards and was longlisted for London Newcomer of the Year at the 2014 WhatsOnStage Awards.

Her other stage work includes leading roles in Teddy at Southwark Playhouse and The Recruiting Officer at the Salisbury Playhouse. She received a Commendation at the Ian Charleson Awards for her 2014 role as Lady Percy in Henry IV, Parts 1 and 2 at the Royal Shakespeare Company, and for the RSC she was also Katherine in Henry V.

She made her television debut in an episode of the long-running BBC One medical drama Holby City in 2015, before being cast as ex-Army nurse Valerie Dyer in series six of Call the Midwife, debuting in 2017. In 2020, she confirmed that she had left her role on Call the Midwife after four years. In 2021, she appeared as Dr. Gillian Nicholls in episode 3 of season 8 of the detective drama series Endeavour.

In summer 2023 Kirby will perform in Kimber Lee's untitled f*ck m*ss s**gon play, at the Royal Exchange, Manchester and Young Vic in London.
