= List of Call the Midwife characters =

The following is a list of characters from Call the Midwife, a British television period-drama series shown on BBC One since 2012.

== Cast ==
Character name	Role	Actor	Series														
Character name	Role	Actor	1	2	3	4	5	6	7	8	9	10	11	12	13	14	15
Jenny Lee	Nurse, midwife	Jessica Raine	Main														
Chummy Noakes (Camilla Browne)	Nurse, midwife	Miranda Hart	Main			Recurring											
Sister Julienne (Louise)	Sister-in-charge, nurse, midwife	Jenny Agutter	Main														
Sister Monica Joan (Antonia Keville)	Retired nurse, midwife	Judy Parfitt	Main														
Sister Evangelina (Enid Atwood)	Nurse, midwife	Pam Ferris	Main				Recurring										Guest
Sister Mary Cynthia (Cynthia Miller)	Nurse, midwife	Bryony Hannah	Main					Recurring									
Beatrix "Trixie" Aylward (nurse); Beatrix, Lady Aylward (official title) (Beatrix "Trixie" Franklin)	Nursing Sister, midwife	Helen George	Main														
Shelagh Turner (Sister Bernadette)	Sister and practice manager, practice midwife, Senior midwife (Nonnatus House) (Series 6–)	Laura Main	Main														
Patrick Turner	General practitioner	Stephen McGann	Main														
Frederick "Fred" Buckle	Caretaker, shopkeeper	Cliff Parisi	Main														
Peter Noakes	Police Sergeant	Ben Caplan	Main				Recurring	Guest									
Voice of Jennifer Worth	Nurse, midwife	Vanessa Redgrave	Main														
Timothy "Tim" Turner	Patrick Turner's son, Specialist Registrar & GP Registrar	Max Macmillan		Recurring	Main							Recurring					Recurring
Patience "Patsy" Mount	Nurse, midwife	Emerald Fennell		Guest	Main												
Sister Winifred	Midwife	Victoria Yeates			Main					Guest							
Tom Hereward	Curate	Jack Ashton			Recurring	Main			Recurring								
Barbara Hereward (nee. Gilbert)	Nurse, midwife	Charlotte Ritchie				Main			Recurring								
Phyllis Crane	Deputy (medical) Sister-in-charge, Senior Nurse, midwife	Linda Bassett				Main											
Violet Buckle	Haberdasher, wife of Fred Buckle, (Series 4-), Member of the Tower Hamlets Borough Council (Series 9-)	Annabelle Apsion				Recurring			Main								
Delia Busby	Nurse	Kate Lamb				Recurring	Main										
Christopher Dockerill	Dentist	Jack Hawkins						Main									
Valerie Dyer	Nurse, midwife	Jennifer Kirby						Main									
Reggie Jackson	Fred and Violet Buckle's ward	Daniel Laurie						Guest	Recurring			Main					
Lucille Robinson	Nurse, midwife	Leonie Elliott							Main					Recurring			
Sister Hilda	Midwife, nun	Fenella Woolgar								Main						Guest	
Sister Frances	Midwife, nun	Ella Bruccoleri								Main				Guest			
Cyril Robinson	Pastor and social worker	Zephryn Taitte								Recurring		Main					
Millicent Higgins	Surgery secretary	Georgie Glen								Recurring		Main					
Matthew, Lord Aylward	Patient widower	Olly Rix										Main					
Ann "Nancy" Noble (nee. Corrigan)	Pupil Midwife (Series 10); nurse, midwife	Megan Cusack										Recurring	Main			Recurring	
Sister Veronica	Nun, health visitor, nurse, midwife	Rebecca Gethings												Main			
Joyce Highland	Pupil Midwife (Series 13); Midwife	Renee Bailey													Main		
Rosalind Robinson (nee. Clifford)	Pupil Midwife (Series 13); Midwife	Natalie Quarry													Main		
Sister Catherine Cantwell	Pediatric nurse, Postulant and pupil midwife	Molly Vevers														Main	
James "Jimmy" Wilson	Friend of Jenny Lee	George Rainsford	Recurring														
Lady Browne	Chummy's mother	Cheryl Campbell	Guest		Guest												
Jack Smith	Senior Scout	Jake Bailey	Guest	Recurring		Guest											
Jane Sutton	Medical orderly	Dorothy Atkinson		Recurring													
Alec Jesmond	Boyfriend of Jenny Lee	Leo Staar		Guest	Recurring												
Angela Turner	Daughter of Shelagh and Patrick Turner	Alice Brown				Recurring											
Freddie Noakes	Son of Chummy and Peter Noakes	Liam Kiff				Recurring											
Mrs Busby	Delia Busby's mother	Maxine Evans				Guest	Recurring										
Miss Dawkins	Head teacher	Kate Copeland				Guest											
Mr. Kenley	St. Cuthbert's physician	Gerrard McArthur					Guest	Recurring		Guest		Guest					
Aunt Flo	Valerie Dyer's aunt	Nicky Goldie					Guest		Guest	Recurring	Guest						
Rhoda Mullucks	Susan Mullucks's mother	Liz White					Guest							Guest			Guest
Bernie Mullucks	Susan Mullucks's father	Chris Reilly					Guest							Guest			Guest
Sister Ursula	Sister-in-charge, midwife, nurse	Harriet Walter						Recurring									
Alexandra Dockerill	Daughter of Christopher Dockerill	Tipper Seifert-Cleveland						Guest	Recurring								
Sergeant Aubrey Woolf	Police Sergeant	Trevor Cooper							Recurring		Guest						
Mother Mildred	Mother Superior	Miriam Margolyes								Recurring	Guest	(Note: Was absent due to Covid)	Guest				
May Turner (née Tang)	Foster then Adopted child of Shelagh and Patrick Turner	April Rae Hoang								Recurring							
Elsie Dyer	Relative of Valerie Dyer	Ann Mitchell								Recurring	Guest						
Maureen Bryant	Cousin of Valerie Dyer	Juliet Oldfield								Guest							
Miss Graham	School teacher	Emilia Williams									Recurring		Guest				
Miss Williams	Adopting agency social worker	Charlotte Lucas									Guest				Guest		
Kevin McNulty	Dr. Turner's assistant	Lee Armstrong									Recurring						
Yennis Cheung	May Turner's biological mother	Esther Tang									Guest						Guest
Mrs. Wallace	Church lady	Linda Hargreaves										Recurring					
Teddy Turner	Son of Shelagh and Patrick Turner	Edward Shaw										Recurring					
Colette Noble (Corrigan)	Daughter of Nancy Corrigan, step-daughter of Roger Noble	Francesca Fullilove										Guest	Recurring				
Alison Hopkiss	Pupil Midwife	Rebecca Tebbett										Recurring					
Georgette Bains	Pupil Midwife	Karene Peter										Recurring					
Janice Cowan	Pupil Midwife	Scarlett Courtney										Recurring					
Mr. Scarisbrick	Patronising administrator of the Lady Emily Clinic	Richard Dillane										Guest					Guest
Jonathan Jonty Aylward	Son of Matthew, Lord Aylward, Step-son of Trixie, Lady Aylward	Archie O'Callaghan												Recurring			
Geoffrey Franklin	Brother of Trixie	Christopher Harper												Guest		Recurring	
Dr. Threapwood	The chairman of the London Board of Health	Timothy Harker												Guest		Recurring	
Susan Mullucks	"Thalidomide child"	Emily Webb												Guest			Guest
Belinda Mullucks	Susan Mullucks's sister	Rachel Andrews												Guest			Guest
Norelle Morris	Pupil Midwife	Shamia Phills													Recurring		
Kathy Downes	Pupil Midwife	Rachel Nicholson													Recurring		
Mr. Parry	St. Cuthbert's gynaecologist	Paul Bigley													Guest		Recurring
Harry Chopra	Miss Higgins's grandson; Specialist Registrar (Dentistry)	Eisa Latif													Guest		Recurring
Roger Noble	Pharmaceutical salesman	Conor O'Donnell														Recurring	
Mr. Hawley	Radio Reporter	John Addison														Guest	
Christopher Tang	May Turner's biological half-brother	Max Ho															Recurring

== Characters ==
Sister Julienne
- Call The Midwife character
- Portrayed by: Jenny Agutter
- Duration: 2012–
- First appearance: Series 1, Episode 1
- Introduced by: Jennifer Worth
In-universe information
- Other names: Louise
- Occupation: Sister-in-charge, nun, midwife and nurse

=== Sister Julienne ===
Sister Julienne, the sister-in-charge of Nonnatus House, manages both her charges and fellow sisters with a combination of tact, compassion, and no-nonsense advice. Her steadfast, compassionate guidance makes her an anchor for her colleagues, and the centre of organisation, offering comfort and help to the young midwives. She has a notably close, warm and maternal relationship with Sister Bernadette, serving as her chief mentor and confidante. Beginning with Series 4, it becomes clear that the weight of always having to be "the wise one" takes a heavier toll on her than many would guess, and she is increasingly shown leaning on Shelagh (formerly Sister Bernadette) for counsel and support; nevertheless, her faith is not shaken and she remains a serene, guiding presence for all of Nonnatus House. Her pre-order name was Louise.

In Series 6, after her return from Africa, Sister Julienne becomes deputy sister-in-charge to Sister Ursula. Sister Ursula leaves in the third episode, and Sister Julienne becomes sister-in-charge again.

In Series 11, Sister Julienne is involved in a train crash. She suffers broken ribs and is suspected to have had a heart attack in the aftermath, but further testing confirms it was only shock.

=== Sister Monica Joan ===
Sister Monica Joan
- Call The Midwife character
- Portrayed by: Judy Parfitt
- Duration: 2012–2026
- First appearance: Series 1, Episode 1
- Introduced by: Jennifer Worth
In-universe information
- Occupation: Nun, retired midwife and nurse

One of the UK's earliest registered nurses, and the last surviving founder of Nonnatus House, Sister Monica Joan (whose birth name was Antonia Keville, born 1872) retired from practice prior to the events of the series. She is suffering from the early stages of dementia as well as being frail in body. Desperate to be of service and feel useful, she is given make-work tasks to keep her occupied, such as rolling bandages (which the nurses secretly unrolled beforehand). Sister Julienne expresses that it is now their privilege to care for her.

It is never entirely clear how much of Sister Monica Joan's eccentricity is due to the frailty of age, or (as Jenny and Sister Bernadette suspect) sheer willful naughtiness. She has a habit of devouring all the sweets at Nonnatus House, leading everyone to try to hide them from her. She also knits woollen teddy bears and casts her horoscope in the stars and planets in order to tell her future. It is evident that Sister Monica Joan is well-educated and well-read, as she frequently quotes a wide range of authors from Greek philosophers and Freud, to Keats and Shakespeare. She treasures her personal collection of books, even as her eyesight begins to fail.

In the final episode of Series 1, after recovering from pneumonia, she is arrested for stealing trinkets from the market: some ribbons, a handkerchief, a china robin and several other things. Later, she is suspected of stealing a ring, a bracelet and a pearl necklace, which were discovered by Jenny Lee. Sister Monica Joan then went to hide them in her knitting bag and they were found by Sister Evangelina and Sister Julienne, who called the police. Sister Monica Joan is then put on trial, and Mother Jesu Emanuel (Mother Superior of the order) testifies that Sister Monica Joan inherited those items from her mother and no crime was committed. In light of Monica Joan's age and moments of forgetfulness, she is acquitted of the trinket thefts.

In Series 2, she reconciles with her nephew and his family, fears that she is useless, spends a lot of money on taxis to see her nephew, much to the chagrin of Sister Julienne, recovers from angina, escapes a holiday with Sister Evangelina to Chichester, judges a baby show, and pays for a child's funeral. Sister Monica Joan is very close to and gets on well with Jenny. In the 2015 Christmas special, she runs away from the convent after an argument with Sister Evangelina, returning to her childhood home with the belief that everyone should go back to their home, prompted by Barbara's comment that she was not allowed back to Liverpool for Christmas. She returns just in time for their appearance on the BBC.

In Series 12, Sister Monica Joan assists at the maternity home during a gastroenteritis outbreak despite concerns about her age. She insists her age and wisdom are beneficial, not a complication.

While Nancy Corrigan is working at Nonnatus House, her daughter Colette grows close to Sister Monica Joan. When painting a picture of someone inspirational, Colette finds that Sister Monica Joan is hiding a dog called "Nothing".

=== Beatrix "Trixie" Aylward (née Franklin) ===
Beatrix "Trixie", Lady Aylward
- Call The Midwife character
- Portrayed by: Helen George
- Duration: 2012–
- First appearance: Series 1, Episode 1
- Introduced by: Jennifer Worth
In-universe information
- Occupation: Nursing Sister, midwife and nurse
- Brothers: Geoffrey Franklin
- Husband: Matthew Aylward (1968–
- Stepsons: Johnathan "Jonty" Aylward

Trixie has a much more outgoing disposition than Jenny, but the two share the sense of adventure in their work and become firm friends. Trixie loves nothing more than gossiping with her colleagues and is quite nosey when it comes to other people's business.

She occasionally comes across as a bit rude, but she means no harm by it. When it comes to her friends, she takes great pleasure in teasing them about what is going on in their lives. She is caring but no-nonsense to her patients and is encouraging at hopeless times. She is light and carefree, jokes a lot, tries to set her colleagues up with boys and is generally a little boy-mad. Nevertheless, it is clear that work is first in her life, until Curate Tom Hereward proposes to her and she accepts. But their engagement breaks down when Trixie discovers that Tom has a placement in a slum in Newcastle, an industrial city in North East England. This makes her turn even more to alcohol for comfort, but after struggling with alcoholism, with Cynthia's help, she joins a support group. Over time, she shares a room with many of the other midwives including Jenny Lee, Patsy Mount and Valerie Dyer.

Trixie's acceptance of male homosexuality is decades ahead of her time. Prior to the events of the series, she happily served as cover for a gay medical student, providing him the appearance of propriety. Her disgust of a young father arrested in a cottaging sting is entirely the result of his infidelity; with whom he cheated is immaterial to her.

Discovering that Barbara is going out with Tom gives her quite a shock and she finds it very difficult to accept, but after a talk with Tom and Barbara she finally accepts that she can no longer hold on to Tom and must let him go. She becomes very close to Patsy, Delia, Barbara and Sister Mary Cynthia.

In January 1962, while seconded to a clinic in Africa and dozens of miles from a physician, Trixie becomes the only one of the midwives—lay or nuns—to have performed a Cesarean section. She returns to Poplar a few months later as she stays on at the clinic returning via the Mother House, when it is realised that Sister Mary Cynthia has gone missing.

Later in 1962, she meets dentist Christopher Dockerill. When a turn of events leads to them delivering a baby, they grow close. She later suspects that she is being cheated on by Dockerill, but learns that he actually has a child from a prior marriage, which he had not previously disclosed. She forgives him because he was scared to tell her, fearing he would be rejected. After a difficult situation involving a family, Trixie breaks up with Christopher expressing concern of the effect on his daughter. Trixie takes another extended leave after relapsing into alcoholism.

She returns to Poplar and continues to work with in the community, she is involved in several cases around abortion and is present when Valerie is called to her grandmother's pub. Trixie continues to fight for Nonnatus House and the community of Poplar.

Trixie is seconded to the Lady Emily Clinic where she meets Fiona and Matthew Aylward. She assists in the birth of their son, Johnathan. However, Fiona later returns to the clinic and it is revealed she has terminal cancer and she soon dies. Matthew eventually turns out to be the owner of many properties in Poplar and offers to become a beneficiary to Nonnatus House in memory of his late wife, allowing their services to continue. Trixie and Matthew become close friends due to their shared experience with Fiona and this continues to grow, blossoming into romance and eventually marriage in 1968. When nursing she goes by the name Beatrix "Trixie" Aylward, rather than her official title Beatrix, Lady Aylward.

After Matthew suffers financial hardship, he moves to New York. This leads to Trixie splitting her time between Poplar and New York. In December 1970, Trixie is promoted to nursing sister when Sister Julienne, Shelagh and Phyllis are sent to Hong Kong and it is announced she will return to Poplar in the autumn of 1971.

=== Shelagh Turner (née Mannion) ===
Shelagh Turner
- Call The Midwife character
- Portrayed by: Laura Main
- Duration: 2012–
- First appearance: Series 1, Episode 1
- Introduced by: Jennifer Worth
In-universe information
- Occupation: Midwife and nurse (Series 1–2, 4–), Medical sister-in-charge (surgery) (Series 4–), nun, acting sister-in-charge (Series 1–2), medical secretary (Series 3–5), senior midwife and nursing sister (Nonnatus House) (Series 7–)
- Husband: Patrick Turner (1958–
- Children: Timothy Turner Angela Turner May Turner (née Tang) Edward 'Teddy' Turner

Sister Bernadette, as she is first known, is Scottish and in her early 30s, the closest in age to Jenny and the other lay midwives. She is the most educated of the nuns and tutors the other nurses whilst providing administrative assistance to Sister Julienne, sometimes covering as her deputy. She joined the order in July 1948. A consummate professional, she has a fresh, uncomplicated approach to her work that means she connects well with Jenny and her other colleagues. In one episode, she is shown to remove her wimple, take her hair down and take off her glasses, expressing her hidden desire to be free.

In Series 2, it becomes clear that Sister Bernadette is lonely and unhappy, questioning whether the convent is her calling. She wishes to do what the other young midwives of her age are doing: going out to the cinema, dancing, and experiencing life as young women. One scene shows Sister Bernadette looking in on the midwives' room while they are drinking and gossiping, but then the door closes; it is a life that cannot be open to her while she remains a nun. In another, Sister Monica Joan points out that she spends most of her time praying for forgiveness. Sister Bernadette eventually breaks down and turns to Sister Julienne for help, confessing that what she really wants is a family and children of her own. As of the 2012 Christmas Special and from Series 2 onward, it becomes clear that Sister Bernadette has fallen in love with the local physician, Dr Turner.

After recovering from a short bout with tuberculosis, Sister Bernadette leaves the convent and reverts to her birth name of Shelagh (née Mannion). However, she still remains close to her faith, joining the Nuns at compline. She becomes engaged to Dr Turner, who has also fallen in love with her. They marry in the 2013 Christmas Special and she becomes stepmother to his 11-year-old son Timothy. After a struggle with infertility, they adopt a baby girl called Angela. In Series 4, it becomes clear Shelagh desperately misses nursing and midwifery, so she returns to full-time work at the surgery and maternity home, first as a medical secretary, and then also as the sister-in-charge at the surgery after Dr Turner is taken ill. She is now the medical sister-in-charge at the surgery and works alongside the other midwives and nuns at the surgery, but does not perform house calls. When at the clinic or being the acting sister-in-charge at Nonnatus House in Sister Julienne's absence, Shelagh dons smart civilian dress, rather than the uniform of the order's other lay nurses, although she eventually obtains a uniform to wear when serving in a nursing capacity at Dr Turner's surgery.

Shelagh also feels guilty after thalidomide is prescribed for women in Poplar who are suffering from morning sickness. When it is linked to with birth deformities of the kind observed in recent months, she says she is as guilty as Patrick because she supported the drug being prescribed.

In Series 6, Shelagh is overcome with joy when she falls pregnant with her first biological child. However, she suffers complications and is taken ill during an inspection of the maternity home. Fearing a miscarriage, she is rushed to hospital, forcing nurses Barbara and Phyllis to take over the running of the surgery. This puts her pregnancy in jeopardy, even after being released from hospital. In preparation for the arrival of their third child, the Turners move from their flat to a new house. She gives birth to a son (Edward 'Teddy' Patrick Turner) with the help of Sister Julienne in the series finale.

Shelagh's return to work at the surgery leads to the Turners hiring Magda as an au pair. However, Madga finds she is pregnant and steals from Nonnatus to induce an abortion. Following this, Madga leaves for Paris to study to be a nurse.

In Series 8, Shelagh and Patrick foster a young Chinese girl named May Tang, after her adoption is delayed due to the prospective father's illness. When the prospective father's illness relapses, the foster placement becomes long-term. In Series 9, the Turners look to adopt May but this is disrupted by May's birth mother, Esther Tang. Esther allows Patrick and Shelagh to be May's guardians but not her legal parents. In Series 11, May injures her foot on a playground, which Esther attempts to use as grounds to have May removed from the Turners. May's adoption is finalised in Series 14.

In Series 12, Shelagh thinks that she might be pregnant again. She feels conflicted about it as previously Shelagh and Patrick had been desperate for a child, but Shelagh does not feel she has the capacity for another child. By the end of the episode, she gets her period and says the pregnancy test she took will either return negative, or if it had been positive, it wouldn’t be anymore.

=== Dr Patrick Turner ===
Patrick Turner
- Call The Midwife character
- Portrayed by: Stephen McGann
- Duration: 2012–
- First appearance: Series 1, Episode 1
- Introduced by: Jennifer Worth
In-universe information
- Occupation: General practitioner; clinical lead
- Wife: Widowed Shelagh Mannion (1958–)
- Sons: Timothy Turner Edward 'Teddy' Turner
- Daughters: Angela Turner (adopted) May Turner (adopted)

Dr Turner is Poplar's local physician, as well as being the GP to all the midwives and nuns. He works closely with the midwives, helping at clinics, deliveries and at the birthing hospital and is incredibly dedicated to his patients and to his work, including fighting bureaucratic red tape to save lives with a tuberculosis x-ray screening van. He is a widower and father to Timothy and does his best to juggle the demands of being a single parent with his responsibilities as a doctor. In Series 2, it becomes apparent that he has fallen in love with Sister Bernadette, but her vows stand in the way of their relationship. After her diagnosis with tuberculosis forces her to examine what she truly wants, he makes it quietly clear to her that while the decision is hers, he is in love with her and wishes to share his life with her. She leaves the convent and chooses a different path, accepting his proposal of marriage after she has overcome her tuberculosis.

When trying to adopt, it is revealed that he suffered mental health issues after the war. Overwork and a misdiagnosis in Series 4 drives him to illness, forcing Shelagh and Patsy to take over the running of the practice. He prescribes thalidomide for women suffering from morning sickness, but when it is linked to birth deformities, he faces guilt for having prescribed the medication in the first place.

In Series 6, Dr Turner is overcome with joy when Shelagh becomes pregnant with her first biological child. However, she suffers complications and is taken ill during an inspection of the maternity home and rushed to hospital fearing a miscarriage. This puts her pregnancy in jeopardy. Following Shelagh's discharge from hospital and in preparation for the arrival of their third child, the Turners move from their flat to a new house. She gives birth to a son (Edward "Teddy" Turner) with the help of Sister Julienne in the series finale, with Dr Turner in the room.

Shelagh's return to work at the surgery leads to the Turners hiring Magda as an au pair. However, Madga finds she is pregnant and steals from Nonnatus to induce an abortion. Following this, Madga leaves for Paris to study to be a nurse.

In Series 8, Shelagh and Patrick foster a young Chinese girl named May Tang, after her adoption is delayed due to the prospective father's illness. When the prospective father's illness relapses, the foster placement becomes long-term. In Series 9, the Turners look to adopt May but are disrupted by May's birth mother, Esther Tang. Esther allows Patrick and Shelagh to be her guardians but not her legal parents. In Series 11, May injures her foot on a playground, which Esther attempts to use as grounds to have May removed from the Turners. May's adoption is finalised in Series 14.

In Series 11, Patrick is involved in a train crash, sustaining a head injury and a broken wrist, but suffers no long-term consequences.

=== Frederick "Fred" Buckle ===
Fred Buckle
- Call The Midwife character
- Portrayed by: Cliff Parisi
- Duration: 2012–
- First appearance: Series 1, Episode 1
- Introduced by: Heidi Thomas
In-universe information
- Occupation: Handyman, Scout Leader, Civil Defence Corps Deputy Party Leader
- Wife: Mrs Betty Buckle (deceased) Violet Gee (1960–)
- Daughters: Marlene Dooley Dolly
- Grandsons: Anthony
- Granddaughters: Samantha
- First cousins: Ivy Jackson
- Other relatives: Reggie Jackson

Fred is the handyman at Nonnatus House, having acted as such since the end of World War II. (Note: In Series 4 (set in 1960), Fred states that he has been struggling with the building's boiler for 15 years. This also impacts the continuity, as Nonnatus House had relocated to that building at the start of Series 3, their former building having been rendered structurally unsound by a bomb blast on Christmas Day 1958.) In the evenings, he volunteers as a scout leader and as a deputy party leader (Note: As indicated by his corporal stripes.) in charge of the neighbourhood Civil Defence Corps squad. He is friends with all of the midwives and often gives them help and advice, and is constantly trying to earn money with a variety of schemes that tend not to work. Fred is the father of two daughters—Dolly, who lives in Australia with her husband and their two children, Anthony and Samantha; and Marlene, who is also married and has recently moved back to England after living in Canada for several years.

Before becoming the handyman at Nonnatus, he was in the British Army, during which time his wife was killed, leaving his daughters to be shuffled around between several of his family members, causing him great pain and tempting him to desert. In Series 4, after 20 years of being a widower, Fred takes an interest in local shop owner Violet Gee; after several months of flirting during their community volunteering duties, Fred asks Violet to a charity dance. By the end of Series 4 Fred proposes to Violet—and, after dealing with his clingy daughter Marlene, he and Violet marry.

In Series 6, Fred's cousin Ivy dies. This leads to Fred and Violet taking in her son, Reggie Jackson. Whilst most of the time Reggie lives in a supported community, he frequently returns home to Fred and Violet's.

In the 2020 Christmas special, Fred opens up a newsagent's shop not far from Nonnatus House with support from Violet and her experience running a shop. In Series 10, Fred lets the flat above the shop to Cyril.

After a young girl gets hit by a car in Series 12, Fred takes on the role of lollipop man.

In Series 13, Fred contracts tetanus, also known as lockjaw, following an injury he sustained while helping Reggie do up a church garden. He makes a full recovery.

=== Phyllis Crane ===
Phyllis Crane
- Call The Midwife character
- Portrayed by: Linda Bassett
- Duration: 2015–
- First appearance: Series 4, Episode 2
- Introduced by: Heidi Thomas
In-universe information
- Occupation: Senior nurse, midwife, deputy sister-in-charge (medical)
- Aunts: Lillian

Phyllis is a veteran nurse who also arrives at Nonnatus House in early-1960. A neat and forthright woman, Phyllis is viewed at first as somewhat snobby; she is vegetarian and is not scared to put her ideas forward to improve Nonnatus House. She confides in Vaughan Sellars, the father of a terminated baby, that she was born an illegitimate child, and confides to former street walker Roseanne Dawley that her mother too was a prostitute. In Series 5, it is seen that she has formed more of a relationship with Barbara and has taken quite a high role in Nonnatus House. Having discovered Patsy and Delia's relationship, she is supportive of heartbroken Delia when Patsy sails to Hong Kong to care for her dying father.

She is also very close to her roommate, Barbara, and serves as something of a surrogate mother figure to her much younger colleague. In Series 6, after her return from Africa, Sister Julienne becomes deputy sister-in-charge to Sister Ursula, meaning Phyllis is demoted to Nursing Sister. When Sister Ursula leaves, Phyllis is reinstated as deputy sister–in–charge again.

Following Patsy's departure, she takes over as a leader of the local Wolf Cub Scouts.

Driving back from a successful delivery, Phyllis knocks over one of the family's other children with her car and is left devastated by the possible consequences. She faces suspension by the Central Midwives Board over her actions and is told by Sister Julienne to focus on the administrative duties. However, the family ask Sergeant Noakes to drop the case.

When Shelagh is unwell and goes on maternity leave, it is expected she will take over as acting sister-in-charge of the surgery.

Also in series 6, Phyllis is Barbara's bridesmaid.

In Series 7, Phyllis nearly dies after a fire destroys a local shop.

In Series 11, Phyllis wins £5,000 (worth approximately £70,000 in 2022) on the premium bonds. Initially unsettled by the news, Phyllis uses the money to go on all the holidays she'd ever dreamed of by taking a coach tour of Europe. Phyllis returns after the train crash, having been alerted by Miss Higgins, and sets to work getting Nonnatus House back in order.

In Series 12, Phyllis receives a summons from the London Board of Health, as she is past the statutory retirement age. Phyllis suspects this was due to an interaction at a ventouse extractor training course she attended. Sister Monica Joan accompanies Nurse Crane, against Phyllis' wishes. Sister Monica Joan states that Phyllis is younger than the three men trying to get her to retire. She is allowed to continue working as long as she attends the refresher courses.

=== Violet Buckle ===
Violet Buckle
- Call The Midwife character
- Portrayed by: Annabelle Apsion
- Duration: 2015–
- First appearance: Series 4, Episode 1
- Introduced by: Heidi Thomas
In-universe information
- Occupation: Haberdashery owner, Brown Owl (Brownie Pack Leader), Councilwoman
- Husband: Bert Gee (deceased) Fred Buckle (1960–)

Violet Buckle is the second wife of Fred Buckle. She owns her own haberdashery shop, called Violet Gee. She has a son who lives in Plymouth by her previous husband, Bert, who was killed in the war like Fred's deceased wife. She volunteers as a uniformed leader of the local Brownie pack as the Brown Owl of the unit.

After successfully organising community events in series 7, Violet runs for the local council in series 8, which she wins. In series 13, Violet runs for mayor, winning again. In series 14, the incoming mayor's illness means Violet is asked to serve a second term as Mayor of Tower Hamlets, which she accepts.

=== Reggie Jackson ===
Reginald Jackson
- Call The Midwife character
- Portrayed by: Daniel Laurie
- Duration: 2017–
- First appearance: Series 6, Episode 5
In-universe information
- Mother: Ivy Jackson (deceased)
- Other relatives: Fred Buckle

Introduced in Series 6, Reggie is a young man with Down syndrome. He originally lives with his mother Ivy. After Ivy dies suddenly from a heart attack, Reggie goes to live with Ivy's cousin Fred Buckle and his wife Violet.

However, realising that Reggie living with them indefinitely will be impractical, Fred and Violet decide whether the best option would be to place him in a residential facility, Glasshouse Trust, a community in the countryside for young adults with all kinds of disabilities who live and work together. Reggie continues to visit Fred and Violet.

=== Millicent Higgins ===
Millicent Trilby Higgins
- Call The Midwife character
- Portrayed by: Georgie Glen
- Duration: 2018–
- First appearance: Series 8, Episode 0
In-universe information
- Occupation: Surgery secretary
- Children: Victor Chopra (son) Mariam Chopra (daughter-in-law)
- Grandchildren: Harry Chopra (grandson)

In Series 8, Miss Higgins joins Dr Turner's surgery as a receptionist. She speaks Punjabi, having lived in India during her childhood while her father was stationed.

Later in series 8, Miss Higgins visits Nurse Crane in hospital, who has injured her back. During these visits, Miss Higgins crosses paths with Sergeant Woolf and the two develop a liking for each other and begin some sort of relationship. However, after Sergeant Woolf has a major heart attack in series 9 episode 2, he moves away to live with his sister and decides to terminate the relationship.

At the start of Series 10, Miss Higgins spends Christmas at Nonnatus House.

In series 11, Miss Higgins' home is broken into overnight due to a robbery. Due to feeling unsafe, Miss Higgins stays at Nonnatus House, sharing a room with Nurse Crane. Despite having a hard time adjusting to communal living, Miss Higgins hands in notice on her old home. The residents of Nonnatus also struggle sharing their accommodation with Miss Higgins so Sister Julienne speaks to the rector and she moves into the cottage across the road that used to belong to Tom and Barbara Hereward.

At the end of series 11, Miss Higgins supports the team when responding to the train crash, including calling Nurse Crane back from her trip away. Miss Higgins also uses her contacts to find out information about the cause of the crash. Knowing that the driver had a brain tumour that caused seizures is reassuring to the family who feared he had been at fault.

At the start of series 12, Miss Higgins grows closer with Nancy. In Series 13, Miss Higgins helps Nancy learn more about her mother by tracing a ex-nun who helped raise Nancy. In series 14, when Nancy gets engaged to Roger, Miss Higgins supports Nancy by meeting with Esther Noble when concerned about her son's engagement to Nancy. Miss Higgins hosts Nancy when she returns to Popular at the end of Series 14 for her wedding and plays a leading role in the wedding.

Miss Higgins also supports Nurse Crane running the Cubs.

At the end of Series 13, Miss Higgins is visited by the wife of Victor Chopra. It is revealed that Victor is the adoptive name of John, Miss Higgins' illegitimate son. When Miss Higgins was 21, she returned to India and met Krishnan Chaudri. She was working at a private library and he, a tutor, came in to borrow books. The pair fell in love despite the challenges of interracial relationships in India between British and Indian people. Therefore, when Miss Higgins found herself pregnant, she gave the baby up for adoption. Miss Higgins' landlady sent her to Lahore where John was adopted by a Dutch mother and Hindu father.

During Victor's short stay in England he wishes to visit his birth mother hence his wife's visit to Miss Higgins. Miss Higgins, with Nurse Crane's support, hosts afternoon tea for her son and his wife, where he greets Miss Higgins with a hug and flowers. Mr and Mrs Chopra share that they have a son Hari, spelt Harry when at university in Liverpool.

Later Mrs Chopra shares with Nurse Crane that Victor has Bright's disease of the kidneys. During his stay in England, Victor's health deteriorates and he dies in Miss Higgins' home, with his wife, son, Miss Higgins, Nurse Crane and Doctor Turner present. Miss Higgins reflects that she was present at Victor's first and last breaths. Miss Higgins and Harry visit the Thames to lay the flowers Victor brought in the water, reflecting on the Hindu traditions typically performed at the Ganges.

As Harry is still studying in Liverpool, he continues to visit Miss Higgins, including in the 2024 Christmas special, and calls her Auntie, reflecting Indian tradition.

=== Cyril Robinson ===
Cyril Alphonse Robinson
- Call The Midwife character
- Portrayed by: Zephryn Taitte
- Duration: 2019–
- First appearance: Series 8, Episode 5
In-universe information
- Occupation: Mechanic, Child Welfare Officer
- Wife: Lucille Anderson(1968-1971); Rosalind Clifford (1971-)

When Phyllis needs a mechanic, Fred recommends Cyril. Lucille and Cyril meet when Cyril is fixing Phyllis' car and Lucille returns from her rounds. The pair begin a relationship soon after.

As well as being a mechanic and studying Civil Engineering, Cyril becomes a Pastor at Lucille's church.

Lucille and Cyril's relationship continues and Cyril proposes to Lucille in series 10. They marry in the 2021 Christmas special.

In Series 11, Lucille moves in with Cyril and Lucille realises she is pregnant. However, Lucille miscarries while working at the maternity home. In series 12, Lucille and Cyril try again to conceive but do not succeed. The failure to conceive, missing home and increased racial tensions sadden Lucille. Therefore, Cyril takes some money out of their house savings to pay for Lucille to take a trip back to Jamaica. Later in the series, after Cyril is injured when trying to restrain a mentally ill man, he phones Lucille in Jamaica, but her sister reveals that Lucille is at work hence will be staying for at least six months. Cyril flies to Jamaica to visit Lucille.

Cyril later works at the Department for Housing but leaves that role after seeing an advert for social workers. Cyril is driven by a desire to help people rather than condemn their homes. He then works as a child welfare officer from series 13 onwards.

At the beginning of series 13, Cyril takes in a stray cat and names him Nigel. Unfortunately, in series 14, Nigel gets Weil's disease during the bin strike and passes away.

Also in Series 14, Cyril visits Lucille again and confirms the pair will be getting divorced.

Following this confirmation, Rosalind and Cyril begin a relationship despite concerns about the prejudice they will face.

=== Sister Veronica ===
Sister Veronica
- Call The Midwife character
- Portrayed by: Rebecca Gethings
- Duration: 2023–
- First appearance: Series 12, Episode 1
In-universe information
- Occupation: Nun, Health visitor, Nurse

Sister Veronica, birth name Beryl, joins Nonnatus House as a health visitor, arriving with some of her own grapefruit marmalade. Little is known about Sister Veronica's childhood, though her father was a regimental sergeant major.

Sister Veronica was previously a trainee dispensing chemist, hence has maintained an interest in pharmacy. She also spent 13 years in Hong Kong with the order, working alongside Mother Milred and looking after May Tang. She also spent time alongside Mrs Turner (Sister Bernadette at the time) at the Mother House.

Sister Veronica is reluctant to take up cycling, hence lies that she is missing half a lung in an attempt to gain access to a car. When the lie is corrected by Mother Mildred, Sister Julienne is firm that for anything other than a bicycle, she would have to find alternative funding. She requests funding from Matthew Alyward to fund a scooter.

When needed, Sister Veronica also works as a midwife. In her first episode, she states that she had previously delivered 97 babies.

In the 2024 Christmas special, Sister Veronica reflects with Geoffrey that they are all spinsters in a way and wonders if she will ever get married.

=== Joyce Highland ===
Joyce Highland Claudine Warren
- Call The Midwife character
- Portrayed by: Renee Bailey
- Duration: 2024-
- First appearance: Series 13, Episode 1
In-universe information
- Occupation: Pupil Midwife, Midwife

Joyce Highland arrives at Nonnatus as part of a group of trainee midwives, also including Rosalind Clifford, Norelle Morris and Kathy Downes. Joyce boards at Nonnatus, sharing with Rosalind in the bedroom previously shared by Trixie and various other midwives. In their room, Joyce displays awards she received during her training, including the Sister Dorothea Headley Medal and Astonbury Cup.

Joyce was brought up by her grandma in Trinidad who had died before Joyce joined Nonnatus.

During her training, Joyce assists with a delivery alongside Trixie, but Trixie is distracted by challenges at home with Matthew. Consequently, Trixie does not check the placenta carefully, which has been made difficult by the mother's excessive smoking. A piece of retained placenta makes the mother very unwell and Joyce is concerned it wwill affect her training. Rosalind speaks to Sister Juliene, highlighting what Joyce had said about Trixie being distracted. Therefore, Trixie takes the blame.

In Episode 6, the pupil midwives do their final exams and receive their results. All the pupil midwives pass. Sister Julienne offers both Joyce and Rosalind permanent positions at Nonnatus House, which they accept.

On her first day as a qualified midwife, Sylvester Warren visits Nonnatus House posing as Joyce's cousin. Sylvester is actually Joyce's abusive husband who she came to England to escape. Joyce changed her name from Claudine Warren to avoid being found, hence her nursing qualifications are technically under a false name. He blackmails Joyce, wanting money in return for not sharing her secret with Nonnatus House. When Rosalind finds out, she persuades Joyce to tell her the truth and informs Sister Julienne. Sister Julienne encourages Joyce to put things in order, but assures her that her job is not in doubt.

In series 14, a patient refuses treatment from Joyce due to racism. Joyce spots that the patient is suffering from a deep vein thrombosis so telephones to request that Dr Turner visit as soon as possible. The patient accuses Joyce of being at fault. As Joyce was visiting the patient alone, it is her word against the patient's. Consequently, there is an inquiry, but Joyce is completely exonerated.

=== Rosalind Robinson ===
Rosalind Clifford
- Call The Midwife character
- Portrayed by: Natalie Quarry
- Duration: 2024-
- First appearance: Series 13, Episode 1
In-universe information
- Occupation: Pupil Midwife, Midwife
- Parents: Josephine Clifford and Major Aubrey Clifford
- Husband: Cyril Robinson (1971-)

Rosalind Clifford arrives at Nonnatus as part of a group of trainee midwives, also including Joyce Highland, Norelle Morris and Kathy Downes. Rosalind is slightly later than the others, having struggled with directions. Rosalind boards at Nonnatus, despite original plans to board with Norelle and Kathy, as Rosalind is vegetarian like Nurse Crane. Therefore, Rosalind shares with Joyce Highland in the bedroom previously shared by Trixie and various other midwives.

Rosalind grew up living in a boys' boarding school as her father was headmaster.

In Episode 6, the pupil midwives do their final exams and receive their results. In preparation, Nurse Crane helps Rosalind revise and relax with an exercise-quiz combo. All the pupil midwives pass. Sister Julienne offers both Joyce and Rosalind permanent positions at Nonnatus House, which they accept.

In series 14, during the bin strike, Rosalind develops Weil's disease and is admitted to hospital. During her stay in hospital, Cyril and Rosalind admit their feelings towards each other and begin a relationship. Joyce is concerned for her friend due to the discrimination they will likely face, especially given her recent experiences with a racist patient.

=== Sister Catherine ===
Sandra Cantwell Sister Catherine
- Call The Midwife character
- Portrayed by: Molly Vevers
- Duration: 2025–
- First appearance: Series 14, Episode 4
In-universe information
- Occupation: Postulant, Pediatric nurse and training midwife, Nun
- Sisters: Helen Cantwell

In series 14, Sister Catherine, nee Cantwell, arrives at Nonnatus House as a postulant nun and trainee midwife. Before entering religious life, she was a pediatric nurse, hence she has more experience with young patients.

Catherine comes from a non-religious family, so her choice to join the religious life led to estrangement from her family. Before her first vows, she questioned whether a life devoted to serving others could ever outweigh the pain it caused her loved ones.

Sister Catherine travels with Sister Juilenne to the Mother House to take her first vows and is visited by her sister, Helen, who watches her take her vows. Sister Veronica and Sister Monica Joan are also present.

== Supporting characters ==
=== Dr Timothy Turner ===
Timothy Tim Turner
- Call The Midwife character
- Portrayed by: Max Macmillan
- Duration: 2012–
- First appearance: Series 2, Episode 0
- Introduced by: Jenny Worth
In-universe information
- Occupation: Specialist Registrar & GP Registrar
- Father: Patrick Turner
- Mother: Shelagh Turner (step-mother)
- Brothers: Edward Turner
- Sisters: Angela Turner May Turner (née Tang)

Timothy is the son of Patrick Turner and stepson of Shelagh Turner. He is a smart, tall child and attends the local grammar school. In 2013 Christmas special he suffers from polio, which affects his legs. He slowly recuperates and eventually fully recovers. He is seen to have an interest in medicine, and in Series 5 he helps his mother and father out more in the surgery. Timothy sets off on a crusade to make his parents give up smoking after seeing the damage it has done to their health. He is pleased when, in the following series, his stepmother gives birth to his brother. In series 10, Tim leaves Poplar to go to medical school. He returns during holidays, when he helps as his father's assistant as well as assisting at clinic and as Miss Higgins' clerical assistant.

In the 2025 Christmas special, while the Turners and most of the senior members of Nonntaus House are in Hong Kong, Hari and Timothy organise a party at Nonntaus House. Timothy, under increased pressure trying to work with a locum at the surgery who struggles with delivering babies and trying to look after his siblings, results in a drunken night with other junior doctors and trainee midwives, much to the annoyance of Trixie who is the acting sister-in-charge. He formally qualifies in 1971, joining the practice.

=== Angela Turner ===
Angela Turner
- Call The Midwife character
- Portrayed by: Alice Brown
- Duration: 2014–
- First appearance: Series 3, Episode 8
- Introduced by: Heidi Thomas
In-universe information
- Father: Patrick Turner
- Mother: Shelagh Turner
- Brothers: Timothy Turner Edward "Teddy" Turner
- Sisters: May Turner (née Tang)

Angela is the adopted daughter of Shelagh and Patrick Turner. She is first seen in the Series 3 finale and is briefly seen in Series 4 and 5 usually with Shelagh, Patrick or Timothy. She was born to a 16-year-old mother, and was put up for adoption after birth, when the Turners adopt her. It is mentioned in the series that she has a fear of squirrels. Only a few things are known about Angela's biological family. Angela's birth mother was an unwed sixteen year-old whose parents had changed their mind last minute about keeping the baby. Their last name is also mentioned to be Jones. Her future parents (Patrick and Shelagh) decided to adopt after being informed that Shelagh was unlikely to conceive. Patrick and Shelagh are parents to a son, Timothy, from Patrick's first marriage.

=== Edward "Teddy" Turner ===
Edward Turner
- Call The Midwife character
- Portrayed by: Edward Shaw
- Duration: 2017–
- First appearance: Series 6, Episode 8
- Introduced by: Heidi Thomas
In-universe information
- Father: Patrick Turner
- Mother: Shelagh Turner
- Brothers: Timothy Turner
- Sisters: Angela Turner May Turner (née Tang)

Edward "Teddy" Patrick Turner is the biological son of Patrick and Shelagh Turner, making him the half-brother of Timothy and the adoptive brother of Angela as well as the foster/adoptive brother of May. Teddy is delivered by Sister Julienne in the final episode of Series 6.

At the start of the 2024 Christmas special, Teddy is an inpatient at St Cuthberts while recovering from an adenoidectomy.

=== May Turner ===
May Turner née Tang
- Call The Midwife character
- Portrayed by: April Rae Hong
- Duration: 2018–
- First appearance: Series 8, Episode 0
- Introduced by: Heidi Thomas
In-universe information
- Father: Patrick Turner (adoptive)
- Mother: Shelagh Turner (adoptive) Esther Tang (birth)
- Brothers: Christopher Tang Timothy Turner Edward Turner
- Sisters: Angela Turner

In the 2018 Christmas Special, May Tang comes to England as part of the Hong Kong adoption project. However, May's adoption is delayed due to the prospective father's illness. It is decided that May isn't suited to living in an orphanage while she waits, so she is fostered by the Turners. When the prospective father's illness relapses, the foster placement becomes long-term.

In Series 9, the Turners look to adopt May, but this is disrupted by May's birth mother, Esther Tang. Esther allows Patrick and Shelagh to be her guardians but not her legal parents.

In Series 11, May injures her foot on a playground, which Esther attempts to use as grounds to have May removed from the Turners. In Series 13, May again finds herself in danger when she is separated from the group on a trip to the seaside and is found struggling in the sea. Whilst she initially appears okay, she develops water aspiration and is admitted to hospital to recover.

May's adoption is finalised in Series 14. In the series 15 Christmas special, May's little brother Christopher is temporarily taken in by the Turners so he can receive treatment for Wilms' tumour, childhood kidney cancer.

=== Harry Chopra ===
Harry Chopra
- Call The Midwife character
- Portrayed by: Eisa Latif
- Duration: 2024-
- First appearance: Series 13, Episode 8
- Last appearance: Series 14, Episode 8
In-universe information
- Occupation: Specialist Registrar (Dentistry)
- Parents: Victor Chopra Mariam Chopra
- Grandparents: Millicent Higgins

When his father, Victor Chopra, visits England, Harry is a dentistry student at Liverpool. During his stay in England, Victor's health declines so Harry visits his father at Miss Higgins' house. This is the first time Harry meets Miss Higgins, his biological grandmother. Harry stays with Miss Higgins after his father dies. Together they lay flowers bought by Victor in the Thames, on the Hindu traditions typically performed at the Ganges.

In the 2024 Christmas Special, Harry visits Miss Higgins. He helps the others prepare a Christmas meal for lonely members of the community. Harry also joins her and others at Nonnatus House on Christmas Day. Miss Higgins gifts him a jumper she has knitted, with Nurse Crane's help.

Harry visits Miss Higgins again in Series 14, as it is his university summer holiday. He helps with admin at Dr Turner's surgery and the clinic, like Timothy Turner had done previously. Dr Turner also takes Harry out on some of his house calls. Consequently, Harry considers a switch from dentistry to general practice.

In the 2025 Christmas special, while the Turners and most of the senior members of Nonntaus House are in Hong Kong, Hari and Timothy organise a party at Nonntaus House. Timothy, under increased pressure trying to work with a locum at the surgery who struggles with delivering babies and trying to look after his siblings, results in a drunken night with other junior doctors and trainee midwives, much to the annoyance of Trixie who is the acting sister-in-charge.

== Previous characters ==
=== Nurse Jenny Lee ===
Jenny Lee
- Call The Midwife character
- Portrayed by: Jessica Raine Vanessa Redgrave (mature)
- Duration: 2012–2014
- First appearance: Series 1, Episode 1
- Last appearance: Series 4, Episode 0
- Introduced by: Herself
In-universe information
- Occupation: Nurse, midwife, nursing sister (Series 3)

Nurse Jenny Lee arrives at Nonnatus House in 1957, at the age of 22, completely unaware of the world she is about to enter. Believing she has accepted a job with a small private hospital, she is somewhat surprised to find that she has moved into a convent. Furthermore, the deprivation of the East End is a huge culture shock for the young woman who has enjoyed a privileged upbringing in the home counties and spent time in Paris before training as a nurse. However, although initially shocked by the conditions in which her patients live, Jenny comes to accept the material limitations of the world in which she works and to love the people who must live there.

Jenny has come to London to try and run away from her feelings for a married man, Gerald. Her best friend Jimmy arrives, and although he makes her feel more at ease, he also makes things more complicated by revealing that he is in love with her. She turns him down and they remain friends. She becomes good friends with her colleagues and patients, and always tries to help those around her. Toward the end of Series 2, she starts dating Alec, a friend of Jimmy's. Halfway through Series 3, Alec dies in a tragic accident and after his funeral, Jenny travels to the Nonnatans' mother house in Chichester for compassionate leave. She returns to Nonnatus House after taking time to grieve, and decides to begin working at the London Hospital in the Maternity Ward. She leaves soon after, not liking the hospital's policy of requiring impersonal relationships between nurses and their patients.

At the end of Series 3, she meets Phillip Worth (her future husband), the cousin of an expectant mother for whom she is caring and begins a relationship with him. She eventually decides to pursue a career change to care for those with terminal illnesses; she leaves Nonnatus House to work at the Marie Curie Hospital in Hampstead. It is shown in the Series 3 Christmas Special that she eventually marries Phillip and starts a family, and still keeps in contact with the friends she made at Nonnatus House.

=== Camilla "Chummy" Noakes (née Fortescue-Cholmondeley-Browne) ===
Camilla "Chummy" Noakes
- Call The Midwife character
- Portrayed by: Miranda Hart
- Duration: 2012–2015
- First appearance: Series 1, Episode 2
- Last appearance: Series 4, Episode 8
- Introduced by: Jennifer Worth
In-universe information
- Occupation: Midwife and nurse, Matron Aston Lodge
- Mother: Lady Browne
- Husband: Peter Noakes (1957–
- Sons: Fred Noakes

By the end of Series 1, after a string of dates,Chummy marries Police Constable Peter Noakes. After clinic, she swaps her nursing uniform for a scouting one, as Akela of the local Wolf Cubs whom she leads with Fred—a role later taken on by Patsy. In Series 2, Chummy applies for a place as a CMS missionary in Sierra Leone, Africa. She is accepted and she and Peter move to Africa for six months. Upon their return, Chummy reveals that she is pregnant, much to the delight of her fellow nurses. In the final episode of Series 2 Chummy goes into labour and, despite complications, she gives birth to a son, Fred. Chummy once states that she has never been happier than when she was at Nonnatus House. In Series 4, Chummy, Peter and Freddie move to Aston Lodge mother and baby home, where Chummy is employed as the temporary, replacement matron.

=== Sister Evangelina ===
Sister Evangelina
- Call The Midwife character
- Portrayed by: Pam Ferris
- Duration: 2012–2016; 2026
- First appearance: Series 1, Episode 1
- Last appearance: Series 15, Episode 8
In-universe information
- Occupation: Nun, midwife and nurse

Sister Evangelina is the only one of the sisters who comes from the same tough, uncompromising background as the community they serve. Physically vigorous, she has a robust sense of humour. Her energy and drive make her extraordinarily effective at her job. However, she does not suffer fools gladly and her blunt speech and attitude often offend. She has a particularly contentious relationship with the aristocratic Sister Monica Joan, who often provokes her to breaking point. Growing up in poverty has toughened her up, making her a very comical character in the show.

Sister Evangelina knows a lot about the poverty and hardships in Poplar and often shares her insights with the young midwives. She is very close to Sister Julienne, to whom she often serves as a sounding board. In Series 3, it is revealed she has several siblings including an older brother who was killed on active service in a war and a younger brother, Vincent, who returns to her life after being absent for several years during her golden jubilee. It was seeing the birth of Vincent that inspired a young Sister Evangelina to become a nun during her formative years, a goal she achieved in 1909. In 1960, Sister Evangelina has to have an operation due to illness. Her pre-order name was Enid Atwood. In 1961, Sister Evangelina temporarily leaves Nonnatus House for an enclosed order. She returns in Episode 7. She announces that she had a stroke two months after she left the convent and has now lost movement in her left arm. In Episode 8, Sister Evangelina dies following a second stroke.

Despite her gruff exterior and apparent lack of patience with others, she is deeply cherished and respected by not only her colleagues, but her Poplar community, a great many of whom she delivered—as evidenced by the masses who turned out to congratulate her on the occasion of her jubilee, and to pay their final respects two years later.

She reappears as a ghost in the final episode of series 15, as Sister Monica Joan dies, alongside several other deceased Sisters.

=== Sister Mary Cynthia ===
Sister Mary Cynthia
- Call The Midwife character
- Portrayed by: Bryony Hannah
- Duration: 2012–2017
- First appearance: Series 1, Episode 1
- Last appearance: Series 6, Episode 6
- Introduced by: Jennifer Worth
In-universe information
- Occupation: Nurse, midwife; later nun (Series 4–)

Nurse Cynthia Miller, like Trixie, is also a resident at Nonnatus House when Jenny arrives. She volunteers as a uniformed leader of the local Girls' Brigade.

Cynthia is the most sensitive of the young midwives, and gets very emotionally involved with some of her patients.

In Series 2, when a child dies after she delivers him, the people of Poplar suspect her of making a mistake that cost the baby its life. Cynthia begins to doubt her abilities, which takes a heavy toll on her work and health. She suffers a breakdown, but recovers with the help of Sister Julienne. An autopsy report confirms that the baby's death was due to lungs that never fully inflated. In the 2014 Christmas Special, Cynthia decides to become a postulant and leaves Nonnatus House for six months of training, promising Trixie and Patsy that she will return. In Series 4, Cynthia returns to Nonnatus House after her training is complete, having chosen the religious name of Sister Mary Cynthia. Though she now spends less time with her friends, she remains close to Trixie and ultimately convinces her to get help for her alcoholism. She is also close with Sister Winfred and Barbara.

In Series 5 Episode 6 Sister Mary Cynthia is violently attacked at the docks by a man. She thinks it is a test of faith but with the help of Sister Monica Joan, she goes to the police, and is able to return to her duties. When Sister Ursula asks about her life vows, it becomes clear that the attack is still affecting her. In Series 6, Sister Mary Cynthia is sent to the Mother House by Sister Ursula.

When Trixie returns to Poplar from South Africa, it is realised that Sister Mary Cynthia has gone missing from the Mother House. She is found in an asylum where she has been admitted as a patient, but it is apparent that she is not getting the help she needs. Dr Turner and Sister Julienne work to get her discharged into their care, and send her to a community for mental health care. She reverts to her birth name, Cynthia.

=== Peter Noakes ===
Peter Noakes
- Call The Midwife character
- Portrayed by: Ben Caplan
- Duration: 2012–2017
- First appearance: Series 1, Episode 2
- Last appearance: Series 6, Episode 7
- Introduced by: Jennifer Worth
In-universe information
- Occupation: Police sergeant
- Wife: Camilla Fortescue-Cholmondeley-Browne (1957–
- Sons: Fred Noakes

Peter is a Police Constable, and later Sergeant, in Poplar. He is first introduced in Series 1, when he is run over by Chummy on her bicycle and takes an immediate shine to her. Throughout Series 1, they go on a string of dates, eventually marrying in the series' final episode. In Series 2, he follows Chummy to Sierra Leone while she fulfills her desire to be a missionary. In the final episode of that series, he and Chummy have a baby, whom they name Fred. During his service in the Second World War, he earned the 1939–1945 Star, Defence Medal, France and Germany Star, and War Medal 1939–1945, as shown on his uniform tunic.

=== Patience "Patsy" Mount ===
Patience "Patsy" Mount
- Call The Midwife character
- Portrayed by: Emerald Fennell
- Duration: 2013–2017
- First appearance: Series 2, Episode 3
- Last appearance: Series 6, Episode 8
- Introduced by: Heidi Thomas
In-universe information
- Occupation: Midwife and nurse

Patsy is first seen in Series 2, Episode 3, as a nurse in the male surgical ward at the London Hospital. She then appears in Series 3, Episode 5 as a new midwife. She is tall, elegant and favours slightly tailored clothes and becomes the first midwife to wear trousers. She has a very brisk manner but later reveals that at the age of nine that she and her mother and sister were sent to a Japanese war camp, and that she was the only one to survive. Like Chummy before her, Patsy works with Fred as a leader of the local Wolf Cub Scouts; she recruits Delia to help teach first aid. It is seen in Series 4 that she has a very close friendship with veteran Nurse Trixie and new Nurse Barbara. She is also quite close to Sister Mary Cynthia and Sister Winifred.

Patsy is seen to have a very close and romantic relationship with female surgical Nurse Delia Busby, with whom she had previously worked at the London. They plan to move into a flat together at the end of Series 4, but their future is shattered when Delia is involved in a cycling accident and suffers a serious head injury which results in amnesia, leaving her with no memory of Patsy. The amnesia is only temporary, however, and Patsy and Delia are reunited in Series 5 when Delia accepts an offer from Sister Julienne to live at Nonnatus House. Later in Series 5, Patsy and Delia go to the Gateways Club, a private club for lesbians. It is revealed in the Series 5 finale that Patsy and Delia are going to Paris together in spring 1962. She shares a room with Nurse Trixie, replacing Jenny Lee. Series 6 sees her temporarily leave Nonnatus House after learning her father is dying in Hong Kong. Delia is upset that she cannot go with her as support, as she is training to be a midwife. Following her father's death, Patsy seems to drop all correspondence with Delia, appearing as though she would not return to Nonnatus House, but she comes back to London on the day of Tom and Barbara's wedding. Patsy and Delia share their first on-screen kiss.

In the Series 8 Christmas Special, Patsy and Delia mail a card from Scotland to Nonnatus House.

=== Delia Busby ===
Delia Busby
- Call The Midwife character
- Portrayed by: Kate Lamb
- Duration: 2015–2017
- First appearance: Series 4, Episode 2
- Last appearance: Series 6, Episode 8
In-universe information
- Occupation: Staff nurse at the London (until 1961), trainee midwife, nurse, St John Ambulance volunteer

Originally from Wales, Delia is a very close friend of Patsy's, having worked together in the London Hospital's male surgical ward. She resides in the hospital's nurses home, (Note: Delia's mother confirms in Episode 5.1 that the nurses' home was operated by the London Hospital until its demolition in late 1960 or early 1961.) and volunteers evenings for St John Ambulance. In her St John capacity, she works with Patsy's and Fred's scouts, principally teaching them first aid. She is revealed to be in a romantic relationship with Patsy, but together they conceal their feelings due to society's view of homosexuality at the time. At the end of Series 4, just as the two of them have found a flat to share, she is involved in a cycling accident which leaves her with amnesia, leaving Patsy heartbroken. By the following Christmas, she has regained her memories of Patsy and their relationship, and at the start of Series 5, despite continued efforts from her mother to take her home to Wales, Delia accepts Sister Julienne's invitation to board at Nonnatus House when she returns to work at the London in the coming months. By the end of Series 5, she appears to be quite close to Trixie and Barbara, and is delighted when Trixie confides in her that she attends Alcoholics Anonymous each week.

In the final episode of Series 5, Delia considers additional training as a midwife after successfully talking a young mother through her delivery over the telephone earlier in the series. Delia undertakes training in the following series. During this time, Patsy travels to Hong Kong to visit her dying father, leaving Delia in London. Patsy returns in the series 7 finale, leading to Patsy and Delia sharing their first on-screen kiss

In the Series 8 Christmas Special, Patsy and Delia mail a card from Scotland to Nonnatus House.

=== Barbara Hereward (née Gilbert) ===
Barbara Hereward
- Call The Midwife character
- Portrayed by: Charlotte Ritchie
- Duration: 2015–2018
- First appearance: Series 4, Episode 1
- Last appearance: Series 7, Episode 7
- Introduced by: Heidi Thomas
In-universe information
- Occupation: Midwife and nurse
- Father: Canon Arthur Gilbert
- Sisters: Margaret
- Husband: Tom Hereward (1962–1963)

Barbara Gilbert arrives in Poplar in the early 1960s, still finding her feet in district nursing and midwifery. While she was educated and middle class, she is surprisingly in tune with the needs of the community she serves, having grown up the daughter of a Canon serving in an impoverished area of Liverpool. She is hard working, optimistic, and somewhat naïve. In addition to her nursing duties, she helps teach Sunday school at the local church. In Series 5 she begins a romantic relationship with Tom Hereward after they become close while working together in the parish. She was also quite close to her roommate, Nurse Phyllis Crane, who serves as something of a surrogate mother figure to her much younger colleague. Tom asks her to marry him while they are out in South Africa after consulting with his former fiancée Trixie. They are married in a hurried wedding at the end of Series 6, after Barbara learns that her father has accepted a three-year missionary posting in New Guinea. In Series 7, Barbara dies after contracting meningococcal sepsis, leaving Tom, Nonnatus House and the rest of the Poplar community heartbroken and shattered.

=== Tom Hereward ===
Tom Hereward
- Call The Midwife character
- Portrayed by: Jack Ashton
- Duration: 2014–2018
- First appearance: Series 3, Episode 3
- Last appearance: Series 7, Episode 8
- Introduced by: Jennifer Worth
In-universe information
- Occupation: Curate
- Wife: Barbara Gilbert (deceased) (1962–1963)

Tom arrives in Series 3 as the new Poplar curate. He lives just across the road from Nonnatus House and is shown to have a relationship with Trixie, whom he meets when the two are working the same shift in a women's prison. The two break off their relationship in Series 4. In Series 5, Tom begins seeing Nurse Barbara Gilbert. Tom asks Barbara to marry him while they are out in South Africa after consulting with his former fiancée Trixie. They are married in a hurried wedding at the end of Series 6. This is to enable Barbara's father to marry them before he takes up a three-year missionary posting in New Guinea. Tom later becomes a widower after Barbara dies from meningococcal sepsis. After her death, he travels to New Guinea to work as a missionary with his father in law.

=== Sister Winifred ===
Sister Winifred
- Call The Midwife character
- Portrayed by: Victoria Yeates
- Duration: 2014–2019
- First appearance: Series 3, Episode 1
- Last appearance: Series 8, Episode 1
- Introduced by: Heidi Thomas
In-universe information
- Occupation: Nun, midwife and nurse, former teacher (before 1959)

Sister Winifred arrives at Nonnatus House at the beginning of Series 3. Sister Winifred is the same age as Jenny, Trixie and Cynthia. She finds midwifery hard. She tries twice to make a harvest loaf for the Harvest Festival, stating 'my mother made it look so easy.' She eventually succeeds on the second attempt. She seems to be close to Patsy Mount. She is then close to Sister Mary Cynthia since she joined the order and is very passionate about her work in Poplar. In Series 5 Episode 3, it is revealed that Sister Winifred is missing teaching and takes a temporary job teaching a class replacing one of her patients who was fired due to pregnancy. In Episode 4 she has returned to midwifery. In Series 6 she sets about learning to drive with Phyllis' help. She leaves Nonnatus house in Series 8 after finding her new calling at the motherhouse, working with the children at the orphanage.

=== Valerie Dyer ===
Valerie Dyer
- Call The Midwife character
- Portrayed by: Jennifer Kirby
- Duration: 2017– 2020
- First appearance: Series 6, Episode 2
- Last appearance: Series 9, Episode 8
- Introduced by: Heidi Thomas
In-universe information
- Occupation: Nurse, midwife
- Grandmothers: Elsie Dyer
- Aunts: Jean Florrie
- First cousins: Maureen
- Other relatives: Warren

Valerie first appears following an explosion in Episode 2 of Series 6 coming to the aid of Shelagh following a fire in the docks. She was an Army nurse, but resigned her commission when she grew weary of the routine nature of such nursing. A native of Poplar, she took a barmaid job while sorting out her ambitions.

In Episode 4, she becomes a midwife at the Nonnatus House. Sister Monica Joan somehow recognises Valerie as having been a baby whom she delivered. Valerie faces a difficult start to the profession, delivering the baby of a woman who had experienced female genital mutilation, creating a difficult situation that ends in a hospital admission.

In Series 8, Valerie is shocked to discover that her grandmother, Elsie, is responsible for a series of back-street abortions which have been carried out recently, leading to at least one death. Elsie is sentenced to six years in prison.

In series 9, episode 6, Valerie's cousin Maureen gives birth to her third child, but her joy proves to be short-lived when her newborn son is diagnosed with a series of life-limiting conditions, due to German measles/rubella in pregnancy.

Also in series 9, Valerie's grandmother, Elsie, becomes unwell in prison and is diagnosed with terminal cancer of the oesophagus. Elsie is released from prison to spend her last days at home and Sister Julienne grants Valerie a leave of absence to be with her gran during her final days. Elsie persuades Valerie to get herself an ice cream cone, leaving her gran in the care of her colleague Nurse Anderson and mechanic Cyril Robinson. By the time Valerie returns, Elsie has died.

In the 2020 Christmas Special, Sister Julienne reveals that, following her grandmother's death, Valerie attempted to hand in her resignation, but was persuaded to work at the Hope Clinic in South Africa (from the 2016 Christmas Special).

=== Lucille Robinson (née Anderson) ===
Lucille Robinson
- Call The Midwife character
- Portrayed by: Leonie Elliott
- Duration: 2018–2023
- First appearance: Series 7, Episode 1
- Last appearance: Series 12, Episode 2
In-universe information
- Occupation: Nurse, midwife
- Sisters: Celine
- Husband: Cyril Robinson (1966–

Nurse Anderson arrives at Nonnatus House in Series 7 as their first black nurse. She comes from Jamaica and greatly misses her family and community. She studied nursing and midwifery for four years in Taunton, England before joining Nonnatus. She often faces racial discrimination, but receives support from her fellow midwives. Nurse Anderson is religious, joining a local Black house church after finding a larger, White-majority congregation unwelcoming of her "kind". She sometimes expresses prudishness, such as when Nurse Dyer asks for her assistance with a sex education class, but she ultimately shows tolerance for the changing times and environment.

In Series 8, Lucille begins a relationship with a mechanic named Cyril and he proposes in series 10.

She marries Cyril Robinson in the 2021 Christmas Special.

In Series 11, Lucille moves in with Cyril and Lucille realises she is pregnant. However, Lucille miscarries while working at the maternity home. Lucille returns to work soon after, but Shelagh realises that she is struggling to be around babies, so convinces Sister Julienne to move Lucille to district work.

In series 12, Lucille and Cyril try again to conceive but do not succeed. Lucille is further saddened when she receives pictures from Lucille’s sister Celine’s wedding to a man called Edwin who she'd never met due to her time away from Jamaica. The problems Lucille and Cyril face in England are made worse when MP Enoch Powell makes his “Rivers of Blood speech”. Lucille leaves a delivery after the mother makes racist comments about a more critical case being prioritised for the delivery room. Cyril takes some money out of their house savings to pay for Lucille to take a trip back to Jamaica.

After Cyril is injured when trying to restrain a mentally ill man, he phones Lucille in Jamaica, but her sister reveals that Lucille is at work hence will be staying for at least six months. Cyril flies to Jamaica to visit Lucille.

In Series 14, Cyril visits Lucille again and confirms the pair will be getting divorced.

=== Sister Hilda ===
Sister Hilda
- Call The Midwife character
- Portrayed by: Fenella Woolgar
- Duration: 2018–2022
- First appearance: Series 8, Episode 0
- Last appearance: Series 11, Episode 8
- Introduced by: Heidi Thomas
In-universe information
- Occupation: Nun, midwife and nurse

Sister Hilda is a new nun at Nonnatus House. Middle-class, loquacious and good-humoured, Sister Hilda puts people at ease. She can make tactless comments, but she is quick to apologise.

An experienced midwife, she worked and lived in the East End during the Blitz in the WAAFS, but has not been back for 20 years and is surprised at the changes to the area.

Sister Hilda returns to the Mother House between Series 11 and 12.

Sister Hilda appears in Series 14, Episode 8 when Sister Julienne visits the Mother House for Sister Catherine's vows.

=== Sister Frances ===
Sister Frances
- Call The Midwife character
- Portrayed by: Ella Bruccoleri
- Duration: 2018–2022
- First appearance: Series 8, Episode 0
- Last appearance: Series 12, Episode 0
- Introduced by: Heidi Thomas
In-universe information
- Occupation: Nun, midwife and nurse

Sister Frances is a novice and newly qualified midwife in her early 20s. Growing up in Harrogate in a Methodist family, her parents were deeply saddened when, at a young age, Frances announced that she was joining an Anglican order, sparking a family rift. Her father is an insurance salesman/broker, affording a roomy semi-detached house for the family home.

Sister Frances attended the local grammar school and then went directly onto her Nursing/Midwifery course on leaving. Before joining Nonnatus House, she was at the Mother House working in the orphanage. She is timid and naïve, with an eagerness to please, and demonstrates a humble obedience to the Order. She is crippled by a severe lack of confidence, but grows more confident with Sister Julienne's gentle nurturing.

In the Christmas Special preceding Series 12, Sister Frances falls off her bike and injures her shoulder, so is sent to the Mother House to recover.

=== Matthew Aylward ===
Sir Matthew Aylward, Bt
- Call The Midwife character
- Portrayed by: Olly Rix
- Duration: 2021–2024
- First appearance: Series 10, Episode 1
- Last appearance: Series 13, Episode 8
- Introduced by: Heidi Thomas
In-universe information
- Occupation: Property Developer
- Father: Sir Brigham Aylward
- Mother: Lavinia, Lady Aylward
- Wife: Fiona Aylward Beatrix Aylward
- Sons: Jonathan Aylward

Matthew Aylward is introduced in Series 10 as the husband of expectant wife Fiona, who is due to give birth at a private clinic, to which Trixie has been seconded. Trixie helps deliver Matthew and Fiona's son, Jonathon "Jonty" Aylward.

Not long after the birth of their son, Fiona is diagnosed with acute leukaemia and died, leaving Matthew a widower and a grieving new father. Trixie supports Matthew and their friendship grows. In recognition of this support, Matthew becomes a benefactor to Nonnatus House, using his wealth and influence to support the community.

During Series 11, Trixie and Matthew continue to become closer and their relationship blossoms into romance. The series concludes with their engagement.

In preparation for the wedding, Matthew's father visits but suffers from a suspected pulmonary embolism and dies. This triggers Matthew’s inheritance of the Aylward baronetcy.

Series 12 concludes with Matthew and Trixie's wedding.

Series 13 sees Matthew’s fortunes rapidly turn. Mismanagement and risky investments lead to huge debts and he is removed from Aylward Estates’ board. Consequently, his salary is halted and bailiffs seize his car. This strains his marriage with Trixie, including harsh comments about her continued work.

Without consulting Trixie, Matthew arranges a business venture in New York. He departs with Jonty, proposing she join them. Trixie declines and instead splits her time between Poplar and New York.

=== Anne "Nancy" Noble ===
Nancy Noble
- Call The Midwife character
- Portrayed by: Megan Cusack
- Duration: 2020–2025
- First appearance: Series 10, Episode 4
- Last appearance: Series 14, Episode 8
- Introduced by: Heidi Thomas
In-universe information
- Occupation: Midwife and nurse
- Mother: Aileen Corrigan
- Husband: Roger Noble (November 1970-)
- Daughters: Colette Corrigan/Noble Melinda Noble

Pupil Midwife Anne "Nancy" Noble (nee. Corrigan) is an Irish midwife in training from Cork in her early 20s and is delivered to Nonnatus House by two Catholic nuns. At the dinner table, she reveals everyone calls her "Nancy" after Nancy Sinatra, explaining she wears a lot of boots (referencing Sintra's then-popular "These Boots Are Made for Walkin'").

She is not particularly accomplished at her studies, has a tendency not to filter her thoughts, resulting in a blunt bedside manner but has a big heart. In time she learns to be more compassionate but not without occasional lapses where she puts her foot in it. She has a distinctive bright 1960s dress sense, is funny and enthusiastic, bringing a breath of fresh air to Nonnatus, but is often a worry to Sister Julienne as she frequently fails to conform. But in spite of concerns and misgivings from the congregation, she graduates as a Midwife and joins the district roster. She strikes up a good relationship with Sister Frances.

It's later revealed that her 'sister' Colette, whom she visits regularly in a nearby orphanage, is actually her illegitimate daughter to whom she eventually reveals her true relationship and has ambitions to eventually reunite fully with her and find them their own home together.

Nancy is involved in the train crash when returning from the midwifery conference, having taken Shelagh's place. She is unharmed.

In series 12, Nancy treats Colette to a TV and new dress, but it is more than Nancy can afford and the TV gets taken back. Phyllis helps Nancy learn to budget so her and Colette can get closer to affording a place of their own.

Nancy is chief bridesmaid at Trixie's wedding.

Colette moves in with Nancy by moving into Nonnatus House in 1968.

When nursing the Chdozie family, Nancy notices the similarities between their tuberculosis symptoms and her late mother's. Miss Higgins traces ex-catholic nun Kathleen Flanagan, who raised Nancy. Nancy learns that her mother did have tuberculosis, as did many members of her family. Nancy demands that Colette have the BCG vaccination early.

In the Christmas special 2024, Nancy meets Roger Noble, a pharmaceutical salesman, at GP surgery when he is waiting to meet Dr Turner. He asks Nancy to the fair. The pair continue their relationship and get engaged in Series 14, Episode 1. Following their engagement, Nancy meets Roger's mother, her future mother-in-law.

Nancy moves away when she gets a new job with accommodation, in preparation for her marriage to Roger Noble.

In series 14, Nancy marries Rodger Noble and gives birth to her second child.

== Previous recurring characters ==
=== James "Jimmy" Wilson ===
James Wilson
- Call The Midwife character
- Portrayed by: George Rainsford
- Duration: 2012–2013
- First appearance: Series 1, Episode 3
- Last appearance: Series 2, Episode 8
In-universe information
- Other names: Jimmy
- Wife: Francine
- Daughters: Caroline

Jimmy is an old friend of Jenny's. In Series 1, Jimmy is madly in love with Jenny, even though she still pines for the married man, the reason she escaped to London. Jenny convinces Jimmy they are "just friends" and he stops pursuing her. In Series 2, the tables are turned when Jimmy returns, having graduated school and now working as a municipal surveyor/architect. Jenny sees Jimmy as a grown man for the first time which instantly turns her head, but unfortunately she discovers that Jimmy is engaged to pregnant Francine, whom Jenny met at the prenatal clinic. Jimmy and Francine marry and have a baby, Caroline.

=== Jane Sutton ===
Jane Sutton
- Call The Midwife character
- Portrayed by: Dorothy Atkinson
- Duration: 2013
- First appearance: Series 2, Episode 3
- Last appearance: Series 2, Episode 8
In-universe information
- Occupation: Auxiliary Nurse

Jane is the medical orderly at Nonnatus House. She arrives to fill in for Chummy while she's in Africa. Jane is very shy and does not talk unless it is necessary. We later find out the reason for her being shy—her parents sent her to an asylum when she was young, leaving her with no self-esteem. Throughout the series, she grows in confidence and makes friends with her fellow nurses. She also finds love with Reverend Applebee-Thornton (Jason Watkins), a local Anglican priest. She does not return for Series 3, with a deleted scene from the 2013 Christmas special explaining that she has gone to nursing school.

=== Alec Jesmond ===
Alec Jesmond
- Call The Midwife character
- Portrayed by: Leo Staar
- Duration: 2013-2014
- First appearance: Series 2, Episode 8
- Last appearance: Series 3, Episode 4
In-universe information
- Occupation: Architect

Alec is a friend of Jimmy's who develops romantic feelings for Jenny. They eventually start dating after a long period in which Jenny continues to mourn her loss of Jimmy, but who encourages her to enjoy life and Alec. Alec and Jenny eventually date, but Jenny's abundant caution about affairs of the heart leads to a misunderstanding and argument. Castigating his co-worker in anger, Alec falls through an old staircase in the building they are renovating. In the hospital, his foot is amputated and he seems to be recovering. He later dies, thought to be because of a blood clot in his wounded leg, and his funeral is attended by a distraught Jenny and the other midwives and the nuns.

=== Lady Browne ===
Lady Browne
- Call The Midwife character
- Portrayed by: Cheryl Campbell
- Duration: 2012-2014
- First appearance: Series 1, Episode 6
- Last appearance: Series 3, Episode 8
In-universe information
- Husband: Sir Rex
- Children: Camilla Noakes

Lady Browne is Chummy's upper-class, snobby mother. She lived in Madeira. In Series 1, she is featured in the series finale before Chummy and Peter's wedding. She moves to Poplar in 1959, after separating from Chummy's father, and is diagnosed with cancer by Dr Turner. She dies peacefully in Chummy and Peter's bed in the Series 3 finale.

=== Mrs. Busby ===
Mrs. Busby
- Call The Midwife character
- Portrayed by: Maxine Evans
- Duration: 2015-2016
- First appearance: Series 4, Episode 8
- Last appearance: Series 5, Episode 8
In-universe information
- Children: Delia Busby

Mrs. Busby is the mother of Delia Busby. Her first appearance is when Delia is in hospital in the series finale of Series 4; she is also seen in the 1960 Christmas special, Series 5, Episode 1 and the series finale of Series 5. She is still not happy that Delia has decided to stay in Poplar at the convent. She also seems not to accept her decision to become a midwife and doesn't really like Patsy. It is clear that, by the end of Series 5, she is aware of Delia's and Patsy's relationship and does not approve.

=== Sister Ursula ===
Sister Ursula
- Call The Midwife character
- Portrayed by: Harriet Walter
- Duration: 2017
- First appearance: Series 6, Episode 1
- Last appearance: Series 6, Episode 4
In-universe information
- Occupation: Sister-in-charge, nun, midwife and nurse

Sister Ursula arrives to replace Sister Julienne when a group of Nonnatans go to South Africa, as the new sister-in-charge, in 1962. She appears to have a strict running form when the staff return, clashing with Shelagh over the way clinic is run and the behaviour of Sister Monica Joan. Patsy and Delia appear to be keen for her to return to the mother house. She orders Sister Mary Cynthia to return to the mother house, before being informed of her assault. She returns to the mother house after she is deemed unfit to run Nonnatus House.

=== Christopher Dockerill ===
Christopher Dockerill
- Call The Midwife character
- Portrayed by: Jack Hawkins
- Duration: 2017–2018
- First appearance: Series 6, Episode 5
- Last appearance: Series 7, Episode 5
In-universe information
- Occupation: Dentist
- Wife: Moira (divorced)
- Daughters: Alexandra Dockerill

Dockerill is introduced in Series 6, when Trixie escorts a female patient, who has a phobia of dentists, to see him. After carrying out work on the woman, which brings on her labour whilst in theatre, Trixie is forced to deliver the baby with his assistance. Later, Trixie believes him to be seeing another woman after he cancels a number of dates, but he tells her he has been looking after his daughter from a previous marriage.

Trixie breaks off their relationship when Christopher reveals that Alexandra has been struggling since his divorce from her mother, Moira. Christopher is last seen driving Trixie to the airport to visit her godmother.

=== Sergeant Woolf ===
Aubrey Woolf
- Call The Midwife character
- Portrayed by: Trevor Cooper
- Duration: 2017–20
- First appearance: Series 7, Episode 0
- Last appearance: Series 9, Episode 2
In-universe information
- Occupation: Police Sergeant

Sergeant Woolf first appears in the 2017 Christmas special. He and Nurse Crane meet and take a bit of a dislike to each other after Sergeant Woolf complains about Phyllis's car and makes her cubs take an igloo they'd built. Later in the series, Sergeant Woolf is shown to have more compassion when he helps postpone demolition works while Nurse Crane cares for a dying woman.

In series 8, Sergeant Woolf volunteers to help Phyllis with the cubs. He has previous experience volunteering with a pack in Stepney, so Phyllis agrees to a trial period. Together, Phyllis and Sergeant Woolf convince Violet, in her role as councillor, to allow for a sand pit and paddling pool to be set up outside Nonnatus House, for the Bank Holiday Monday. Subsequently, he asks Phyllis to a photography exhibition, trying to impress her despite not having an interest in photography. When Sergeant Woolf attempts to make plans for further time together, Nurse Crane makes it clear she isn't interested. When Phyllis is hospitalised due to a trapped sciatic nerve, Sergeant Woolf spends time with Miss Higgins and is impressed with her skills as a poetess. Consequently, Miss Higgins and Sergeant Woolf go to a fundraising event together.

Also in series 8, Sergeant Woolf is part of the investigation into illegal abortion. This includes the death of Trixie's friend Jeanie and the arrest and trial of Valerie's grandmother Elsie.

In series 9, Miss Higgins and Sergeant Woolf continue to get to know one another. However, their blossoming relationship is cut short when Sergeant Woolf has a heart attack. Although he survives, he moves away to live with his sister and terminates the relationship.

=== Mother Mildred ===
Mother Mildred
- Call The Midwife character
- Portrayed by: Miriam Margolyes
- Duration: 2018–21
- First appearance: Series 8, Episode 0
- Last appearance: Series 11, Episode 0
In-universe information
- Occupation: Nun

Sister Mildred first appears in the 2018 Christmas Special. She arrives at Nonnatus House with four orphans from Hong Kong. She was supposed to be headed straight to the Mother House, but fog hampered her journey.

When Mother Jesu Emmanuel, the Mother Superior of the order, is diagnosed with a brain tumour, Sister Mildred is voted in a her successor. Mother Mildred requests that Sister Winifred remain at the Mother House with her to help run the orphanage.

Mother Mildred oversees Sister Frances' vows, then assigns Sister Hilda and Sister Frances to Nonnatus House to fill the gap left by Sister Winifred.

Later in Series 8, Mother Mildred returns to Nonnatus House to support after Nurse Crane injured her back.

In the 2019 Christmas Special, Mother Mildred feels a calling to open another branch house; this time in the Outer Hebrides. She convinces Dr and Mrs Turner, Sister Julienne, Trixie, Valerie and Lucille to join her. However, the religious clash between the Anglican order and the Presbyterian faith of the locals, among other things, leads Mother Mildred to conclude it was not right to expand.

Mother Mildred stays at Nonnatus House for a short time after the team's return from the Outer Hebrides. During this time, after baby Primrose is found in a bin, Mother Mildred visits Catholic Father Duncombe, who'd fathered his housekeeper's daughter. He had encouraged Brenda, Primrose's mother, to give her up for adoption. Instead, Mother Mildred arranges for Brenda and Primrose to go to the Mother House together. Mother Mildred returns to the Mother House along with them.

Mother Mildred visits Nonnatus House again in the 2021 Christmas Special, to celebrate Christmas with the sisters. Her expertise from Hong Kong is useful when a baby was born to a mother addicted to heroin.

=== Colette Noble ===
Colette Noble
- Call The Midwife character
- Portrayed by: Francesca Fullilove
- Duration: 2021–2025
- First appearance: Series 6, Episode 8
- Last appearance: Series 14, Episode 8
- Introduced by: Heidi Thomas
In-universe information
- Mother: Nancy Noble
- Stepfather: Roger Noble (1970-)
- Sisters: Melinda Noble

Colette Noble (née Corrigan) is the firstborn daughter of Nancy.

Colette is first introduced as Nancy's younger sister, whom she visited regularly in a nearby orphanage.

After Nancy discovers that Colette is being mistreated in the orphanage, Nancy and Colette attempt to run away together, but Nancy has insufficient funds to support them. Sister Juilenne agrees to let Nancy continue working at Nonnatus House and Colette goes to live with foster carers.

It is later revealed that Colette is actually her illegitimate daughter to whom she eventually reveals her true relationship and has ambitions to eventually reunite fully with her and find them their own home together.

Colette later moves into Nonnatus House in 1968.

Colette moves away when Nancy gets a new job with accommodation, in preparation for Nancy's marriage to Roger Noble. In Series 14, Episode 8, Colette gains a step-father, Roger Noble, when her mother gets married and a half-sister, Melinda Noble, after her mother gives birth just before the wedding.

=== Roger Noble ===
Roger Noble
- Call The Midwife character
- Portrayed by: Conor O'Donnell
- Duration: 2024–2025
- First appearance: Series 14, Episode 0
- Last appearance: Series 14, Episode 8
- Introduced by: Heidi Thomas
In-universe information
- Occupation: Pharmaceutical Salesman
- Mother: Esther Noble
- Wife: Nancy Noble (1970-)
- Daughters: Colette Noble Melinda Noble

Roger Noble is first introduced in the Christmas special 2024. He is a pharmaceutical salesman who was hoping to meet with Dr Turner as part of his job. While waiting, he meets Nancy Corrigan. He asks Nancy to the fair. The pair continue their relationship and get engaged in Series 14, Episode 1, following which Nancy meets Roger's mother, her future mother-in-law.

At the end of series 14, Rodger Noble marries Nancy and she gives birth to their daughter.
