= Summer of Rockets =

2019 television drama series

- Genre: Drama
- Screenplay by: Stephen Poliakoff
- Directed by: Stephen Poliakoff
- Starring: Keeley Hawes; Linus Roache; Timothy Spall; Toby Stephens
- Country of origin: United Kingdom
- Original language: English
- No. of series: 1
- No. of episodes: 6

Production
- Executive producers: Helen Flint; Lucy Richer
- Production locations: London, England; Oxford, England
- Running time: 60 minutes
- Production company: Little Island Productions

Original release
- Network: BBC Two; BBC Two HD
- Release: 22 May – 26 June 2019

Summer of Rockets is a six-episode British Cold War television drama, which premiered on BBC Two in the United Kingdom on 22 May 2019. The series was written and directed by Stephen Poliakoff and stars Keeley Hawes, Linus Roache, Timothy Spall and Toby Stephens. It is a semi-autobiographical story based on Poliakoff's childhood and his father, Alexander Poliakoff.

== Plot ==
Samuel Petrukhin, a Russian-born Jewish inventor living in England, is given a secret mission by MI5. Samuel, who specialises in the development of hearing aids, is asked to use his expertise to contribute to western Cold War efforts. Following the tensions of the Space Race and the first hydrogen bomb test, Samuel's work plays a part in the emergence of the modern world.

== Cast ==
- Toby Stephens as Samuel Petrukhin
- Keeley Hawes as Kathleen Shaw
- Timothy Spall as Lord Arthur Wallington
- Linus Roache as Richard Shaw MP
- Lily Sacofsky as Hannah Petrukhin
- Toby Woolf as Sasha Petrukhin
- Lucy Cohu as Miriam Petrukhin
- Gary Beadle as Courtney Johnson
- Mark Bonnar as Field
- Suanne Braun as Matron Jeffry
- Ronald Pickup as Walter
- Rose Ayling-Ellis as Esther
- Greg Austin as Anthony Shaw
- Jordan Coulson as Kevin
- Matthew James Thomas as Nicolas Halliday
- Fode Simbo as Joel
- Claire Bloom as Aunt Mary
- Leo Staar as Denning
- Adrian Edmondson as Max Dennis

== Episodes ==
No.	Title	Directed by	Written by	Original release date	UK viewers (millions)
1	"Episode 1"	Stephen Poliakoff	Stephen Poliakoff	22 May 2019	2.76
In the summer of 1958, hearing-aid manufacturer Samuel Petrukhin is preparing to launch his revolutionary new invention. His family become involved with the mysterious Shaw family, while his daughter Hannah participates in the final London debutante season.
2	"Episode 2"	Stephen Poliakoff	Stephen Poliakoff	29 May 2019	1.99
Samuel is given a mission by MI5, and the Shaws hold a village fete in their garden. Kathleen reveals to Hannah that her son, Anthony, has been missing for five years. Hannah volunteers at a civil defence training drill for responding to a nuclear strike.
3	"Episode 3"	Stephen Poliakoff	Stephen Poliakoff	5 June 2019	1.74
Samuel continues to spy on the Shaws. Kathleen visits Sasha at his boarding school, and increases her attempts to locate Anthony. Hannah's subterfuge is exposed, and she spends more time with Esther, one of Samuel's employees.
4	"Episode 4"	Stephen Poliakoff	Stephen Poliakoff	12 June 2019	1.83
Samuel expresses his doubts over his mission. Kathleen pursues her lead. Sasha is caught searching for information about Anthony, and runs away from his school.
5	"Episode 5"	Stephen Poliakoff	Stephen Poliakoff	19 June 2019	1.52
Samuel is shot, and after his recovery insists his family go into hiding separately. Esther helps Kathleen to discover a clue to Anthony's concealed passion, leading her to a country hotel. Samuel becomes involved in a conspiracy.
6	"Episode 6"	Stephen Poliakoff	Stephen Poliakoff	26 June 2019	1.38
Anthony denies his identity. Samuel is tasked with exposing the conspiracy, but is preempted by a comedy sketch. Hannah holds a party.

== Production ==
=== Development ===
Summer of Rockets was originally announced in May 2017 alongside two other BBC commissions, which were 2017's Little Women and 2018's A Very English Scandal. In May 2018, Keeley Hawes, Toby Stephens, Timothy Spall and Linus Roache were announced as joining the project.

=== Filming ===
Filming began in Oxford and in London in May 2018. Filming also took place in Stevenage, Hertfordshire in July 2018 at Benington Lordship, and at Reddam House, Berkshire in August. Filming also took place at The Royal Masonic School for Girls in Rickmansworth, Hertfordshire in August 2018 and at the former RAF Upper Heyford air base in Oxfordshire.

The streets outside the Ropery at the Chatham Dockyard in Kent were used to film the 1950s civil defence exercise in the series and the upper floors of the Ropery itself featured as civil defence training rooms.

== Reception ==
Writing for The Guardian, Emine Saner gave the first episode four stars out of five. The Times gave it three stars out of five, praising the production but found it inconsistently engaging. The Evening Standard found the episode 'hammy' but complimented the acting and mystery.
