= Leo Staar =

English actor

- Born: 24 July 1986 (age 40); London, England
- Occupation: Actor
- Years active: 2009 – present
- Television: Call the Midwife, Maigret
- Children: 1

Leo Staar (born 24 July 1986) is an English actor, best known for his portrayals of Alec Jesmond in Call the Midwife and Inspector Lapointe in Maigret.

== Biography ==
Leo Staar was born in London and grew up in Worthing, West Sussex. After graduating from drama school in 2009, he went straight into theatre, playing the roles of Ferdinand in The Tempest and Benvolio in Romeo and Juliet in the Cambridge Shakespeare Festival. He also played Mr. Wickham in a stage adaptation of Pride and Prejudice. In 2010, he appeared in Thea Sharrock's production of Terence Rattigan's After the Dance, alongside Benedict Cumberbatch at the National Theatre. That same year, he played a minor role in the National Theatre Live cinema broadcast of Sir Nicholas Hynter's production of Hamlet, with Rory Kinnear in the title role. In 2011, he appeared in Josie Rourke's production of Much Ado About Nothing at Wyndham's Theatre, alongside David Tennant and Catherine Tate.

Staar became known to the public in 2013 when he landed his first major television role in the BBC medical drama Call the Midwife, where he played the recurring character Alec Jesmond, who became the boyfriend of main character Jenny Lee. He appeared in six episodes until the character died in a tragic accident. He then made guest appearances on Casualty, Lewis and Death in Paradise.

In 2015, Staar landed his next major television role when he was cast as Inspector Lapointe in the ITV detective drama Maigret, based on the books by Georges Simenon and starring Rowan Atkinson in the title role. The series ran from 2016 to 2017. In 2019, he played Denning in the BBC mini-series Summer of Rockets, opposite Toby Stephens and Keeley Hawes. He appeared in Fabio D'Andrea's music video The Sleeping Beauty, where he played a widowed father whose young daughter dreams of becoming a ballerina. The video was officially released in 2020.

In 2022, Staar appeared in the spy movie, The 355, opposite Jessica Chastain, Lupita Nyong'o, Penélope Cruz and Sebastian Stan.

== Filmography ==
=== Film ===
Year	Title	Role	Notes
2011	An Outstanding Performer	Charlie	Short film
2019	Cheating Charlie	Volker	Short Film
2022	The 355	Grady	

=== Television ===
Year	Title	Role	Notes
2012	Dark Matters: Twisted But True	Ed Forman/Krasnogorskiy	2 episodes
2013	Dancing on the Edge	Young Upper Class Man	1 episode
2013-2014	Call the Midwife	Alec Jesmond	6 episodes
2014	Casualty	Will Jamison	Episode: "To Yourself Be True"
2014	Lewis	Simon Eastwood	Episodes: "Entry Wounds parts 1&2"
2015	Death in Paradise	Simon Parke	Episode: "Til Death Do You Part"
2016	Maigret Sets a Trap	Inspector Lapointe	TV film
2016	Maigret's Dead Man	Inspector Lapointe	TV film
2017	Maigret's Night at the Crossroads	Inspector Lapointe	TV film
2017	Maigret in Montemartre	Inspector Lapointe	TV film
2018	Jack Ryan	Williams	Episode: "Pilot"
2019	Summer of Rockets	Denning	5 episodes
2022	Van der Valk	Florian Barby	Episode: "Blood in Amsterdam"
2023	Silent Witness	Calvin Dunn	Episodes: "Effective Range - Part 1&2"

=== Live Streaming Theatre ===
Year	Title	Role	Notes
2010	National Theatre Live Hamlet	Cornelius/Priest	Live via satellite

=== Music videos ===
Year	Artist	Title	Role
2020	Fabio D'Andrea	The Sleeping Beauty	The Father

=== Audio ===
Year	Title	Role	Notes
2020	The Avengers: Steed and Mrs Peel	Jack/Agent Rogers/Rocliffe	Comic Strip Audio

=== Video games ===
Year	Title	Role
2014	Dreamfall Chapters	Reza Temiz (voice)

== Theatre ==
Year	Title	Role	Notes
2009	The Tempest	Ferdinand	Cambridge Shakespeare Festival
2009	Romeo and Juliet	Benvolio	Cambridge Shakespeare Festival
2009	Pride and Prejudice	Mr Wickham	Theatre Royal, Bath
2010	After the Dance	Partygoer/Dr George Banner/Cyril Carter	Royal National Theatre
2010	Hamlet	Cornelius/Priest	Royal National Theatre
2011	Much Ado About Nothing	Messenger	Wyndham's Theatre
2012	Celebrity Night at Café Red	Harry	Trafalgar Theatre
2015	Hello/Goodbye	Leo	Hampstead Theatre
2018	The Country Wife	Harcourt	Southwark Playhouse
