= Lily Sacofsky =

English actress

- Born: 12 July 1994 (age 32); Manchester, England
- Education: Guildhall School of Music and Drama
- Years active: 2015–present

Lily Sacofsky (born 12 July 1994) is an English actress. She is known for her roles in the BBC Two miniseries Summer of Rockets (2019), the ITV period drama Sanditon (2019–2022), and the crime drama McDonald & Dodds (2021–2022), also on ITV.

== Early life ==
Sacofsky was born in Manchester to parents Ruth, from a Midlands coal-mining family, and Julian, from a Northern England Jewish family. Lily attended Levenshulme high school for girls She graduated with a Bachelor of Arts in Acting from the Guildhall School of Music and Drama in 2015.

== Filmography ==
Year	Title	Role	Notes
2017	Bancroft	Laura Fraser	Series 1
2019	Summer of Rockets	Hannah Petrukhin	Miniseries
2019–2022	Sanditon	Clara Brereton	Main role, Series 1–2
2021–2022	McDonald & Dodds	DC Milena Paciorkowski	Series 2–3
2021	Dalgliesh	Lady Barbara Berowne	"A Taste for Death"
2023	World on Fire	Pearl	2 episodes

== Stage ==
Year	Title	Role	Notes
2015	Three Days in the Country	Vera	National Theatre, London
2016	The Mighty Walzer	Lorna Peachey	Royal Exchange, Manchester
2024	Uncle Vanya	Elena	Orange Tree Theatre, Richmond
