= McDonald & Dodds =

British crime drama television series

- Genre: Crime drama Mystery
- Created by: Robert Murphy
- Starring: Tala Gouveia; Jason Watkins; James Murray; Claire Skinner; Pearl Chanda; Lily Sacofsky; Jack Riddiford; Danyal Ismail; Charlie Chambers; Bhavik C. Pankhania
- Composer: Blair Mowat
- Country of origin: United Kingdom
- Original language: English
- No. of series: 4
- No. of episodes: 11

Production
- Executive producers: Preethi Mavahalli; Damien Timmer
- Producer: Amy Thurgood
- Production locations: Bath, Somerset, England
- Running time: 90 minutes
- Production companies: Mammoth Screen; ITV Studios; BritBox

Original release
- Network: ITV
- Release: 1 March 2020 – 4 August 2024

McDonald & Dodds is a British television crime drama series created and principally written by screenwriter Robert Murphy. The series comprises a pair of mismatched detectives who solve crimes around Bath and the surrounding region. It stars Tala Gouveia as DCI Lauren McDonald, a streetwise former Metropolitan Police investigator who arrives in Bath to head up the Avon and Somerset Police Criminal Investigation Department; and Jason Watkins as DS Dodds, a shy and modest investigator who has not seen street action in more than ten years.

Originally commissioned under the working title Invisible, a pair of films were shot during the summer of 2019, which make up the basis of the first series, broadcast in March 2020. Strong viewing figures saw a second series commissioned for 2021 and shown in February 2021. A third series was confirmed later and broadcast in June 2022. In March 2023, ITV announced that the show was renewed for a fourth series, which was scheduled to air in the UK in April 2024 but was delayed due to scheduling conflicts. Series 4 began airing in the UK on 21 July 2024. Series 4 began airing in Denmark on 20 March 2024 and in the United States on 23 May 2024. On 16 January 2025, the drama was cancelled after four series due to a decline in ratings.

== Production ==
The first series featured an ensemble line-up of guest stars including actors Robert Lindsay, Hugh Dennis, Freddie Fox, and Joanna Scanlan. The second series, which began in February 2021, was again headed by an all-star guest cast, led by Rob Brydon, whose role was used to heavily promote the series in the run-up to its broadcast.

The final episode of the second series, The War of the Rose, was made available to watch on BritBox services outside of the UK. By June 2022, the episode had still not been broadcast in the UK, despite having been released on DVD in Germany, Australia, and the United States. Subsequently, it was announced that the episode would instead air as if it were the third episode of Series 3 in the UK. Due to the casting changes between series, running this episode third in Series 3 would have created a continuity problem, so it was decided to reshoot James Murray's scenes with Claire Skinner instead. This means there are two versions of the episode in circulation: the international version with Murray as the Chief Super, and the UK version with Skinner as the Chief Super.

Filming on the third series took place in late 2021, with Skinner joining the cast as Chief Superintendent Mary Ormond, following the departure of Murray. Guest stars announced for this series include Alan Davies, Sian Phillips, Paul McGann, and Kelvin Fletcher.

The fourth and final series began filming at the end of June 2023 with Bhavik C. Pankhania joining the cast as DC Lee and guest stars announced for this series include Lydia Leonard, Daniel Lapaine, Ace Bhatti, John Gordon Sinclair, Dipo Ola, Toby Stephens and Pixie Lott.

The title sequence for the show (from Series 2) features a question mark (which transforms into the title's ampersand), referencing the iconic overhead view of Royal Crescent and The Circus, two listed structures in Bath that are frequently shown on screen.

== Cast ==
=== Main ===
- Tala Gouveia as DCI Lauren McDonald (series 1–4)
- Jason Watkins as DS Dodds (series 1–4)
- James Murray as Chief Superintendent John Houseman (series 1–2)
- Claire Skinner as Chief Superintendent Mary Ormond (series 3–4)
- Jack Riddiford as DC Darren Craig (series 1–2)
- Pearl Chanda as DC Laura Simpson (series 1)
- Danyal Ismail as DC Martin Malik (series 3)
- Lily Sacofsky as DC Milena Paciorkowski (series 2–3)
- Charlie Chambers as DC Samuel Goldie (series 3–4)
- Bhavik C. Pankhania as DC Lee (series 4)

=== Guest ===
==== Series 1 ====
- Robert Lindsay
- Caroline Catz
- Joanna Scanlan
- Hugh Dennis

==== Series 2 ====
- Rob Brydon
- Cathy Tyson
- Martin Kemp
- Patsy Kensit
- Rupert Graves
- Sharon Rooney
- John Thomson

==== Series 3 ====
- Alan Davies
- Sian Phillips
- Catherine Tyldesley
- Kelvin Fletcher
- Paul McGann
- Rosie Day
- Rhashan Stone
- Emily Joyce
- Saira Choudhry
- Nitin Ganatra
- Sarah Parish

==== Series 4 ====
- Pixie Lott
- Ace Bhatti
- Dipo Ola
- Lydia Leonard
- Toby Stephens
- John Gordon Sinclair
- Daniel Lapaine
- Jared Garfield
- Hugh Quarshie
- Will Young
- Sophia Myles
- Charley Webb
- Jason Hughes
- Lucinda Dryzek
- Holli Dempsey
- Bill Bailey
- Joy Richardson

== Episodes ==
Series	Episodes	Originally released		Average viewers (millions)
Series	Episodes	First released	Last released	Average viewers (millions)
1	2	1 March 2020	8 March 2020	6.09
2	2	28 February 2021	7 March 2021	5.63
3	4	19 June 2022	10 July 2022	4.49
4	3	21 July 2024	4 August 2024	3.50

=== Series 1 (2020) ===
No. overall	No. in series	Title	Directed by	Written by	Original release date	UK viewers (millions)
1	1	"The Fall of the House of Crockett"	Richard Senior	Robert Murphy	1 March 2020	6.37
Wealthy entrepreneur Max Crockett (Robert Lindsay) arrives home from a weekend away to find a dead body in his hallway, and a statue worth £200,000 missing. It seems an open and shut case, with evidence pointing to a robbery gone wrong, until the victim is discovered to have a link to the Crockett family. The arrival of DCI McDonald ruffles some feathers amongst the rather sleepy team of Bath detectives.
2	2	"A Wilderness of Mirrors"	Laura Scrivano	Robert Murphy	8 March 2020	5.81
When a recent absconder from a local rehab clinic is found dead, all the events point to suicide, but DS Dodds isn't convinced. Setting out to prove his theory, he bumps heads with counsellor Kelly Mulcreevy (Joanna Scanlan). But as the web begins to unweave, the troubled inmates, a corrupt cop working on the inside and Chief Supt. Houseman all prove to be thorns in the detectives' side. Caroline Catz and Hugh Dennis are guest stars.

=== Series 2 (2021) ===
No. overall	No. in series	Title	Directed by	Written by	Original release date	UK viewers (millions)
3	1	"The Man Who Wasn't There"	Alex Pillai	Robert Murphy	28 February 2021	5.93
Five friends embark on a hot-air balloon ride over Bath – but only four land together. The other, Frankie Marsh, is found dead having fallen from the balloon some 100 ft. Was it murder, or did the victim jump? McDonald and Dodds delve deep into the history of the former 80s high-flyers and discover more than meets the eye, while Dodds is assisted by Roy Gilbert (Rob Brydon), an aviation accident investigator somehow seemingly connected to the case. Guest stars include Rupert Graves, Cathy Tyson, Martin Kemp and Patsy Kensit.
4	2	"We Need To Talk About Doreen"	Rebecca Rycroft	Robert Murphy	7 March 2021	5.32
A girls' weekend in Bath is interrupted by the discovery of a body in the Box railway tunnel – a guest of the party which the female clan attended the previous night. Evidence points towards Angela, the somewhat leader of the group, a forty-something self-proclaimed celebrity who was having an affair with the victim. Dodds thinks he has the case wrapped up, unaware that the dark horse of the group, Doreen (Sharon Rooney), is leading him a merry dance. John Thomson is a guest star.

=== Series 3 (2022) ===
- The War of the Rose was originally intended to be Series 2's finale, featuring the final appearances of James Murray as Ch. Supt. Houseman and Jack Riddiford as DC Darren Craig. Due to a scheduling conflict in the UK, the episode was moved to late on in Series 3, meaning some scenes had to be re-shot with the new characters for the purposes of continuity. However, on the streaming service Britbox, the original filming of this episode is shown as the Series 2's finale with the original cast including James Murray as Ch. Supt. Houseman.

No. overall	No. in series	Title	Directed by	Written by	Original release date	UK viewers (millions)
5	1	"Belvedere"	Robert Quinn	Robert Murphy	19 June 2022	4.38
When a young Irishwoman, Elodie Docherty, is found dead in Parade Gardens in the middle of a sunny summer's day, McDonald and Dodds are called in to figure out how and why this seemingly innocent young woman died. Their investigations lead them to a crumbling mansion on the outskirts of Bath, where they try to ascertain how linguistic anthropologist Professor George Gillan (Alan Davies) and his eccentric elderly mother Agnes (Sian Phillips) are involved with the victim. As the investigation progresses, the team discover that their prime suspect, Kate Porter (Catherine Tyldesley), is an NCA mole living under witness protection, and that the mansion may hold some personal tragedy for Dodds.
6	2	"A Billion Beats"	Isher Sahota	Rob Drummond	26 June 2022	4.38
McDonald and Dodds are sucked into the fast and furious world of Formula 1, after Bath’s famous motorsport dynasty, the Addingtons, report that their up-and-coming driver has died during a 3.14-second pit stop. As an F1 fan herself, McDonald won’t let patriarch and Team Principal Archie Addington (Paul McGann) run rings around her, but when a significant someone from her past gets dragged into the investigation, she’s thrown off course. But it’s one of Dodds’ specialisms that leads them to uncover the darker side of success and finally unravel the truth.
7	3	"The War of Rose" / "The War of the Rose"	Ian Aryeh	Kam Odedra	3 July 2022	4.63
Social media influencer Rose Boleyn (Rosie Day) elects to have plastic surgery at a clinic run by soon to be divorced couple Al (Rhashan Stone) and Mariel (Sarah Parish). After tragedy strikes, McDonald and Dodds are brought in to investigate the clinic and its staff.
8	4	"Clouds Across the Moon"	Sasha Ransome	Robert Murphy	10 July 2022	4.57
On the dawn of All Soul's Day, the body of a successful Bath businessman is found in a shallow grave in the shadow of Glastonbury Tor. The detective duo's first suspect is local artist Hector Ingham, although McDonald can't help but be suspicious of the man who found the body, the mysterious Martin Silver – IT consultant by day, medium by night – who claims to be able to speak to the dead. As increasingly cryptic clues come to light, one name keeps reoccurring in paper trails, credit card statement and on the lips of witnesses…that of Dodds himself.

=== Series 4 (2024) ===
- Series 4 was scheduled to air on ITV1 in April 2024 but was delayed due to scheduling conflicts; it was broadcast on ITV1 from 21 July 2024 to 4 August 2024.

No. overall	No. in series	Title	Directed by	Written by	Original release date	UK viewers (millions)
9	1	"The Rule of Three"	Khurrum M. Sultan	Robert Murphy	21 July 2024	4.01
Investigative journalist Susie Green is murdered during a family party. A witness claims that her stepdaughter, Lola Baker (Pixie Lott), was responsible for the death. Meanwhile, a middle-aged woman is found shot dead in an apartment in central Bath. It is later discovered that the victim, Anne Hegarty, is in fact Anne Holgate, a missing person who disappeared more than thirty eight-years ago whilst out playing with her older brother (Toby Stephens). Dropped into the shady world of organized crime, McDonald and Dodds are shocked to discover a link between Anne's death and the murder of Susie Green, while the case takes a personal turn for Chief Supt. Ormond.
10	2	"Jinxy Sings the Blues"	Samantha Harrie	Robert Murphy	28 July 2024	3.22
Local man Ian Andrews (Jared Garfield) boards the local bus heading towards Bath station. Everything appears as usual, a normal day, but when the bus rolls into Bath station, Ian is dead. To solve the mystery of Ian's fate, McDonald and Dodds delve into the early history of blues music and the shady world of art auctions. Guest stars include Hugh Quarshie, Charley Webb, Will Young and Sophia Myles.
11	3	"Wedding Fever"	Stephen Gallacher	Rob Drummond & Robert Murphy	4 August 2024	3.26
It's wedding season in Bath, but a string of suspicious deaths is affecting celebrations across the city. Is there a serial killer on the loose who goes after weddings? In a series of cryptic calls to the local radio station, an anonymous person threatens that there is a plan for more murders. Guest stars include Jason Hughes, Holli Dempsey and Lucinda Dryzek.

== Home media and streaming ==
The four series have been released onto Region 2 DVD in the UK. Further releases have taken place of the first, second and third series in France and Germany.

== Streaming ==
All four series are available for streaming in the US and Australia through the BritBox service. The fourth series started streaming weekly in Australia and the US on 23 May 2024.
