= Maigret (2016 TV series) =

British television detective series (2016–2017)

- Genre: Crime drama
- Based on: Jules Maigret by Georges Simenon
- Written by: Stewart Harcourt
- Starring: Rowan Atkinson; Lucy Cohu; Shaun Dingwall; Leo Staar; Aidan McArdle
- Composer: Samuel Sim
- Country of origin: United Kingdom
- Original language: English
- No. of series: 2
- No. of episodes: 4

Production
- Executive producers: Paul Aggett; Stewart Harcourt; Ben Latham-Jones; John Simenon; Barnaby Thompson
- Producer: Jeremy Gwilt
- Production locations: Budapest, Hungary, Szentendre, Hungary
- Running time: 90 minutes
- Production companies: Ealing Studios; Maigret Productions

Original release
- Network: ITV
- Release: 28 March 2016 – 24 December 2017

Maigret is a British television series from ITV. It is an adaptation of the books by Georges Simenon featuring his fictional French detective Jules Maigret, played by Rowan Atkinson. The series is set in France in the mid-1950s. Its first episode aired on 28 March 2016 and the second on Christmas Day, 2016. A second series (also of two episodes) aired during 2017. It was reported in 2018 that the series had been cancelled.

The series premiered in the United States on 31 August 2019 on Ovation.

Rowan Atkinson, who plays Jules Maigret, said, "I have been a devourer of the Maigret novels for many years and I'm very much looking forward to playing such an intriguing character at work in Paris during a fascinating period in its history."

== Series overview ==
Series	Episodes	Originally released	
Series	Episodes	First released	Last released
1	2	28 March 2016	25 December 2016
2	2	16 April 2017	24 December 2017

== Cast ==
- Rowan Atkinson as Chief Inspector Jules Maigret
- Lucy Cohu as Madame Maigret
- Shaun Dingwall as Inspector Janvier
- Leo Staar as Inspector Lapointe
- Mark Heap as Doctor Moers
- Hugh Simon as Dr. Paul (three episodes)
- Colin Mace as Insp. Lognon (two episodes)
- Aidan McArdle as Judge Comeliau (three episodes)

== Production ==
=== Series 1 ===
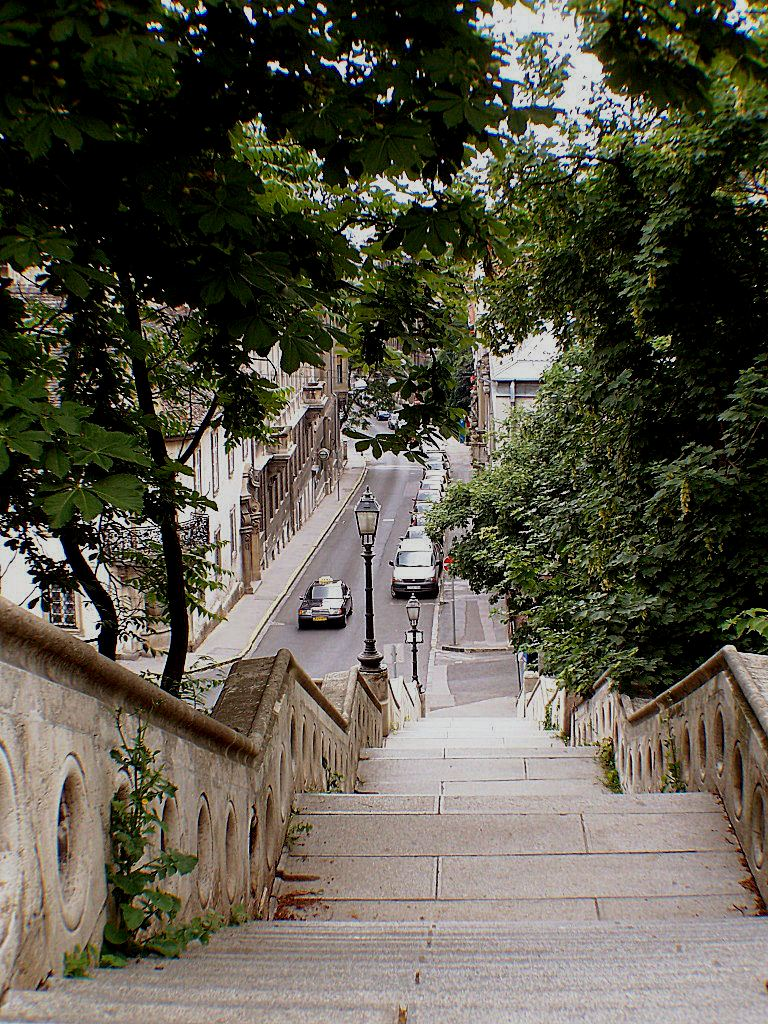
The Jezsuita Stairs in Budapest doubled as stairs in Montmartre.

The episodes were mainly filmed on location in Budapest and Szentendre, Hungary, which stood in for 1950s Paris.

=== Series 2 ===
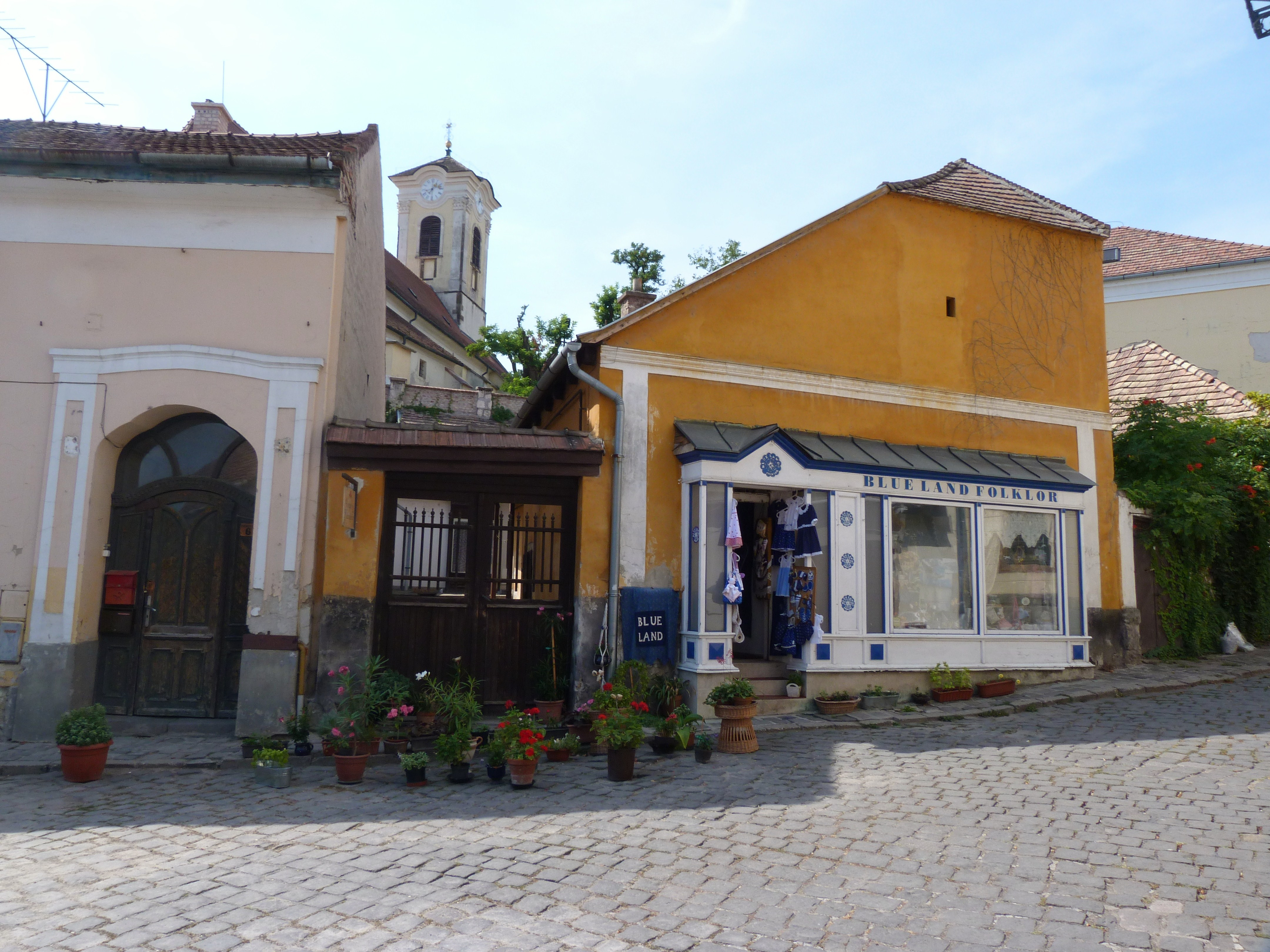
These buildings on Alkotmány Street, Szentendre became the Picratt for Maigret in Montmartre.

Prior to the second episode's airing on 17 June 2016 and after the popularity of the first, ITV commissioned two further episodes, production of which took place between November 2016 and February 2017.

== Episodes ==
=== Series 1 (2016) ===
No. overall	No. in series	Title	Directed by	Written by	Original release date	United Kingdom viewers (millions)
1	1	"Maigret Sets a Trap"	Ashley Pearce	Stewart Harcourt	28 March 2016	7.17
Based on Maigret Sets a Trap. Maigret is under heavy pressure from his superiors and the press because he has failed to catch a serial killer of women with no common feature, except their hair. Maigret sets a trap using undercover police women. The trap yields a clue to a suspect with a wife and mother, both very possessive, just as the decision to replace him as lead investigator brings the pressure to a boiling point.: Katie Lyons as Madame Maguy; David Dawson as Marcel Moncin; Fiona Shaw as Madame Moncin (Marcel's Mother); Rebecca Night as Yvonne Moncin (Marcel's Wife); Rufus Wright as Minister Morel; Eva-Jane Willis as Marthe Jusserand (Policewoman)
2	2	"Maigret's Dead Man"	Jon East	Stewart Harcourt	25 December 2016	5.48
Based on Maigret's Dead Man. One morning an agitated man calls the Police judiciaire asking for Maigret. He claims he's being followed by someone trying to kill him. Before Maigret can get the details he hangs up, calls back again from various cafés until the calls finally stop. That night his body is found, his face badly beaten and has been stabbed to death. Riddled with guilt for not having saved "his" dead man, Maigret is determined to find the murderer.: Ian Puleston-Davies as Inspector Colombani; Ivan Fenyo as Petr; Michael Fitzgerald as Piedboeuf; Peter Schueller as Jean Paul; Anamaria Marinca as Maria; Nathalie Armin as Nina; Philip Starnier as Franz Lehel; John Light as Dacourt

=== Series 2 (2017) ===
No. overall	No. in series	Title	Directed by	Written by	Original release date	United Kingdom viewers (millions)
3	1	"Maigret's Night at the Crossroads"	Sarah Harding	Stewart Harcourt	16 April 2017	5.47
Based on Maigret at the Crossroads. The body of one Jewish jeweller is found in the car of a Danish national who lives with his sister. When the man is taken in for questioning, he denies all knowledge of the murder, but establishing his true identity is problematic. Maigret attends the funeral of an old colleague, and then works with another old colleague on the case.: Ben Caplan as Isaac Goldberg; Wanda Opalinska as Jo Jo; Tom Wlaschiha as Carl Anderson; Mia Jexen as Else Anderson; Stephen Wight as Thierry Bertinet; Kevin McNally as Insp. Grandjean; Paul Chahidi as Michonnet; Chook Sibtain as Oscar
4	2	"Maigret in Montmartre"	Thaddeus O'Sullivan	Guy Andrews	24 December 2017	5.48
Based on Inspector Maigret and the Strangled Stripper. Arlette, an exotic dancer at the "Picratt Club" comes to the police for help, telling Maigret about a "countess" who is in grave danger, but she then flees distrustful and afraid. Soon afterwards she is found murdered; then the countess's body is discovered. Maigret must discover the link between the two women, as he and his men hunt for the killer in Montmartre's streets.: Sebastian de Souza as Philippe; Nicola Sloane as the Countess; Olivia Vinall as Arlette; Lorraine Ashbourne as Rosa Alphonsi; Douglas Hodge as Fred Alphonsi; Simon Gregor as The Grasshopper; Adrian Scarborough as Dr. Bloch; Adrian Rawlins as Oscar
