= Cambridge Shakespeare Festival =

The Cambridge Shakespeare Festival is a festival of the plays of William Shakespeare held annually in Cambridge, England. The festival was founded in 1987 by Artistic Director Dr David Crilly.

The productions are performed in full period costume with live Elizabethan music. The festival attracts upwards of 25,000 visitors for the productions which take place over a period of eight weeks in July and August. Each performance is held outside in the private gardens of colleges of the University of Cambridge, including King's College Gardens, Robinson College Gardens, Girton College Gardens, St John's College Gardens, Trinity College Gardens and Downing College Gardens.

The ethos of the Company is to provide access to all to Shakespeare's work without any prior knowledge of the play or author, and the Artistic Director has made it a Company policy to avoid unnecessary theatrical artifice and special effects. To that end the plays are performed without staging or elaborate lighting and the action takes place in and around the space in which the audience sits. The centrepiece of any production is, therefore, the language - thus returning to Shakespeare's original mode of communication with his audience.

In 2009 The Independent on Sunday listed the Festival fourth in its 'Top 50 UK Arts Festival' and 2015 saw the publication of a book on the history, style and development of the Festival, entitled Shakespeare in Cambridge: a celebration of the Shakespeare Festival, by Andrew Muir.

== Controversies ==
In 2023, an Employment Tribunal found that the festival had been treating actors as volunteers whereas they should be classified as workers. The tribunal found that performers in the festival "endured six-day weeks, extremely long rehearsal and performance days, and were required to leaflet as part of their duties. Many were expected to be off-book from the outset, all without pay". Despite losing this tribunal Dr David Crilly continues to run the festival, with Equity launching a new tribunal in 2025. According to Equity, "At least one college has withdrawn its support for the 2026 Festival with the other colleges watching developments with interest."
