= The Story of Tracy Beaker series 3 =

The Story of Tracy Beaker
- Season 3
- Series Three Title Card
- Starring: Dani Harmer; Lisa Coleman; Montanna Thompson; Nisha Nayar; Clive Rowe; Chelsie Padley; Ciaran Joyce; Ben Hanson; Chloe Hibbert-Waters; James Cartwright; Darragh Mortell; Cara Readle; Jack Edwards; Abby Rakic-Platt; Kristal Lau; Nicola Reynolds; William Tomlin
- No. of episodes: 26

Release
- Original network: CBBC; CBBC HD (repeats)
- Original release: 25 September 2003 – 1 April 2004

Series chronology
- ← Previous; Series 2 Next → Series 4

The third series of the British children's television series The Story of Tracy Beaker began broadcasting on 25 September 2003 on CBBC and ended on 1 April 2004. The series follows the lives of the children living in the fictional children's care home of Stowey House, nicknamed by them "The Dumping Ground". It consists of twenty-six, fifteen-minute episodes. It is the third series in The Story of Tracy Beaker franchise.

== Cast ==
Dani Harmer (Tracy Beaker), Montanna Thompson (Justine Littlewood), Nisha Nayar (Elaine Boyak), Clive Rowe (Duke Ellington), Lisa Coleman (Cam Lawson), Ciaran Joyce, Ben Hanson, Chloe Hibbert-Waters and James Cartwright all returned to their main roles. Stephen Crossley and Caroline Bunce returned to their guest starring role as Justine's father, Steve Littlewood and his wife, Carrie respectively. Adele Azupadi (Rochelle Gadd), Amber Hearst (Alicia Hooper), Ben Batambuze (Luke Youngblood) and Jenny Edwards (Sharlene White) did not return for this series. Padley, who left the main cast last series, made seven guest appearances. Jack Edwards, Kristal Lau, William Tomlin, Darragh Mortell, Abby Rakic-Platt, Nicola Reynolds and Cara Readle all made their debuts as main characters, Marco Maloney, Hayley, Michael Grice, Liam "Crash" Daniels, Jackie Hopper, Shelly Appleton and Layla respectively. Howell Evans began appearing as a guest character and Jackie's grandfather, Jack and Oliver Llewellyn Jenkins appeared as Wilson for two episodes. This was the last series to feature Cartwright, Padley, Tomlin and Hibbert-Waters. Thompson left her main cast role, but made a guest appearance in series four and a main cast return in the final series. Reynolds also left her main cast role, but returned in the final series. Crossley and Bunce left their guest starring roles, but the characters, Steve and Carrie, returned in the final series, played by Morgan Hopkins and Kathryn Dimery.

=== Main ===
- Dani Harmer as Tracy Beaker
- Lisa Coleman as Cam Lawson
- Montanna Thompson as Justine Littlewood
- Nisha Nayar as Elaine Boyak
- Clive Rowe as Duke Ellington
- Ciaran Joyce as Lol Plakova
- Ben Hanson as Bouncer Plakova
- Chloe Hibbert-Waters as Dolly
- James Cartwright as Nathan Jones
- Darragh Mortell as Crash
- Cara Readle as Layla
- Jack Edwards as Marco Maloney
- Abby Rakic-Platt as Jackie Hopper
- Kristal Lau as Hayley
- Nicola Reynolds as Shelley Appelton
- William Tomlin as Michael Grice

=== Guest ===
- Howell Evans as Jack Hopper
- Chelsie Padley as Louise Govern
- Kerry Joy Stewart as Mrs Morris
- David Charles as Mr Bygrave
- Rachel Atkins as Mrs Bygrave
- Vivienne Rowdon as Estate Agent
- Jennifer Robinson as Vicki
- Gareth Piper as James
- Angus Alexander Brown as Philip
- June Campbell as Cathy
- Rebecca Walker as Sophie
- Lynn Hunter as Maureen
- Mark Flanagan as Dave
- Jude Mitson as Zara
- Oliver Llewellyn Jenkins as Wilson
- Richard Pask as Adam
- Paul Mohan as Logan
- Sophie Sherrington as Kelly
- Krupa Patel as Sufia
- Caroline Bunce as Carrie
- Dan Winter as Charlie Kean
- Ryan Nelson as Jake
- Matt Zarb as Tom
- Morgan Hopkins as Ron
- Sara McGaughey as Gwen
- Gareth Wyn Griffiths as Dave
- Debra Glazer as Jemima
- Stephen Crossley as Steve Littlewood
- Dafydd Wyn-Roberts as Steward

== Episodes ==
No. in series	Title	Directed by	Written by	Original release date	Prod. code
1	"Leavin' on a Jet Plane"	Delyth Thomas	Mary Morris	25 September 2003	3.1
Tracy speaks to Ben, who is now at boarding school, on the phone about how she is practically in charge since Jenny left. When Elaine arrives, she becomes stressed when the young people are not ready for the arrival of the new head care worker. Shelley arrives early, stops the chaos and tells everyone to clean up. The young people eavesdrop when Tracy is allowed to remain in a staff meeting, but Tracy is angry and upset when Shelley believes Tracy should be moved to another care home due to the concern that she is too settled at The Dumping Ground. When Tracy goes to live with Cam, she is upset that Cam is going to New York on a writing course. The young people and staff decide to pack their bags and sit outside in protest of Shelley's decision over Tracy. Cam returns to The Dumping Ground and confronts Shelley about Tracy. Cam joins in the protest, risking her missing her flight and Shelley changes her mind on making Tracy leave. First Appearances: Darragh Mortell as Crash, Cara Readle as Layla, Jack Edwards as Marco Maloney, Nicola Reynolds as Shelley Appleton, Kristal Lau as Hayley and William Tomlin as Michael Grice
2	"Supernatural Shelley"	Delyth Thomas	Laura Summers	2 October 2003	3.2
The young people and staff complain about the way Shelley does stuff compared to Jenny and Shelley forbids Tracy from allowing to get her nose and ears pierced. Shelley tells the young people that she wants to make changes, allowing the young people to give her ideas. After Tracy yells that she wants Justine moved to another care home and no care workers telling her what to do, Elaine offers help, but Shelley has her moving pot plants. Shelley confiscates Nathan's new packet of hair dye and she tells Lol and Bouncer that she is getting Crash and Michael to share a room so they can have their own room. Justine dares Tracy to dye her hair, but it turns out green and she fights with Justine when she makes a nasty comment saying that she looks ugly. The young people start a food fight and everyone tells Shelley what they want, so she allows Crash to have his room back, warns Michael about his behaviour, reassures Justine about yogurt coming off her new top, lets Bouncer and Lol share again and puts Hayley's picture in her office. When Dolly says she has lost her blanket, Shelley looks through the rubbish for the blanket, which Tracy found. Tracy decides not to have her ears pierced when Shelley offers, saying that Cam once had her earlobe infected when she had her ear pierced.
3	"Jackie"	Delyth Thomas	Gary Parker	9 October 2003	3.3
Jackie arrives at The Dumping Ground and runs away immediately, but when she is brought in, Elaine asks Tracy to make sure Jackie does not leave in exchange for a giant chocolate bar. Jackie is introduced to the young people, adamant she is not going to be fostered and she fights with Michael when he takes her tin to look in. Jackie runs off again during Nathan's tour and at dinner, Crash almost loses his temper when Michael provokes him and Jackie berates the young people. During the night, Jackie prepares to run off, but is caught by Shelley and agrees not to run away, but when she distracts Shelley, she leaves. Jackie is brought back again and Tracy decides to help, letting Jackie organise a sports day for them, but Jackie runs off under the pretence of a cross country and Tracy finds her. Jackie confides in Tracy about her granddad, who is in a home, and shows her the medal in the tin and Tracy suggests she stays for a while. Tracy, Crash and Jackie are amused when Michael opens the tin, which is filled with worms. First Appearance: Abby Rakic-Platt as Jackie Hopper
4	"Free Louise"	Delyth Thomas	Laura Summers	16 October 2003	3.4
Tracy argues with Elaine about meeting foster parents she picked, so Elaine decides to let Tracy pick who she wants to meet. Louise arrives at The Dumping Ground to see everyone, but her foster mum advises her not to show off and she tells Justine she cannot stay long due to going to the park with her family. Louise tells everyone that he foster parents do not have much time for her due to their other children, claiming they do not let her use the phone and are horrible. The young people order that Elaine and Shelley help Louise, but when they think Tracy is using her own views on fostering about Louise, Tracy decides she does not want to meet foster parents and the young people decide to help Louise. The young people, apart from Michael, go on hunger strike for Louise, but they give in when Duke makes pizza and cake and Justine finally gives in when she asks Duke for them to go to the park. At the park, she and Tracy hire a bike and Elaine and Duke cycle after them. Tracy and Justine find Louise, who admits the Morris family is not horrible and she apologises. Louise helps Tracy along with Justine and Jackie to pick foster parents.
5	"The Bygraves"	Delyth Thomas	Gary Parker	23 October 2003	3.5
Tired of Michael bullying the little ones, snitching on the older ones and constantly sucking up to the staff, Tracy realises that she and Justine could get rid of him for good if they could find someone to foster him. When she stumbles across The Bygraves (ironically funeral directors), she reckons they might just be desperate enough to even consider Michael. Meanwhile, Crash takes Jackie to the care home where her Grandpa is now living.
6	"Down with School"	Delyth Thomas	Laura Summers	30 October 2003	3.6
Shelley tells Jackie that Nathan will be supervising her with her homeschooling and Tracy wishes she did not have to go to school. Layla is upset she has to miss her school play rehearsal for physiotherapy and Michael fools Nathan into believing he has hurt his leg, allowing him to stay off school and Tracy and Crash declare that they are not going to school. Nathan decides to tutor Tracy, Crash and Jackie when they play on video games, but when he attempts to teach Maths with food, they start a food fight and when Elaine arrives, she takes on the tutoring. Michael annoys Layla when he takes her costume wings and script and Elaine believes Michael did not take them. At lunch, Tracy and Crash tell Jackie she should go back to school and after trashing his room trying to find her costume wings and script, Layla chases after Michael to get him back. When Elaine and Nathan confront him over his supposed injury, Layla backs Michael up and Jackie decides she wants to go back to school.
7	"Crashed and Thrashed"	Delyth Thomas	Mary Morris	6 November 2003	3.7
Crash and Tracy are both in lousy moods and fall out at breakfast. When Cam sends Tracy an 'I love NY' T-shirt in the post, Tracy can't resist boasting about her exciting new present to Crash. Then, when Nathan accidentally ruins the T-shirt, both Tracy and Crash's tempers reach frightening levels, leaving Nathan certain that he must take action against Crash's temper.
8	"No-one Quite Like Grandpa"	Delyth Thomas	Othniel Smith	13 November 2003	3.8
Jackie decides that it's finally time to rescue Grandpa, and enlists Tracy's help. The girls sneak out of the DG, and successfully get Grandpa back to his old house. Finding his Alzheimer's is really bad Tracy has to make a tough decision. Meanwhile, Michael falls in love with Louise, giving the other kids a chance to get revenge on him for countless snitching and bullying. Note: Guest appearance of Louise Govern.
9	"Down to Earth"	Joss Agnew	Dan Anthony	20 November 2003	3.9
The young people spend their time at breakfast answering questions from a radio station for a competition with boxes of Breckles. Bouncer accidentally gives away an answer to a question that Lol got from Elaine and when the young people rush to the payphone when they acquire the answers, Tracy uses the office phone and she answers all the questions right, winning tickets to the rock and pop awards. Tracy suffers stomachache when she decides whom to take and when Shelley reprimands Tracy for what she did, she tells her that she can go, but a draw will be organised to decide who goes with her and Elaine will accompany them. Tracy is disappointed that Michael and Dolly win the draw and prior to leaving for the awards, Tracy suffers further stomachache and collapses. Tracy wakes up the following morning in hospital, where Shelley tells her she had her appendix taken out and Tracy is unhappy that Elaine, Michael and Dolly went to the awards, along with Layla. Crash and Jackie also visit and Tracy is delighted when Cam returns from New York.
10	"Nothing Happens Here"	Joss Agnew	Mary Morris	27 November 2003	3.10
Michael's big brother, James, arrives at the DG on the run from his care home, and he is discovered by Tracy and Jackie. But his brother's arrival brings out a new, sensitive side that no-one at the DG was prepared for. But will Tracy help him keep his brother a secret from the staff? Meanwhile, Cam announces she is writing a book based on the Dumping Ground, and everyone starts gathering stories for her. But she becomes increasingly exasperated by everyone's eager offers for help. Note: Guest Appearance of Louise Govern.
11	"The Beaker Club"	Joss Agnew	Simon Nicholson	4 December 2003	3.11
Dolly, Marco and Hayley form "The Beaker Club", pulling pranks on the staff and acting just like Tracy. But when the club dedicated to her nearly costs Dolly her ideal foster family, Tracy tries to put everything right again. Note: Final appearance of Dolly.
12	"Power Cut"	Joss Agnew	Abigail Abben Mensah	11 December 2003	3.12
The DG residents are thrown into chaos when there's a sudden power cut. Tracy and the others aren't impressed at the prospect of an evening with no TV, music, computers or cooking, so Tracy decides to entertain everyone by telling ghost stories. Note: Guest appearance of Louise Govern.
13	"Just Desserts"	Joss Agnew	Othniel Smith	18 December 2003	3.13
Aspiring chef Bouncer takes a small step towards achieving his ambition: by getting a Saturday job in a bakery. Lol can't help feeling at a bit of a loss without his brother around. Tracy is also feeling sidelined when she discovers that Cam's got herself a snooty literary agent, Zara, so Tracy and Lol take a trip to Bouncer's bakery and clash with his boss, who really dislikes them. Meanwhile Marco drives Crash, Jackie and Layla mad with his imaginary friend.
14	"Mind Your Own Business"	Joss Agnew	Holly Lyons	8 January 2004	3.14
It's a busy day at the DG, as Elaine finds herself running the house single-handed. But Michael and Crash come to blows when she announces that a new kid Wilson is arriving, and one of them will have to share with him, so Bouncer starts a championship to see who will be sharing with Wilson. Tracy reckons it's about time Louise got her own back on her prankster boyfriend, Adam. All goes to plan until Tracy realises that she's got the wrong guy -Wilson, and with Elaine keeping a close eye on her, the house's biggest troublemaker, will Wilson cover for her? Note: Guest appearance of Louise Govern.
15	"I Am Not In Love"	Joss Agnew	Holly Lyons	15 January 2004	3.15
Tracy develops a crush on Wilson, but is loath to admit it. however, it becomes clear to the whole DG when she accepts an invitation to visit Wilson's mother with him in hospital, and whilst out with Cam, she cannot stop talking about him. Is Tracy in love? Meanwhile, Duke gets a new phone, and Lol and Crash plot to cause mischief by sending Duke romantics texts from Shelley's phone, leaving Duke convinced Shelley is in love with him. Tracy then kisses Wilson and doesn't notice that Justine is watching. Note: Guest appearance of Wilson (Oliver Llewellyn Jenkins).
16	"Time Capsule"	Joss Agnew	Marvin Close	22 January 2004	3.16
Justine winds Tracy up after witnessing her kissing Wilson and Shelley breaks the news to Tracy that Wilson left in the night. Duke gets the young people to do some digging in the garden and Tracy cringes when Shelley attempts to talk to her about relationships. Michael digs up a box and runs off when everyone insists he shares what is inside. The young people open the box, which is a time capsule and contains clothing and photos, so Duke suggests they do one themselves. Shelley allows Justine and Jackie to make a film instead of Lol and Tracy refuses to join in. Michael takes some smelly cheese from Duke and over lunch, the young people row after disagreements over the time capsule, so Tracy takes charge and assigns everyone tasks. Tracy cheers Hayley up by looking for a photo of her mum and Michael plants the smelly cheese in the time capsule. When the young people are about to bury the capsule, Michael takes out the cheese and Tracy gets Wilson's phone number. Note: In Tracy Beaker Returns, the capsule is found, even though it takes place in a different house, and at some point during Tracy's life, she made clues to the time capsule.
17	"Football Trial"	Joss Agnew	Andy Walker	29 January 2004	3.17
Lol is fast turning into the next David Beckham, and Tracy is quick to notice. Before Lol knows it, Tracy is acting as his manager, and has snuck him into a professional football ground demanding that the manager give him a trial. Meanwhile, Elaine begins Sports Day at the DG, with Jackie and Bouncer as team captains after Shelley fakes an injury to get out of the event.
18	"We Are Family"	Joss Agnew	Tracy Brabin	5 February 2004	3.18
Tracy and Lol turn detective to try to get to the bottom of Bouncer's strange behaviour. Marco is also on a mission; to find out where babies come from. Note: Montana Thompson as Justine Littlewood is absent for this episode.
19	"Be Prepared"	Laurence Wilson	Laura Summers	12 February 2004	3.19
Layla is determined to get enough cub scout badges to secure a place on the camping trip, and Tracy and Jackie are put in charge of supervising her, but quickly fall out when Tracy suggests that it's time for some Beaker-style assistance. Refusing to cheat, Jackie and Layla struggle on without Tracy, and Michael also plots to ruin her work. Note: Montana Thompson as Justine Littlewood is absent for this episode.
20	"Sufia the Silent"	Laurence Wilson	Ariane Sherine	19 February 2004	3.20
Tracy's nose is put out of joint when she's forced to share her room with new arrival Sufia, who doesn't speak English. However, when Sufia finds herself on the receiving end of Michael's bullying, Tracy is forced to step in and come to her defence. Meanwhile, Bouncer, Lol and Jackie get carried away with a game of football, and end up breaking a picture in the lounge, which results in an art competition at the DG. When they three are forced to pay for it, they attempt to scam Nathan with a game of cards Note: Montana Thompson as Justine Littlewood is absent in this episode, although Tracy mentions her.
21	"Babies Suck!"	Laurence Wilson	Mary Morris	26 February 2004	3.21
Justine is desperate for her Dad and Carrie to ask her home with them for good. However, when they cancel taking her out for the day, Justine begins to doubt that it'll ever happen. Justine fears the worst when she hears that Carrie is on her way round to speak to her. When Carrie arrives and announces that she's pregnant, Justine is certain that her dream will never come true.
22	"Exploited"	Laurence Wilson	Marvin Close	4 March 2004	3.22
Everyone is in high spirits when the TV company arrive at the DG, for the launch of Cam's book 'The Dumping Ground Kids'. Tracy tries to steal the limelight at every opportunity – convinced that she's the inspiration for the star of the book 'Trudy' – a tough no-nonsense kid who is queen of the scammers. But Tracy's in for a nasty surprise, when she finally reads the last chapter. Meanwhile, Justine glamorizes herself for the TV, and Bouncer and Jackie get revenge on an arrogant TV producer who refuses Jackie a photo.
23	"Be Quiet"	Laurence Wilson	Dan Anthony	11 March 2004	3.23
Tracy goes through the motions with three sets of hopeless potential foster parents on a trip to the science museum, until she befriends Jake and Tom, a father and son. Meanwhile, Hayley is tired of being called quiet and plots to show everyone how loud and destructive she can be. Note: First appearance of Jake (Ryan Nelson) & Tom (Matt Zarb)
24	"Dad Trouble"	Laurence Wilson	Gary Parker	18 March 2004	3.24
Tracy is determined to win Jake and Tom over. She realises that if she's going to impress them, then she needs to brush up on her skills at being around little brothers and dads. Meanwhile, Justine is tired of everyone talking about Steve and Carrie's baby, and tries to train to be a good big sister. Note: Guest Appearance of Louise Govern (Chelsie Padley), Jake (Ryan Nelson) & Tom (Matt Zarb)
25	"The Big Race"	Laurence Wilson	Gary Parker	25 March 2004	3.25
Jackie is caught off guard when she gets a letter from her Grandpa telling her that they're both entered in a charity race tomorrow. Tracy gets busy signing up sponsors, whilst Crash helps Jackie to train for the big day. Meanwhile, Cam comes round to see Tracy in a desperate attempt to make amends. But Tracy is sticking to her guns and Cam finds herself out in the cold.
26	"Good as Gold"	Laurence Wilson	Mary Morris	1 April 2004	3.26
There's a BBQ party to celebrate Justine leaving. Jackie goes to collect Grandpa to join the party, and is devastated to discover that he is in a wheelchair. Marco dresses up as a magician for the party but can't seem to do anything magic, until he pinches Duke's flip-flops while he is asleep and sends them up high into the sky tied to helium balloons! Jackie is determined that her Grandpa will still be the fastest Grandpa in the land and soon gets him wheeling at top speed. As Justine heads off to begin her new life, Tracy has to face the fact that she's the last kid from the old Dumping Ground gang to be left behind. Note: Final appearance of Michael Grice (William Tomlin), Louise Govern (Chelsie Padley), Nathan Jones (James Cartwright), Jake (Ryan Nelson) & Tom (Matt Zarb)

== Production ==
Cas Lester left the production team after the previous series and was replaced by the former producer, Jane Dauncey. Dauncey was then replaced by Mia Jupp. Filming took place after series two had aired, in 2003. The series 2 directors, Delyth Thomas and Joss Agnew, returned, but were joined by Laurence Wilson. Thomas directed eight episodes, Agnew directed ten episodes and Wilson directed seven episodes. Mary Morris is head writer of this series. Ian Carrey, Rob Gittins, Lucy Flannery and writing duo, Sam Bain & Jesse Armstrong did not return to write any episodes of series 3. They were replaced by Dan Anthony, Simon Nicholson, Holly Lyons, Marvin Close and Ariane Sherine. Returning from writing episodes of series 1 and series 2 are Morris, Laura Summers, Othniel Smith and Andy Walker while returning from writing episodes of only series 2 are Gary Parker, Abigal Abben-Mensah and Tracy Brabin. Morris wrote five episodes; Summers and Parker wrote four episodes each; Smith, Anthony, Lyons and Close wrote two episodes each; and Nicholson, Mensah, Walker, Brabin and Sherine wrote one episode each.

===== Set Changes =====
In regards to the Stowey House set location in Llanishen the dining room has been moved from the front of the house with a window facing the drive to the room behind it with french doors leading out to the garden switching places with the main office. The living room has been re painted turquoise, the office (old dining room) purple and dining room yellow (old office). Crash has moved into Justine's old bedroom, Justine into Adele's old room, Michael in Louise's old room, Layla in Dolly's old room and Jackie in Amber's old room. The bathroom has been repainted yellow with polka dots and several upstairs landings have been painted opal green as opposed to the previous orange.

== Awards and nominations ==
Ceremony	Award	Nominee	Result
2004 Children's BAFTA Awards	Children's Writer – Adapted In	Mary Morris	Nominated

== Ratings ==
Episode no.	Total viewers	CBBC weekly ranking
1	519,000	1
2	716,000	1
3	422,000	1
4	513,000	1
5	689,000	1
6	389,000	1
7	458,000	1
8	684,000	1
9	409,000	1
10	399,000	1
11	528,000	1
12	590,000	1
13	326,000	1
14	318,000	3
15	245,000	10
16	108,000	—N/a
17	745,000	1
18	862,000	1
19	996,000	1
20	914,000	1
21	285,000	4
22	171,000	—N/a
23	011,000	—N/a
24	285,000	—N/a
25	305,000	8
26	491,000	2
