= List of The Story of Tracy Beaker characters =

This is a list of characters that were introduced in CBBC's The Story of Tracy Beaker. The series is based on the book of the same name by Jacqueline Wilson. It ran on for five series from 2002 to 2005. The series was followed by Tracy Beaker Returns that ran for three series from 2010 to 2012 and then The Dumping Ground that has aired since 2013. Connor Byrne has played the role of Mike Milligan for all three programmes although he left at the end of The Dumping Ground's seventh series. Dani Harmer, Lisa Coleman and Montanna Thompson reprised their roles as Tracy Beaker, Cam Lawson and Justine Littlewood for Tracy Beaker Returns, and again in My Mum Tracy Beaker.

== Main characters ==
=== Mike Milligan ===
Mike Milligan
- Tracy Beaker series character
- Portrayed by: Connor Byrne
- Duration: 2002, 2005, 2010–2019, 2023
- First appearance: "Tracy Returns to the Dumping Ground"; 8 January 2002
- Last appearance: "Trial of Tracy Beaker"; 31 March 2023
- Created by: Jacqueline Wilson
- Introduced by: Cas Lester (2002); Josephine Ward (2004, 2005, 2010) Emma Reeves (2023)
In-universe information
- Other names: Conchobhar
- Occupation: Care worker; House chef; Head care worker
- Mother: Sheila
- Brothers: Peadar
- Wife: Fiona Johnson
- Uncles: Declan
- Nephews: Edwin
- First cousins: Brian

Michael Kevin Lucius "Mike" Milligan MBE, made his first appearance on 8 January 2002 in series 1 of The Story of Tracy Beaker during the episode "Tracy Returns to The Dumping Ground" and departed in "The End!" but he returned in series 5 during the episode "Caring and Sharing" as a temporary care worker. He became head care worker in "Operation Careworker". Mike appeared in all 3 series of Tracy Beaker Returns and the first 7 series of The Dumping Ground. Mike is the longest-serving character in the Tracy Beaker franchise, being in the very first episode back in 2002, leaving in Series 7, Episode 24 in 2019.

Mike is tall and slim, with grey hair and blue eyes. He is portrayed as a lovable, kind but firm guardian to the children in his care, able to deliver anger and humour to the children in equal doses. He has shared many emotional moments with the children. He is seen as a father figure to many of them, in particular to Tracy, Justine, Peter, Carmen, Tee, Gus, and Harry, something they have mentioned.

Mike makes his first appearance in the first episode of The Story of Tracy Beaker; he is a care worker at Stowey House, and has been for some time – he is already on good terms with Tracy Beaker (Dani Harmer), thinking she's a 'good kid on the whole'. He leaves at the end of series 1 after an emergency call in another care home. Mike returns in series 5 as Elm Tree House's new chef. When head care worker, Shelley Appelton (Nicola Reynolds), decides to leave Elm Tree House she holds interviews for possible head care workers, who none of the young people like, so they beg Mike to take up the role, which he does.

The character of Mike returns in Tracy Beaker Returns, appearing in every episode of the show; it is implied that he never left Elm Tree House and continued to act as head care worker. Mike is first seen with Gina Conway (Kay Purcell) when he is saying that they need more staff. He is then seen collecting Liam O'Donovan (Richard Wisker) from the local police station and met up with Tracy (Dani Harmer) after she is arrested for fraud. Mike offers her a job at the Dumping Ground because it is short-staffed, with only himself and Gina working there. As a result of this, Tracy and Mike get to know each other again and become closer. In the third series of the show, Mike is offered an MBE and accepts it, and later in the series, he only just survives when a roof falls on him. Mike continues to appear as Head Care Worker throughout "The Dumping Ground"; in the first episode he leaves to go on holiday, only for chaos to occur at Elm Tree House until he returns at the end of the second episode, although he knows nothing about it as Gina worries he may not take another holiday again. In the eighth episode of the fourth series Carmen Howle (Amy-Leigh Hickman) reports Mike to the police, as Mike's car has been broken into, with Carmen file inside the car, and it had been stolen. However, it is revealed that Ryan Reeves (Lewis Hamilton) took the file as revenge for Mike telling the kids about his history, though he was only protecting Ryan. Mike forgives Ryan and agrees not to tell everyone. They end their feud. He later marries Fiona whom he dated 30 years ago in Series 6 Episode 24.

In the Series 7 episode, "Reunion", it is revealed that he has a twin brother named Peadar, who both grew up in a bad care home. He returns to Ireland, where he was born. He meets his mother, Sheila, and patches up his strained relationship with his brother. In the finale, he decides to leave Ashdene Ridge to return to Ireland, to be with his family. This retcons the backstory of Mike, whose character had originally revealed contradictory elements of his history in Series 5 of The Story of Tracy Beaker. Formally, Mike had suggested that his father had walked out on his mother during his teens, and indicates to Jackie that he does not understand the perspective of living as a child in care. Mike does reveal the existence of his brother during this series, however, while not specifically indicating that this brother is an identical twin.

=== Cam Lawson ===
Cam Lawson
- Tracy Beaker series character
- Portrayed by: Lisa Coleman
- Duration: 2002–2005, 2010–2012, 2021–2023
- First appearance: "Cam's First Visit"; 17 January 2002
- Last appearance: "Trial of Tracy Beaker"; 31 March 2023
- Introduced by: Cas Lester (2002); Josephine Ward (2010); Emma Reeves (2021)
In-universe information
- Occupation: Author
- Mother: Penelope Lawson
- Husband: Gary (Divorced)
- Wife: Mary Oliver
- Adoptive daughters: Tracy Beaker; Lily Kettle (foster)

Camilla "Cam" Lawson is a struggling turned successful author, and Tracy's eventual adoptive mother.

Cam makes her début appearance when she visits Stowey House in series 1. Also an aspiring author, Tracy tries to get her attention by unsuccessfully using Adele's makeup. When Cam reads her stories, she is impressed and makes a number of return visits. Having formed a bond with Cam, Tracy asked her to use her investigative skills to find her birth mother. Cam initially agrees. However, she abandons her mission having learned from Jenny that her mother has deliberately severed ties with her daughter. Initially upset with Cam, Tracy forgives her. Having been asked by Tracy on numerous occasions to be her foster mother, Cam eventually agrees at the end of series 1.

Unfortunately, the foster placement is short lived when Tracy accidentally sets fire to Cam's kitchen (series 2). With the damages being so severe that Cam can no longer look after her properly, Tracy returns to the Dumping Ground. Whilst Tracy initially blocks Cam from her life they eventually make up and rekindle their relationship as friends. Whilst they see each other regularly, Cam is hesitant to foster her again. When she learns that Tracy is being fostered by Ben's aunt and uncle, she is deeply upset. However, Tracy eventually decides not to be fostered and remains at the Dumping Ground.

In the third season, Cam leaves for New York for a writing course, but returns after she hears that Tracy is hospitalised for appendicitis. Cam writes a novel about a girl in care whose character is based upon Tracy. Cam falls out with Tracy again after the latter reads the ending and discovers that her inspiring character does not get fostered. They eventually reconcile.

In 'The Movie of Me' (between series 3 and 4), Cam decides to foster Tracy again. However, Tracy's birth mother turns up and initially seems willing to take Tracy back into her care. Tracy goes to find her mum after she leaves, having fallen out with care workers. Cam is distraught and as soon as she finds out where she is, she pursues her with Justine in tow. When they find her, Cam realises that Tracy's mum does not care for her and eventually fosters Tracy.

In series 4, Cam and Tracy are happily living together again. Tracy often returns to the Dumping Ground to visit her friends.

In series 5, Cam and Tracy are on holiday in Egypt, where Cam develops a relationship with Gary. When they return to England, Tracy angrily returns to the Dumping Ground when Gary moves in. Having shunned Cam once again, they reconcile in and Tracy starts to bond with Gary. This is short lived as Cam reveals that she and Gary are getting married. On the day of their wedding, Tracy, having eventually been convinced that Cam and Gary will not neglect her as a married couple, turns up at the wedding to hear them say "I do". Afterwards, Cam and Gary tell Tracy that they are adopting her, before they leave on their honeymoon.

Sometime between the end of the original series and the start of Tracy Beaker Returns, Cam and Gary divorce under unknown circumstances.

At the beginning of the first series ('Tracy Beaker Returns'), Tracy uses Cam's credit card to publish her autobiography, and is arrested. However, Cam agrees that she will drop the charges on the condition that Tracy pays her back. To earn money, Tracy finds employment as a trainee care worker at the Dumping Ground. In her first week, Tracy discovers that Cam and Mike had kept a letter from her birth mother a secret for years. At this point, there is a continuity error when Tracy exclaims that she has "never seen" her birth mother, in contradiction to flashbacks in series 1 of the original series, and the feature-length movie.

Tracy and Cam fall out, but as usual, they reconcile. In the series 1 finale, when Tracy announces that she has been offered a job in London and will be leaving, Mike asks Cam to foster another child. Cam disagrees, but Johnny overhears a later phone call saying that there is no point fostering again if Tracy is not going to move out, prompting him to decide to be interviewed by Tracy in another scheme to get himself and Tee fostered. When Cam learns of this, she goes to the Dumping Ground to see Johnny and Tee to tell them that it is not definitive that she will foster again.

In the second season, Cam fosters Lily Kettle after she falls off the roof of the Dumping Ground during a protest. In the final episode, Cam travels to New York. Whilst she was initially supposed to go for a few weeks, she announces that she has been given an opportunity to stay for six months, and that she has accepted it.

In the third season, Cam is still in New York and communicates with Tracy via the internet, eventually returning to England.

Cam is also seen in 'The Tracy Beaker Survival Files' where she is interviewed by Tracy.

In My Mum Tracy Beaker, it is revealed that she is a lesbian, as she meets and ends up marrying Mary Oliver, Jess' teacher.

Cam makes guest appearances throughout "The Beaker Girls"

=== Elaine Boyak ===
Elaine Boyak
- The Story of Tracy Beaker character
- Portrayed by: Nisha Nayar
- Duration: 2002–2005, 2021, 2023
- First appearance: "Dares"; 8 January 2002
- Last appearance: Telling Stories; 3 March 2023
- Introduced by: Cas Lester 2002; Emma Reeves (2021, 2023)
In-universe information
- Occupation: Social worker

Elaine Boyak (known as Elaine the Pain), portrayed by Nisha Nayar, made her first appearance on 8 January 2002 in series 1 during the episode "Dares". Her last appearance was during the episode "The Wedding" in series 5. It is unknown what happened to Elaine, and she hasn't been mentioned since. Elaine wasn't everyone's favourite person, as she was nicknamed "Elaine the Pain". In 2021, she featured in the music video of the remix of "Someday" by Keisha White alongside Chelsie Padley who portrayed Louise Govern. In 2023 she made a guest appearance in the Beaker Girls.

=== Duke Ellington ===
Duke Ellington
- The Story of Tracy Beaker character
- Portrayed by: Clive Rowe
- Duration: 2002–2005
- First appearance: "Tracy Returns to the Dumping Ground"; 8 January 2002
- Last appearance: "We're Off the Map Now"; 5 April 2005
- Introduced by: Cas Lester
In-universe information
- Occupation: Chef; Gardener; Care worker

Norman 'Duke’ Ellington, portrayed by Clive Rowe, is a care-worker and also The Dumping Ground's chef and gardener. He is nicknamed after the jazz musician with whom he shares a surname.

He first appeared in the first episode of series 1 and departed in the final episode of series 4, when he went to visit family in the Caribbean. After this episode, most of the kids started to think he wasn't coming back, which ended up being true.

Like many of the staff, he maintains a disliking aura toward Elaine the Pain, having once locked her in the pantry to hide her from an inspector.

=== Jenny Edwards ===
Jenny Edwards
- The Story of Tracy Beaker character
- Portrayed by: Sharlene Whyte
- Duration: 2002–2003
- First appearance: "Tracy Returns to the Dumping Ground"; 8 January 2002
- Last appearance: "Home and Hosed"; 3 April 2003
- Introduced by: Cas Lester
In-universe information
- Occupation: Head care worker Fashion designer

Jenny Ruth Edwards, portrayed by Sharlene Whyte, is the Dumping Ground's head care-worker from series 1 to 2. She is strict, but cares for the young people a lot and secretly despises social worker Elaine "The Pain" Boyak. Jenny leaves at the end of the second series, for a new job. She makes a couple of cameo appearances in later series as a cartoon character. Jenny was last mentioned in Tracy Beaker Returns. She was replaced by Shelley Appleton in Series 3.

=== Justine Littlewood ===
Justine Littlewood
- Tracy Beaker series character
- Portrayed by: Montanna Thompson
- Duration: 2002–2004, 2005, 2012, 2021–2023, 2025
- First appearance: "Tracy Returns to the Dumping Ground"; 8 January 2002
- Last appearance: The Dumping Ground: Series 13
- Introduced by: Cas Lester (2002); Jane Dauncey (2005); Josephine Ward (2005, 2012); Emma Reeves (2021)
In-universe information
- Occupation: Student; Estate agent
- Father: Steve Littlewood
- Stepmother: Carrie
- Half-brothers: Billy
- Sons: Steve Godfrey Littlewood
- First cousins: John

Justine Littlewood portrayed by Montanna Thompson, was the rival of Tracy Beaker. She was put into care after her father, Steve Littlewood, couldn't cope after the death of her mother. He visited her occasionally.

The Story of Tracy Beaker Series 1 (2002) - At Stowey House, she occupied Tracy Beaker's old room, this is until Tracy returns, causing an argument between the pair and starting Tracy and Justine's iconic rivalry.

Tracy Beaker Returns Series 3 (2012) - Justine returned in the third series of Tracy Beaker Returns for one episode, where she arrives and asks Mike to give her away at her wedding after her father didn't approve of her fiancé, Charlie. Carmen Howle took a liking to Justine (and Charlie) and thought they'd be the perfect foster parents for her. Mike invites Justine and Charlie round for lunch, or as the kids called it an Engagement Party (much to Tracy's disgust). At lunch Justine continues to talk about herself making Tracy feel jealous, but Justine crosses the line after she tells everyone that when Tracy was a kid, she used to lie a lot about her mum being a big Hollywood star. And that she'd join her in Hollywood to be a star too. Justine then added that she almost believed her, seemingly trying to make out she wasn't being mean but it was obvious to Tracy that she was. During lunch Justine's fiancé Charlie gets a phone call, Rick Barber (who was already suspicious of Charlie) sneaks out the dining room to listen in on Charlie, and it sounds dodgy. Especially when Charlie comes back into the dining room saying his mum has had a fall, which didn't sound like what Rick overheard. Rick then follows Charlie out telling him he knows what he's doing as his parents were con artists too. Charlie threatens Rick and bribes him not to tell Justine by giving him a new laptop. After lunch Justine takes Gina Conway, Carmen, Lily Kettle, Tee Taylor and Sapphire Fox shopping, they come back with loads of clothes and jewellery from Justine and while they were out, Justine told the girls about the time when Tracy dared her to steal Jenny Edwards' clothes while she was in the shower (which later the girls decide to steal Tracy's clothes while she's in the shower, thinking she'd find it funny, which she didn't find amusing in the slightest). Later in the dining room Justine is discussing her wedding day plans to Carmen, showing her pictures of the venue and her wedding dress, and even invites Carmen along to the wedding. Carmen then asks Justine about fostering which freaks Justine out a little but says she'll think about it and talk to Charlie after Carmen said it worked for Cam and Tracy. Tracy overhears this and grows a little jealous but also thinks Justine is just saying she'll foster Carmen to get one over on Tracy. Justine then says that Tracy hasn't changed and that she still thinks the whole world revolves around Tracy Beaker and then starts mocking her book she wrote, which starts a classic Beaker and Littlewood Brawl. Carmen stops them and shouts at Tracy and saying how much she believes that Justine and Charlie are going to foster her. Rick then walks in a decides to tell the truth about Charlie. Rick tells Justine that Charlie is a con man and has loads of other girls on the go and twists things and lies to scam all these girls for their money, Justine refuses to believe her husband to be could be this evil, but agrees to team up with Tracy to find out the truth. So Justine, Tracy, Rick and Cam to team up to set a trap to catch Charlie out. After Charlie is caught out by Justine, with the help of Rick, Cam and Tracy, Justine ends it with Charlie and goes up to make up with her dad. Justine later goes back to the Dumping Ground to tell Mike and Gina what happened and what Charlie was up to, and that she found out Charlie's mum was in on the whole scam as well. Justine then goes to speak to Carmen to apologise that she won't be able to foster Carmen anymore after what's happened. Carmen calmly accepts the decision and reminds Justine what Tracy always tells them, that Dumping Ground Kids can cope with anything. Justine then tells Carmen to never to tell anyone she said that "Tracy Beaker's right". Before Justine leaves, her and Tracy have a heart to heart and reminisce their times in the DG. Tracy then goes on to say that she is a complete failure compared to Justine, but Justine says she doesn't think Tracy is a failure because her job just makes good money, while Tracy's job changes lives, then tells Tracy she's doing OK.

My Mum Tracy Beaker (2021) Justine emerges again as Tracy's arch nemeses. At first, the two are getting along well and reminiscing over past characters in the franchise. Justine takes a liking to Sean Godfrey, Tracy's fiance, and begins an affair with him. It ultimately leads to the break-off of the wedding and Tracy's depressed state in the series/movie. Justine is present in the last episode, popping up at Tracy's workplace for an unknown reason. A fight occurs and scares off Justine, who seems heartbroken and lonely.

The Beaker Girls (2021)

Justine appears in the second installment, The Beaker Girls, for two episodes in which she tells Tracy to leave Sean Godfrey alone as she believes they are back together. This leads to an argument between Sean and Justine, revealing that they continued seeing each other but had a toxic on-and-off relationship.

Tracy took her into the Dumping Ground Shop and tried to calm her down, but Justine clearly had something on her mind. She revealed that her father, Steve Littlewood, had been diagnosed with dementia, and she had been visiting him at a care home. Throughout the episode, Justine tries to inform Sean and Tracy about something else important but is interrupted every time. Finally, when she attempted for the second time, Sean entered the building, and it caused her to hesitate and not reveal her secret. She then leaves abruptly.

In Episode 5, Justine appears again after a few months and announces the death of her father due to dementia. It is also disclosed from her appearance that she was pregnant along and in her last trimester. Justine is disturbed by Sean's surprise presence, concludes that he is the father, and leaves while it is flooding. She isn't seen in the episode until Jess and Jordan find her on the beach in labor. They were stuck in the storm and had no way to call emergency services in time, so she was relocated to the beach hut to give birth. She gave birth to her son, Steve Godfrey Littlewood, named after her father. The episode ended with the main Beaker girls cast, Tracy, Cam, Justine (and her newborn son), Peter Ingham, Sean, Jess, Jordan, Si Martin, Mary, Flo, and Tyrone, all celebrating Christmas in the Dumping Ground shop. She was mentioned in Series 13 of the dumping ground where Tracy told Erin, Harmony & Phoenix about Her Time when Justine used to be Her rival.

=== Louise Govern ===
Louise Govern
- The Story of Tracy Beaker character
- Portrayed by: Chelsie Padley
- Duration: 2002–2004, 2021
- First appearance: "Tracy Returns to the Dumping Ground"; 8 January 2002
- Last appearance: "Someday" (2021)
- Introduced by: Cas Lester
In-universe information
- Occupation: Student
- Adoptive father: Mr Morris (foster)
- Adoptive mother: Mrs Morris (foster)
- Grandfathers: Granddad Morris (foster)

Louise Govern, portrayed by Chelsie Padley, made her first appearance in the first episode of series 1. Louise was best friends with Tracy before she was fostered by a couple called Ted and Julie. However, Tracy never contacted Louise whilst she was away, so when Justine Littlewood arrived at the Dumping Ground, she became her new best friend. However, when Tracy returned, she became jealous of Louise and Justine, resulting in arguments and Tracy breaking Justine's clock. Louise leaves after she is fostered by the Morris family, in "The Long Goodbye". However she makes guest appearances in series 3. She also appeared in the "Parties with Pudsey" special in 2004. In 2021, Chelsie reprised her role as Louise in the music video, "Someday". She delivers a pizza to Tracy's house. Neither of them knew who each other were.

=== Adele Azupadi ===
Adele Azupadi
- The Story of Tracy Beaker character
- Portrayed by: Rochelle Gadd
- Duration: 2002–2004
- First appearance: "Tracy Returns to the Dumping Ground"; 8 January 2002
- Last appearance: "Parties with Pudsey" (2004)
- Introduced by: Cas Lester
In-universe information
- Occupation: Student; Shop assistant

Adele Azupadi, portrayed by Rochelle Gadd, made her first appearance in the first episode of series 1. Adele is the eldest resident of the Dumping Ground in the first series and works part-time in a clothing store. Adele is kind though usually keeps herself to herself however she intervenes if she has to.

In the episode "Temporary Care Worker", she reveals that when she went into care for the first time (when she was Maxy's age), she was looked after by Leah, one of the former residents who became the titular temporary care worker in the episode.

Adele returns in series 2, and is seen to be living in a bed-sit on her own. This is until, Tracy visits her and she admits that she is lonely living on her own. Adele then returns to live in the Dumping Ground. She is not seen in series 3, as it is thought that she had now moved out, and back into her bed-sit.

=== Ben Batambuze ===
Ben Batambuze
- The Story of Tracy Beaker character
- Portrayed by: Luke Youngblood
- Duration: 2002–2003
- First appearance: "Tracy Returns to the Dumping Ground"; 8 January 2002
- Last appearance: "Home and Hosed"; 3 April 2003
- Introduced by: Cas Lester
In-universe information
- Occupation: Student
- Father: Mr Batambuze
- Mother: Mrs Batambuze
- Uncles: Jasper
- Aunts: Kate

Ben Batambuze, portrayed by Luke Youngblood, made his first appearance in the first series of The Story of Tracy Beaker.

He is Tracy's best friend. He seems to be living on the streets. However, in the episode, 'The Truth Comes Out', Tracy finds out that Ben has a mum and dad and is left shocked.

Then, in the episode, 'Birthday' he tries to make it up to Tracy by saving her birthday party. He departs in the final episode of series 2.

He did not appear in series 3 but was mentioned by Tracy that he went to boarding school in the first episode of that series 'Leavin' on a Jet Plane'.

=== Peter Ingham ===
Peter Ingham
- The Story of Tracy Beaker character
- Portrayed by: Joe Starrs (2002); Jim English (2021); Wim Snape (2021–2023)
- Duration: 2002, 2021–2023
- First appearance: "Tracy Returns to the Dumping Ground"; 8 January 2002
- Last appearance: "Trial of Tracy Beaker"; 31 March 2023
- Introduced by: Cas Lester
In-universe information
- Occupation: Student; Headteacher
- Adoptive father: Terry Brown (foster)
- Adoptive mother: Jill Brown (foster)

Peter Ingham, portrayed by Joe Starrs, appears in series 1 of The Story of Tracy Beaker.

He likes to think he is Tracy's 'best friend', however Tracy often disagrees and brands him a 'weed'.

In one episode, Jill and Terry Brown, take Tracy out but they decide that they do not want to foster her, but they want to foster Peter instead. They eventually foster him in series 1 in the episode "Cut the Weed, however he returns to the Dumping Ground out of being afraid and missing the Dumping Ground. Tracy convinces him to stay with Jill and Terry Brown.

He made his last appearance in the series 1 finale. It is revealed that he became a headmaster at a school near the coastal town of Cooksea. He made a guest appearance in the third episode of series 1 of My Mum Tracy Beaker, almost 19 years later. He returned in The Beaker Girls, where he is the Headteacher at Jess' new school. He and Tracy kiss in the episode "Telling Stories".

=== Ryan Patterson ===
Ryan Patterson
- The Story of Tracy Beaker character
- Portrayed by: Sonny Muslim
- Duration: 2002
- First appearance: "Tracy Returns to the Dumping Ground"; 8 January 2002
- Last appearance: "The End!"; 4 April 2002
- Introduced by: Cas Lester
In-universe information
- Occupation: Student
- Brothers: Zac Patterson

Ryan Patterson, portrayed by Sonny Muslim, makes his first appearance in the first series of The Story of Tracy Beaker.

Ryan moved to The Dumping Ground with his non-identical twin brother, Zac. He speaks in a Cockney dialect and is interested in judo. He gets up to mischief with his twin Zac, and Maxy. Ryan doesn't usually take no for an answer.

Ryan leaves The Dumping Ground with his brother Zac, between series 1 and 2. It's unknown what happened to Zac and Ryan, though it's likely they were fostered, or went back to their parents.

=== Zac Patterson ===
Zac Patterson
- The Story of Tracy Beaker character
- Portrayed by: Jay Haher
- Duration: 2002
- First appearance: "Tracy Returns to the Dumping Ground"; 8 January 2002
- Last appearance: "The End!"; 4 April 2002
- Introduced by: Cas Lester
In-universe information
- Occupation: Student
- Brothers: Ryan Patterson

Zac Patterson, portrayed by Jay Haher, makes his first appearance in the first series of The Story of Tracy Beaker.

Zac moved to The Dumping Ground with his non-identical twin brother, Ryan. He gets up to mischief with his twin Ryan, and Maxy.

Zac leaves The Dumping Ground with his brother Ryan, between series 1 and 2. It's unknown what happened to Zac and Ryan, though it's likely they were fostered, or went back to their parents.

=== Maxy King ===
Maxy King
- The Story of Tracy Beaker character
- Portrayed by: Jerome Holder
- Duration: 2002
- First appearance: "Tracy Returns to the Dumping Ground"; 8 January 2002
- Last appearance: "The End!"; 4 April 2002
- Introduced by: Cas Lester
In-universe information
- Occupation: Student

Maxy King, portrayed by Jerome Holder, made his first appearance in the first episode of series 1.

He is described as a sweet-loving 7-year-old who used to live in The Dumping Ground.

Maxy leaves in-between Series 1 and 2. He was reportedly fostered by an African family. A snap shot photo of him is seen from the Series 1 episode 'Tracy's Birthday' when Dolly is showing Nathan, Duke's and Jenny's Halloween costumes, in the episode 'Back And Bad', the first episode of series 2. He mentioned at the end of Series 1 he was going to be fostered soon to Jenny, so it's likely he was fostered in between series 1 and 2.

=== Bouncer Plakova ===
Bouncer Plakova
- The Story of Tracy Beaker character
- Portrayed by: Ben Hanson
- Duration: 2003–2005
- First appearance: "Back and Bad"; 7 January 2003
- Last appearance: "The Wedding"; 9 December 2005
- Introduced by: Cas Lester
In-universe information
- Occupation: Student; Chef
- Brothers: Lol Plakova
- Uncles: Luigi
- Aunts: Katrina Plakova

Bradley "Bouncer" Plakova, portrayed by Ben Hanson, made his first appearance on 7 January 2003 in series 2 of The Story of Tracy Beaker during the episode Back and Bad. He departed on 9 December 2005 in series 5 during the episode The Wedding.

Bouncer and his brother Lol are described as kind, funny characters who don't take things too seriously.

Bouncer departs in series 4 when he moves to a Halfway House, which caused tension between him and his brother Lol, resulting in an argument in the episode 'Bouncer VS Lol'.

He later returns in series 5 as a chef at The Dumping Ground. He makes his final appearance in 'The Wedding'.

=== Lol Plakova ===
Lol Plakova
- The Story of Tracy Beaker character
- Portrayed by: Ciaran Joyce
- Duration: 2003–2005
- First appearance: "Back and Bad"; 7 January 2003
- Last appearance: "The Wedding"; 9 December 2005
- Introduced by: Cas Lester
In-universe information
- Occupation: Student; Chef
- Brothers: Bouncer Plakova
- Uncles: Luigi
- Aunts: Katrina Plakova

Lawrence "Lol" Plakova, portrayed by Ciaran Joyce, made his first appearance on 7 January 2003 in series 2 of The Story of Tracy Beaker during the episode Back and Bad. He departed on 9 December 2005 in series 5 during the episode The Wedding. He was referred to as Oliver offhandedly by Jenny in Series 2 and his name Lawrence wasn't revealed until Series 4.

=== Dolly ===
Dolly
- The Story of Tracy Beaker character
- Portrayed by: Chloe Hibbert-Waters
- Duration: 2003
- First appearance: "Back and Bad"; 7 January 2003
- Last appearance: "The Beaker Club"; 4 December 2003
- Introduced by: Cas Lester
In-universe information
- Occupation: Student
- Adoptive father: Philip (foster)
- Adoptive mother: Cathy (foster)
- Sisters: Sophie (foster)

Dolly, portrayed by Chloe Hibbert-Waters, made her first appearance on 7 January 2003 in series 2 of The Story of Tracy Beaker during the episode Back and Bad. She departed on 4 December 2003 in series 3 during the episode The Beaker Club when she gets fostered. When Nathan Jones arrives at The Dumping Ground in the first episode of series 2, to be a trainee care worker, Dolly starts to like him already. She said to Lol that she thinks he's beautiful. After Tracy returns to the Dumping Ground, Dolly begs Tracy to help prank Nathan after he didn't give Dolly her special chocolate biscuit. Tracy and Dolly pretend that there is a 'Saturday Silly Hour' so that Nathan would embarrasses himself at dinner time in front of the kids, Duke and Jenny. Nathan keeps a close eye on Dolly, even though he lost a girlfriend thanks to her.

=== Nathan Jones ===
Nathan Jones
- The Story of Tracy Beaker character
- Portrayed by: James Cartwright
- Duration: 2003–2004
- First appearance: "Back and Bad"; 7 January 2003
- Last appearance: Parties with Pudsey (2004)
- Introduced by: Cas Lester
In-universe information
- Occupation: Careworker
- Spouse: Anna (ex)

Nathan Jones, portrayed by James Cartwright, made his first appearance on 7 January 2003 in series 2 of The Story of Tracy Beaker during the episode Back and Bad. He departed on 1 April 2004 in series 3 during the episode Good as Gold.

He is described as 'lazy and an idiot', by Tracy, but is also described as 'fun', and is more of an older brother, especially to Dolly. Even though Nathan isn't always the most professional care worker, he has proved that he can be serious and has shown that he has got what it takes to be a care worker. Sometimes he can say things that unintentionally upsets or hurts the residents' feelings.

Nathan leaves in-between series 3 and The Movie. It's unknown how or why. He either resigned, got another job in a different care home, or was fired.

=== Amber Hearst ===
Amber Hearst
- The Story of Tracy Beaker character
- Portrayed by: Alicia Hooper
- Duration: 2003–2004
- First appearance: "Alien"; 21 January 2003
- Last appearance: Parties with Pudsey (2004)
- Introduced by: Cas Lester
In-universe information
- Occupation: Student

Amber Hearst, portrayed by Alicia Hooper, made her first appearance on 21 January 2003 in series 2 of The Story of Tracy Beaker during the episode Alien. She departed on 3 April 2003 in the same series during the episode Home and Hosed.

She is described as rebellious, has a bad attitude and is bad-tempered. She often antagonises everyone else at the Dumping Ground. Amber has had a difficult life and has lived in many care homes, and ran away from all of them before moving into Stowey House. Even though Amber doesn't have any close friends at the Dumping Ground she does have a few on and off friendships with Tracy Beaker and Justine Littlewood. In 'The Long Goodbye' she meets Colin and Selima and gets on with them.

She made her final appearance in the episode 'Home and Hosed'. It's unknown what happened to her as she had left off screen, and none of the other characters mentioned her since. It could be assumed that she gets fostered by Colin and Selima.

=== Crash Watkins ===
Crash Watkins
- The Story of Tracy Beaker character
- Portrayed by: Darragh Mortell
- Duration: 2003–2006
- First appearance: "Leavin' on a Jet Plane"; 25 September 2003
- Last appearance: "Children's Party at the Palace"; 25 June 2006
- Introduced by: Jane Dauncey
In-universe information
- Occupation: Student
- Father: Theo

Liam "Crash" Watkins, portrayed by Darragh Mortell, made his first appearance on 9 October 2003 in series 3 of The Story of Tracy Beaker during the episode Leavin' on a Jet Plane. He departed on 9 December 2005 in series 5 during the episode The Wedding. However, he made his final ever appearance in Children's Party at the Palace for Queen Elizabeth's 80th birthday in 2006

Crash has quite a bad and short temper, due to his background and life before he lived in care. Crash's father was also very angry and short tempered after his wife (Crash's mother) left, and he took his anger out of Crash. He has quite a few close friends in the Dumping Ground. Crash was the first resident to make an effort in making friends with Jackie Hopper when she first arrived. Crash later became close friends with Tracy, Lol and Bouncer.

=== Michael Grice ===
Michael Grice
- The Story of Tracy Beaker character
- Portrayed by: William Tomlin
- Duration: 2003–2004
- First appearance: "Leavin' on a Jet Plane"; 25 September 2003
- Last appearance: Parties with Pudsey (2004)
- Introduced by: Jane Dauncey
In-universe information
- Occupation: Student
- Brothers: James Grice

Michael Grice, portrayed by William Tomlin, made his first appearance on 25 September 2003 in series 3 of The Story of Tracy Beaker during the episode Leavin' on a Jet Plane. He departed on 9 December 2005 in series 3 during the episode Good as Gold.

Michael has few redeeming qualities, he bullies and snitches on everyone and usually only does things to please himself. Due to his hostile personality, Michael isn't seen to have many close friends; he's known to be particularly spiteful to Jackie, often mocking her about her sick grandfather and her constant attempts to run away. He's also been known to provoke Crash on a number of occasions.

He makes his final appearance at the end of the series and didn't return for the movie or series 4.

=== Marco Maloney ===
Marco Maloney
- The Story of Tracy Beaker character
- Portrayed by: Jack Edwards
- Duration: 2003–2005
- First appearance: "Leavin' on a Jet Plane"; 25 September 2003
- Last appearance: "Two's a Crowd"; 8 December 2005
- Introduced by: Jane Dauncey
In-universe information
- Occupation: Student
- Adoptive father: Mr Boxer (foster)
- Adoptive mother: Mrs Boxer (foster)
- Sisters: Milly (foster)

Marco Maloney, portrayed by Jack Edwards, made his first appearance on 25 September 2003 in series 3 of The Story of Tracy Beaker during the episode Leavin' on a Jet Plane. He departed on 8 December 2005 in series 5 during the episode Two's a Crowd.

He often wears costumes and dress-up, and is always wearing new and original costumes. He is often described as 'weird' and 'crazy' by other people who live at The Dumping Ground.

He is best friends with Milly and gets fostered with Milly by the Boxer family in the episode 'Two's a Crowd'

=== Hayley Sparks ===
Hayley Sparks
- The Story of Tracy Beaker character
- Portrayed by: Kristal Lau
- Duration: 2003–2005
- First appearance: "Leavin' on a Jet Plane"; 25 September 2003
- Last appearance: "Beam Me Up, Scottie"; 4 January 2005
- Introduced by: Jane Dauncey
In-universe information
- Occupation: Student
- Adoptive father: Mark (foster)
- Adoptive mother: Helen (foster)

Hayley Sparks, portrayed by Kristal Lau, made her first appearance on 25 September 2003 in series 3 of The Story of Tracy Beaker during the episode Leavin' on a Jet Plane. She departed on 4 January 2005 in series 4 during the episode Beam Me Up, Scottie.

Hayley is described as quiet, she often gets annoyed when she is ignored.

She made her final appearance in 'Beam Me Up, Scottie', when she moved in with her foster parents, Mark and Helen.

=== Layla ===
Layla
- The Story of Tracy Beaker character
- Portrayed by: Cara Readle
- Duration: 2003–2005
- First appearance: "Leavin' on a Jet Plane"; 25 September 2003
- Last appearance: "The Wedding"; 9 December 2005
- Introduced by: Jane Dauncey
In-universe information
- Occupation: Student

Layla, portrayed by Cara Readle, made her first appearance on 25 September 2003 in series 3 of The Story of Tracy Beaker during the episode Leavin' on a Jet Plane. She departed on 9 December 2005 in series 5 during the episode The Wedding.

Layla is a quiet girl with cerebral palsy and is described as a kind and caring person, although gets upset very quickly, especially when Hayley left without telling her.

She made her final appearance in 'The Wedding'. It is unknown what happened to her after leaving in care.

=== Shelley Appleton ===
Shelley Appleton
- The Story of Tracy Beaker character
- Portrayed by: Nicola Reynolds
- Duration: 2003-2004, 2005
- First appearance: "Leavin' on a Jet Plane"; 25 September 2003
- Last appearance: "Operation Careworker"; 6 December 2005
- Introduced by: Jane Dauncey (2003); Josephine Ward (2005)
In-universe information
- Occupation: Head Careworker

Shelley Appleton, portrayed by Nicola Reynolds, made her first appearance on 9 October 2003 in series 3 of The Story of Tracy Beaker during the episode Leavin' on a Jet Plane, and replaced Jenny Edwards as the head-care worker. She departed on 1 April 2004 in series 3 during the episode Good as Gold. Shelley returned on 2 December 2005 in series 5 during the episode Telling Tales. She departed on 6 December 2005 in series 5 during the episode Operation Careworker.

She has a cool, collected and confident attitude, but ultimately has a huge affection for all the kids. In series 3, it is mentioned that she became interested in being a careworker because she cared for her dad as a child, because he had Alzheimer's disease.

=== Jackie Hopper ===
Jackie Hopper
- The Story of Tracy Beaker character
- Portrayed by: Abby Rakic-Platt
- Duration: 2003–2005
- First appearance: "Jackie"; 9 October 2003
- Last appearance: "The Wedding"; 9 December 2005
- Introduced by: Jane Dauncey
In-universe information
- Occupation: Student
- Mother: Norma
- Grandfathers: Jack Hopper

Jackie Hopper, portrayed by Abby Rakic-Platt, made her first appearance on 9 October 2003 in series 3 of The Story of Tracy Beaker during the episode Jackie. She departed on 9 December 2005 in series 4 during the episode The Wedding.

When Jackie is brought to the Dumping Ground, she refuses to accept that she needs to be in care, and that her beloved grandad has Alzheimer's and can no longer look after her. She's determined to escape, collect her Grandpa from his nursing home and return to their old house together. Eventually, she ends up staying at the Dumping Ground even though she doesn't like it. She later becomes good friends with Tracy and Crash. Jackie's grandad dies in The Finishing Line (series 4; episode 7), which Tracy supports her to come to terms with.

She departs during the final episode of series 4, to attend a sports academy, however returns in series 5 after admitting she faked an injury to return to the Dumping Ground.

=== Sid Rooney ===
Sid Rooney
- The Story of Tracy Beaker character
- Portrayed by: Vincenzo Pellegrino
- Duration: 2004–2005
- First appearance: "Return to Sender"; 7 October 2004
- Last appearance: "We're Off the Map Now"; 5 April 2005
- Introduced by: Jane Dauncey
In-universe information
- Occupation: Head Careworker

Sid Rooney, portrayed by Vincenzo Pellegrino, made his first appearance on 7 October 2004 in series 4 of The Story of Tracy Beaker during the episode Return to Sender, and replaced Shelley Appleton as head-care worker. He departed on 5 April 2005 in series 4 during the episode We're off the Map Now.

Sid is described as being very boring, but when he takes a few days' break and leaves the Dumping Ground in the care of a draconian careworker, they realise they are lucky to have him, and welcome him back.

He made his last appearance in the final episode of series 4.

=== Chantal Wellard ===
Chantal Wellard
- The Story of Tracy Beaker character
- Portrayed by: Deepal Parmar
- Duration: 2004–2005
- First appearance: "Return to Sender"; 7 October 2004
- Last appearance: "Chantal's Goodbye"; 29 November 2005
- Introduced by: Jane Dauncey
In-universe information
- Occupation: Student
- Father: Chantal's dad
- Half-brothers: Rio Wellard
- Half-sisters: Roxy Wellard

Chantal Wellard, portrayed by Deepal Parmar, made her first appearance on 7 October 2004 in series 4 of The Story of Tracy Beaker during the episode Return to Sender. She departed on 29 November 2005 in series 5 during the episode Chantal's Goodbye.

Social worker Elaine Boyak (Nisha Nayar) brings Chantal and her half-brother, Rio Wellard (Craig Roberts), and her half-sister, Roxy Wellard (Sophie Borja), to The Dumping Ground on the day the young people move from Stowey House to Cliffside. Bouncer Plakova (Ben Hanson) and Lol Plakova (Ciaran Joyce), who used to be in care with them, are initially determined to stand up to them, but back down as care worker Duke Ellington (Clive Rowe) recalls their behaviour on a visit to a care home they were at; head care worker Sid Rooney (Vincenzo Pellegrino) decides to give Chantal, Rio and Roxy a chance, but Chantal starts an egg fight with Marco Maloney (Jack Edwards) and demand sweets from the others. When they go to argue with Crash (Darragh Mortell), Tracy Beaker (Dani Harmer) and the other young people stand up to them. The Wellards encourage Jackie Hopper (Abby Rakic-Platt) to steal their files to destroy, but when she is caught by Sid, she and Crash post fake files about The Wellards. Crash and Jackie decide to kill the Wellards with kindness instead of fighting with them, so Jackie does not get angry with Chantal when she takes her jacket, but Chantal becomes emotional when Jackie lends her a pair of her trainers. The Wellards intercept letters from Bouncer to trainee care workerJane (Evelyn Duah) and write back, pretending to be Jane, asking for presents. When The Dumping Ground has an inspection, the Wellards devise a plan to get it shut down by pretending they are mistreated, but it backfires when Tracy informs the inspector, Mr Pincher (Keiron Self), it's a set up. Lol sets up a mock talk show when Chantal steals Crash's mum's engagement ring. The girls separate themselves from the boys, but are brought together by their hatred for Elaine. Jealous with Tracy receiving money from her foster grandmother, the young people invite two elderly people from an old peoples home in order to get money, but they fail when the elderly people figure out what they are up to.

Unlike her younger siblings, who are both white, Chantal appears to be of Indian descent.

=== Rio Wellard ===
Rio Wellard
- The Story of Tracy Beaker character
- Portrayed by: Craig Roberts
- Duration: 2004–2005
- First appearance: "Return to Sender"; 7 October 2004
- Last appearance: "The Wedding"; 9 December 2005
- Introduced by: Jane Dauncey
In-universe information
- Occupation: Student
- Half-sisters: Chantal Wellard; Roxy Wellard

Rio Wellard, portrayed by Craig Roberts, made his first appearance on 7 October 2004 in series 4 of The Story of Tracy Beaker during the episode Return to Sender. He departed on 9 December 2005 in series 5 during the episode The Wedding.

Rio is feisty but kind. He is close to his half sisters Roxy and Chantal, and is a rebellious bully at first and immediately argues with Crash. In Series 5, Chantal then leaves the Dumping Ground. He then becomes more open with the other care kids and makes friends with Crash. Him and Roxy often dream big. He is a main part in Roxy's schemes. He is very protective over Roxy and cares for her even though they fight at times.

He makes his final appearance in 'The Wedding'.

=== Roxy Wellard ===
Roxy Wellard
- The Story of Tracy Beaker character
- Portrayed by: Sophie Borja
- Duration: 2004–2005
- First appearance: "Return to Sender"; 7 October 2004
- Last appearance: "The Wedding"; 9 December 2005
- Introduced by: Jane Dauncey
In-universe information
- Occupation: Student
- Half-brothers: Rio Wellard
- Half-sisters: Chantal Wellard

Roxy Wellard, portrayed by Sophie Borja, made her first appearance on 7 October 2004 in series 4 of The Story of Tracy Beaker during the episode Return to Sender. She departed on 9 December 2005 in series 5 during the episode The Wedding.

Roxy is the youngest of her siblings but often takes control. Roxy is described as a stereotypical goth. She is always seen wearing black and white, a high ponytail fastened with either a bronze, pink or black feathery flower band and sometimes earrings. However, her face looks innocent but her "bad girl" look makes her intimidating. Her age is unknown but is about 8 or 9 as she looks older than she actually is.

She makes her final appearance in 'The Wedding'.

=== Wolfie ===
Wolfie
- The Story of Tracy Beaker character
- Portrayed by: Felix Drake
- Duration: 2005
- First appearance: "Independence Day"; 15 March 2005
- Last appearance: "The Wedding"; 9 December 2005
- Introduced by: Jane Dauncey
In-universe information
- Occupation: Student

Shawn "Wolfie", portrayed by Felix Drake, made his first appearance on 15 March 2005 in series 4 of The Story of Tracy Beaker during the episode 'Independence Day'. He departed on 9 December 2005 in series 5 during the episode 'The Wedding'.

He does not like sleeping in a bed, and suffers from claustrophobia, as he hates being locked in. He makes friends with Lol shortly after his arrival, which annoys Lol's brother, Bouncer.

=== Rebecca Chalmers ===
Rebecca Chalmers
- The Story of Tracy Beaker character
- Portrayed by: Georgina Hagen
- Duration: 2005
- First appearance: "Caring and Sharing"; 28 November 2005
- Last appearance: "The Wedding"; 9 December 2005
- Introduced by: Josephine Ward
In-universe information
- Occupation: Student
- Half-brothers: Jake

Rebecca Chalmers, portrayed by Georgina Hagen, made her first appearance on 28 November 2005 in series 5 of The Story of Tracy Beaker during the episode 'Caring and Sharing'. She departed on 9 December 2005 in series 5 during the episode 'The Wedding'.

Rebecca doesn't get on with many people, primarily Justine. She is quite a troublemaker, and likes to stir things up.

=== Milly ===
Milly
- The Story of Tracy Beaker character
- Portrayed by: Holly Gibbs
- Duration: 2005
- First appearance: "Scary Milly"; 30 November 2005
- Last appearance: "Two's a Crowd"; 8 December 2005
- Introduced by: Josephine Ward
In-universe information
- Occupation: Student
- Adoptive father: Mr Boxer (foster)
- Adoptive mother: Mrs Boxer (foster)
- Brothers: Marco Maloney (foster)

Milly, portrayed by Holly Gibbs, made her first appearance on 30 November 2005 in series 5 of The Story of Tracy Beaker during the episode Scary Milly. She departed on 8 December 2005 in series 5 during the episode Two's a Crowd.

Upon her arrival, the other people at the Dumping Ground assume she is 'cursed' due to strange events that keep happening that day. She quickly befriends Marco. Milly never speaks, and only spoke when Elaine asked if she wanted to be fostered.

She departed in series 5 during the episode 'Two's A Crowd'.

=== Alice ===
Alice
- The Story of Tracy Beaker character
- Portrayed by: Olive Gray
- Duration: 2005
- First appearance: "Frankelainestein"; 1 December 2005
- Last appearance: "The Wedding"; 9 December 2005
- Introduced by: Josephine Ward
In-universe information
- Occupation: Student

Alice, portrayed by Olive Gray, made her first appearance on 1 December 2005 in series 5 of The Story of Tracy Beaker during the episode Return to Sender. She departed on 9 December 2005 in series 5 during the episode The Wedding.

Alice arrives at The Dumping Ground with social worker Elaine (Nisha Nayar) and Alice is happy to be sharing a room with Layla (Cara Readle). Alice tells Layla about her tooth fairy and shows her her fairy palace, which Roxy (Sophie Borja) insults. After Elaine's visit to a life coach, she unintentionally upsets Alice by throwing out her fairy palace, but helps mend it. After Roxy and her half-brother, Rio (Craig Roberts), and Rebecca (Georgina Hagen) find out Wolfie (Felix Drake) has unwanted money from his parents, they use Alice to help make friends with him and Alice is angry that they only want Wolfie for his money. After Roxy ruins Layla's bag, Alice lends her necklace, which she claims has mystical powers and a dog turns up at The Dumping Ground, which the young people want to keep. A set of foster parents decide to foster the dog, which is named Tracy after Tracy (Dani Harmer), after the young people try to impress them. When Elaine is iced, Justine (Montanna Thompson) attempts to discover who was responsible to prevent everyone being grounded by Shelley (Nicola Reynolds) and Alice soon confesses she was responsible as she did not want to go out with foster parents who do not believe in fairies. When Shelley asks for the person to own up, everyone claims they did it. When Shelley is about to leave, interviews are held for the new head careworker and Alice dislikes one of the candidates, Lucy, who everyone else likes. Roxy supports Alice by making a story up that Lucy worked at her old care home and mistreated a boy. Bouncer (Ben Hanson) returns to The Dumping Ground as chef, but the young people hate his food, apart from Alice and Rio. When a cooking competition between Bouncer and Mike (Connor Byrne) is suggested, Alice and Rio are selected to try their food, but the young people begin to like Bouncer's food and join in with Alice's meditating. When Tracy puts chilli powder in Bouncer's food and Alice eats it, she starts a food fight. At Lol's (Ciaran Joyce) leaving party, Alice does palm reading, but upsets Tracy and Justine with her predictions. Alice attends Cam (Lisa Coleman) and Gary's (George McAllister) wedding.

== Recurring characters ==
=== Steve Littlewood ===
Steve Littlewood
- The Story of Tracy Beaker character
- Portrayed by: Stephen Crossley (2002–2004); Morgan Hopkins (2005)
- Duration: 2002–2005
- First appearance: "Tracy Returns to the Dumping Ground"; 8 January 2002
- Last appearance: "Two's A Crowd"; 8 December 2005
- Introduced by: Cas Lester (2002); Josephine Ward (2005)
In-universe information
- Wife: Carrie 2003-2021
- Sons: Billy
- Daughters: Justine Littlewood
- Grandsons: Steve Godfrey Littlewood
- Nephews: John

Steve Littlewood, portrayed by Stephen Crossley from 2002 to 2004 and Morgan Hopkins in 2005, made his first appearance on 8 January 2002 in series 1 of The Story of Tracy Beaker during the episode Tracy Returns to the Dumping Ground. He departed in series 5 during the episode Two's A Crowd.

Steve introduces his new girlfriend Carrie (Caroline Bunce) to his daughter, Justine (Montanna Thompson); however, Carrie isn't well-received by Justine. When Carrie and Steve are getting married, Justine is their bridesmaid; however, Justine isn't happy with the dress and the young people decide to alter it. Tracy (Dani Harmer), Louise (Chelsie Padley) and Amber (Alicia Hooper) make a mess of the dress, but Adele (Rochelle Gadd) manages to fix it. Pizza is thrown at Justine's dress when a "better than posh restaurant party" backfires and turns into a food fight, resulting in Justine refusing to go to the wedding, but Tracy and Lol (Ciaran Joyce) talk her round and Justine gets to their wedding in time.

When Steve cancels taking Justine out, Carrie visits Justine and she breaks the news to Justine that she is pregnant and Justine doesn't take it well. Carrie later tells Justine that the real reason for her visit is that once she and Steve are organised, they want her to live with them. Justine suspects that her dad and Carrie are going to tell her some bad news when he takes her out for dinner due to Steve buying her things, however, it turns out to be good news when Steve and Carrie tell Justine they want her to move in the following week. At Justine's farewell party, Justine gets fed up when her dad and Carrie go on about the baby and she soon snaps. Steve and Carrie later apologise to her for doing so during her party.

When Steve's nephew, John (Adam Skilton) turns up, Justine is uncomfortable and when Justine has to give up her room, Carrie tells Justine it is her father's decision and Justine decides to move back to The Dumping Ground. Elaine (Nisha Nayer) sets up a meeting between Steve and Justine, but lies to Justine that she wants her photo taken and Justine is displeased when she discovers Elaine has lied to her. On Special Guests Day, Justine is unhappy when her father brings John along. When John has an allergic reaction to nuts, Justine gives John his injection and John apologises to Justine. In 2021, in The Beaker Girls it was revealed by Justine that Steve had dementia. Subsequently in the final episode after a time shift to a few months later, it was announced that Steve had died from dementia. In honour of her late father, Justine gave birth to a baby boy whom she called Steve Godfrey Littlewood in memory of her father.

=== Carrie ===
Carrie
- The Story of Tracy Beaker character
- Portrayed by: Caroline Bunce (2003–2004); Kathryn Dimery (2005)
- Duration: 2003–2005
- First appearance: "Doggie"; 23 January 2003
- Last appearance: "Caring and Sharing"; 28 November 2005
- Introduced by: Cas Lester (2003); Josephine Ward (2005)
In-universe information
- Husband: Steve Littlewood
- Sons: Billy
- Stepdaughters: Justine Littlewood
- Grandsons: Steve Godfrey Littlewood (step)
- Nephews: John

Carrie, portrayed by Caroline Bunce from 2003 to 2004 and Kathryn Dimery in 2005, made her first appearance on 23 January 2003 in series 2 of The Story of Tracy Beaker during the episode Doggie. She departed in series 5 during the episode Caring and Sharing.

Steve (Stephen Crossley) introduces Carrie to his daughter, Justine (Montanna Thompson), however, Carrie is not well received by Justine. When Carrie and Steve are getting married, Justine is their bridesmaid, however, Justine isn't happy with the dress and the kids decide to alter it. Tracy (Dani Harmer), Louise (Chelsie Padley) and Amber (Alicia Hooper) make a mess of the dress, but Adele (Rochelle Gadd) manages to fix it. Pizza is thrown at Justine's dress when a "better than posh restaurant party" backfires and turns into a food fight, resulting in Justine refusing to go to the wedding, but Tracy and Lol (Ciaran Joyce) talk her round and Justine gets to their wedding in time.

When Steve cancels taking Justine out, Carrie visits Justine and she breaks the news to Justine that she is pregnant and Justine doesn't take it well. Carrie later tells Justine that the real reason for her visit is that once she and Steve are organised, they want her to live with them. Justine suspects that her dad and Carrie are going to tell her some bad news when he takes her out for dinner due to Steve buying her things, however, it turns out to be good news when Carrie and Steve tell Justine they want her to move in the following week. At Justine's farewell party, Justine gets fed up when her dad and Carrie go on about the baby and she soon snaps. Carrie and Steve later apologise to her for doing so during her party.

When Steve's nephew, John (Adam Skilton) turns up, Justine is uncomfortable and when Justine has to give up her room, Carrie tells Justine it is her father's decision and Justine decides to move back to The Dumping Ground.

== Others ==
Series 1 (2002)
Character	Date(s)	Actor	Circumstances
Julie	8 January 2002	Louise Barrett	Julie and Ted are the former foster parents of Tracy (Dani Harmer). Julie and Ted are unable to continue fostering Tracy as Julie is pregnant, and they are aware that Tracy got into trouble in her last foster home for shutting a baby in a cupboard.
Ted	8 January 2002	Kim MacDonald	Julie and Ted are the former foster parents of Tracy (Dani Harmer). Julie and Ted are unable to continue fostering Tracy as Julie is pregnant, and they are aware that Tracy got into trouble in her last foster home for shutting a baby in a cupboard.
Brian Gee	22 January 2002	Simon Ludders	A photographer who takes pictures of Tracy (Dani Harmer) and Louise (Chelsie Padley) for Child of the Week.
Ben's Mum	24 January 2002 – 18 March 2003	Natasha Estelle Williams	When Ben (Luke Youngblood) injures himself by falling out of a tree, Mike (Connor Byrne) takes him home. Tracy isn't happy with Ben when the arrive at a large house and that he lied that he lived on the streets. Tracy plots with Ben to get his mum to foster her by pretending that life is horrible at The Dumping Ground and being well behaved. On Ben's birthday, his mum and his dad are called into work. When Ben's mum drops Ben's mobile of at The Dumping Ground, Amber (Alicia Hooper) teases Ben and thinks he is a wuss. Amber pressures Ben to hold a party in his parents absence.
Miss Sharp	31 January 2002 – 26 February 2002	Ysobel Gonzalez	Miss Sharp is Tracy's (Dani Harmer) teacher. She appears in a flashback when Tracy was a new girl at school and Miss Sharp introduces Tracy to the class, but no one wants to be her friend. On parents evening, Tracy gives Elaine (Nisha Nayer) the wrong time and pretends to Cam (Lisa Coleman) that a sponsored welly throw is happening at school. When Cam arrives at school, she finds out from Miss Sharp that it is parents evening and Miss Sharp shows Cam some of Tracy's homework. Cam also discovers that Tracy told Miss Sharp that she will be fostering Tracy soon.
Terry Brown	5 February 2002 – 26 March 2002	Paul Mari	Terry and Jill Brown are a couple who decide to take Tracy (Dani Harmer) out, however Tracy is too lively for them. Tracy is angry when she overhears Mike Milligan (Connor Byrne) and Jenny (Sharlene Whyte) tell Elaine (Nisha Nayer) that Peter (Joe Starrs) would be better suited to Terry and Jill. When Tracy teachers Peter to be bad, he misbehaves when Terry and Jill come round, however Tracy admits that Peter's bad behaviour was down to her and they should take Peter out. Peter is fostered by Terry and Jill.
Jill Brown	5 February 2002 – 26 March 2002	Maggie Wells	
Shoe Shop Assistant	5 March 2002	Jody Jameson	When Maxy's (Jerome Holder) shoes break, Jenny (Sharlene Whyte) takes him shopping for a new pair and the Shoe Shop Assistant helps them out. Maxy wants some red and black trainers, but Jenny insists on trying other pairs as the ones he likes don't look strong. Maxy tries out several pairs, but pretend they don't fit or hurt him.
Mr Pugh	7 March 2002	Max Digby	Mr Pugh is Tracy's (Dani Harmer) teacher. He appears in flashbacks when Tracy is trying to explain the disappearance of her homework.
Samantha	12 March 2002	Imogen Brown	Samantha is an 11-year-old girl who arrives at The Dumping Ground late at night when her mum (Isobel Middleton) is rushed into hospital with suspected appendicitis. Louise (Chelsie Padley) offers to share a room with Samantha, however, Louise isn't keen on her when Samantha goes through the stuff her mum doesn't like her to have or do. Samantha strikes up a friendship with Tracy (Dani Harmer) and Samantha teaches Tracy to cheerlead. Jenny (Sharlene Whyte) informs Samantha that her mum has been discharged from hospital after a false alarm. When her mum picks her up, she is horrified that Samantha has cut her hair and Samantha is grounded for a month.
Samantha's Mum	12 March 2002	Isobel Middleton	When Samantha's mum is discharged from hospital, she collects Samantha (Imogen Brown) from The Dumping Ground. Samantha's mum is horrified when she sees how short Samantha has cut her hair and she grounds Samantha for a month.
Leah	21 March 2002	Louisa Milwood Haigh	Leah is a temporary careworker, who fills in for Jenny (Sharlene Whyte) when she is off work. The residents make up stories about Leah's past. When Leah holds a meeting with the kids, they make up fun rules, however, Leah outsmarts them as she suggests a few creative rules. On a shopping trip, the kids run off from her, however Adele (Rochelle Gadd) tells Tracy (Dani Harmer) and Peter (Joe Starrs) that Leah was a former care kid who looked after her and they are helping Leah get into trouble. A frantic Leah phones Duke when all the kids show up.
Martha Leach	4 April 2002	Paula Bacon	Martha is an estate agent, who shows Cam (Lisa Coleman) some flats.

Series 2 (2003)
Character	Date(s)	Actor	Circumstances
Nathan's Lecturer	14 January 2003	Gerri Smith	The university lecturer of Nathan (James Cartwright). She is surprised what Nathan has turned in for his coursework, nut roast and pickle taped on paper which was done by Tracy (Dani Harmer) and Dolly (Chloe Hibbert-Waters).
Vikram Singh	23 January 2003	Gurmail Garib Singh	Vikram is a boy, who has lost his dog named Fang. Fang has been hanging around The Dumping Ground and Dolly (Chloe Hibbert-Waters) becomes attached to him, so Tracy (Dani Harmer) helps Dolly smuggle Fang inside. Tracy gets Cam (Lisa Coleman) to look after Fang, but she soon returns him to Vikram. Vikram gives them £10 as a reward.
Gang Girls	23 January 2003	Emily Carter; Lowri Jenkins; Nadine Marie Egal	The friends of Amber (Alicia Hooper).
Anna	6 February 2003	Charlotte Lowri	Anna is the girlfriend of Nathan (James Cartwright), who Dolly (Chloe Hibbert-Waters) is jealous of. During a game of truth or dare, Dolly gets Nathan to admit that she is his favourite person. Dolly gets Tracy (Dani Harmer) to admit to Anna that Nathan said he liked someone better than her in truth or dare, not knowing that he said it Dolly. Anna breaks up with Nathan.
Gordon	11 February 2003	Roderick Smith	Gordon is the father of Warren (Leighton Smith). He is annoyed with Dolly (Chloe Hibbert-Waters) when she lets the animals out of their pens, but Tracy (Dani Harmer) takes the blame.
Warren	11 February 2003	Leighton Morgan	Warren is the son of Gordon (Roderick Smith), who shows Dolly (Chloe Hibbert-Waters) the farm. Adele (Rochelle Gadd) is attracted to Warren.
Mr Byron	18 February 2003	Sule Rimi	When Cam (Lisa Coleman) is ill, Tracy (Dani Harmer), with well intentions, takes over Cam's life and she delivers one of Cam's incomplete stories to the publishers and gives it Mr Byron.
Receptionist	18 February 2003	Portia Nicholson	The receptionist of the publishers who tells Tracy (Dani Harmer) who Mr Byron (Sule Rimi) is.
Celebrant	25 February 2003	Duncan Betts	The celebrant who performs Steve (Stephen Crossley) and Carrie's (Caroline Bunce) wedding.
Quiz Kids	27 February 2003	Calum Fowler; Natasha Marshall	Kids from another care home who compete against the Stowey House team in a quiz.
Derrick	4 March 2003	Jonathan Davies	Derrick and Jamie are Adele's (Rochelle Gadd) boyfriends. Derrick and Jamie find out that Adele is dating them both when they turn up at The Dumping Ground together.
Jamie	4 March 2003	Mohammed Hadan	Derrick and Jamie are Adele's (Rochelle Gadd) boyfriends. Derrick and Jamie find out that Adele is dating them both when they turn up at The Dumping Ground together.
Ben's Dad	4 March 2003	Kevin McCurdy	On Ben's (Luke Youngblood) birthday, his dad and his mum are called into work.
Mr Morris	13 March 2003 – 25 March 2003	Rhys Parry Jones	Mr Morris is the potential foster father of Louise (Chelsie Padley). Louise and Tracy (Dani Harmer) join Mr Morris and his family on a picnic and Tracy questions Mr and Mrs Morris (Kerry Joy Stewart) about themselves. When Louise leaves, Mr and Mrs Morris collect Louise from The Dumping Ground.
Mrs Morris	13 March 2003 – 16 October 2003	Kerry Joy Stewart	Mrs Morris is the potential foster mother of Louise (Chelsie Padley). Louise and Tracy (Dani Harmer) join Mrs Morris and her family on a picnic and Tracy questions Mrs and Mr Morris (Kerry Joy Stewart) about themselves. When Louise leaves, Mrs and Mr Morris collect Louise from The Dumping Ground. When Louise visits her friends, Louise makes out that her foster family are horrible so it doesn't appear that she is boasting. Tracy and Justine (Montanna Thompson) go to the park to rescue Louise and Louise admits that the Morris' aren't horrible.
Granddad Morris	13 March 2003	Tony Leader	When Mr Morris (Rhys Parry Jones) and Mrs Morris (Kerry Joy Stuart) take potential foster daughter Louise (Chelsie Padley) out, Louise brings Tracy (Dani Harmer) along. Granddad Morris stays at The Dumping Ground and he teachers Bouncer (Ben Hanson) and Lol some survival skills, which Duke (Clive Rowe) falls foul of. Mr Morris leaves The Dumping Ground with Bouncer and Lol's gameboy.
Gang	18 March 2003	Emily Carter; James Marshall	2 of Amber's (Alicia Hooper) friends, who Amber brings to Ben's (Luke Youngblood party. They vandalize pictures and statues at Ben's house.
Jasper	20 March 2003 – 3 April 2003	Declan Wilson	Jasper and Kate are the uncle and aunt of Ben (Luke Youngblood). Ben invites Tracy (Dani Harmer) round and Tracy makes up to Kate and Jasper that her mum is rich and lives in Hollywood. When they go to the funfair and beach, Kate believes that Tracy is spoilt and rude. Tracy runs off and Ben defends Tracy to his uncle and aunt. Jasper and Kate go to The Dumping Ground and Kate apologises for what she said and they invite Tracy to go out with them the following day. Elaine (Nisha Nayer) tells Tracy that Jasper and Kate want to foster her and Tracy is pleased with the news and the residents put Jasper and Kate through some tests to see if they are ideal for Tracy. When Tracy learns that she would be moving to Scotland, she asks Cam (Lisa Coleman) what she should do and Cam tells Jasper and Kate to look after Tracy. Tracy decides to go to Scotland for a holiday before coming back to The Dumping Ground permanently.
Kate	20 March 2003 – 3 April 2003	Tracy Williams	
Colin	25 March 2003	Brendan Charleson	Colin is a friend of Duke's (Clive Rowe), who lends his lawn mower to Duke. Amber (Alicia Hooper) crashes Colin's motor, so his girlfriend, Selima brings a toolbox to The Dumping Ground. Amber is impressed with Selima's motorbike and Amber persuades Duke (Clive Hill) to let her ride it with Selima. Tracy (Dani Harmer) later hints to Elaine (Nisha Nayer) that Colin and Selima could be ideal foster parents for Amber.
Selima	25 March 2003	Claire Cage	Colin is a friend of Duke's (Clive Rowe), who lends his lawn mower to Duke. Amber (Alicia Hooper) crashes Colin's motor, so his girlfriend, Selima brings a toolbox to The Dumping Ground. Amber is impressed with Selima's motorbike and Amber persuades Duke (Clive Hill) to let her ride it with Selima. Tracy (Dani Harmer) later hints to Elaine (Nisha Nayer) that Colin and Selima could be ideal foster parents for Amber.

Series 3 (2003–2004)
Character	Date(s)	Actor	Circumstances
Jack Hopper	23 October 2003 – 25 January 2005	Howell Evans	Jack Hopper is the grandfather of Jackie Hopper (Abby Rakic-Platt). Crash (Darragh Mortell) goes with Jackie on her first visit to see her grandpa when Shelley is unable to arrange anyone to go with her. Jackie doesn't believe her grandpa needs looking after, however, Crash tells her that he forgot who she was. Jackie plans a way to get her grandpa home with Tracy (Dani Harmer) and Tracy is puzzled when Jack keeps referring to Jackie as Norma (Jackie's mother and possibly his daughter/daughter-in-law). When they get home, the find an Estate Agent in the house and Jack orders her to leave. Shelley turns up at the house unexpectedly and Shelley explains to Jackie how her grandpa can no longer look after her. Jackie cancels her grandpa's first visit to The Dumping Ground, however, Crash secretly arranges for Jack to come. Jackie pretends not to like The Dumping Ground to her grandpa and she tells him that she didn't want to seem settled in case it upset him. Jackie participates in a charity run with her grandpa but Jack has a turn and cannot complete the race, so Jackie completes it for him. When Jackie finds out that her grandpa needs a wheelchair, she believes he doesn't need it. When Jack is taken home, he wants his trainers to be thrown away, however, Crash throws his slippers away and Jack gets Jackie and Crash to race him in his wheelchair. Jackie is devastated when her grandpa dies.
Mr Bygrave	23 October 2003	David Charles	Mr and Mrs Bygrave are potential foster parents for Tracy (Dani Harmer, but Tracy isn't keen on them. Tracy gets Elaine (Nisha Nayer) to set up a meeting and she and Justine (Montanna Thompson) trick Michael (William Tomlin) to go out with them instead. Tracy and Justine's plan backfires and they are forced to apologise to them by Shelley (Nicola Reynolds).
Mrs Bygrave	23 October 2003	Rachel Atkins	Mr and Mrs Bygrave are potential foster parents for Tracy (Dani Harmer, but Tracy isn't keen on them. Tracy gets Elaine (Nisha Nayer) to set up a meeting and she and Justine (Montanna Thompson) trick Michael (William Tomlin) to go out with them instead. Tracy and Justine's plan backfires and they are forced to apologise to them by Shelley (Nicola Reynolds).
Estate Agent	13 November 2003	Vivienne Rowdon	An Estate Agent who is found in Jack's (Howell Evans) house by him, Jackie (Abby Rakic-Platt) and Tracy (Dani Harmer). Jack has no recollection of signing the papers due to his Alzheimer's and insists the Estate Agent gets out of his house.
Vicky	20 November 2003	Jennifer Robinson	Vicky is a girl on the same ward as Tracy (Dani Harmer) when she has her appendix out.
Philip	4 December 2003	Angus Alexander Brown	Philip and Cathy are the potential foster parents for Dolly (Chloe Hibbert-Waters). When Philip, Cathy and daughter Sophie, arrive at The Dumping Ground, flour and ketchup bombs are dropped on them by Dolly, Hayley (Kristal Lau) and Marco (Jack Edwards), who have formed "The Beaker Club". Dolly is fostered by Philip and Cathy.
Cathy	4 December 2003	June Campbell-Davies	Philip and Cathy are the potential foster parents for Dolly (Chloe Hibbert-Waters). When Philip, Cathy and daughter Sophie, arrive at The Dumping Ground, flour and ketchup bombs are dropped on them by Dolly, Hayley (Kristal Lau) and Marco (Jack Edwards), who have formed "The Beaker Club". Dolly is fostered by Philip and Cathy.
Sophie	4 December 2003	Rebecca Walker	Philip and Cathy are the potential foster parents for Dolly (Chloe Hibbert-Waters). When Philip, Cathy and daughter Sophie, arrive at The Dumping Ground, flour and ketchup bombs are dropped on them by Dolly, Hayley (Kristal Lau) and Marco (Jack Edwards), who have formed "The Beaker Club". Dolly is fostered by Philip and Cathy.
Maureen	18 April 2003 – 5 February 2004	Lynn Hunter	Maureen works at the bakery, where Bouncer (Ben Hanson) works. After a rough start in his job, Bouncer wins Maureen and Dave (Mark Flanagan) round by impressing them with homemade mayonnaise.
Dave	18 April 2003	Mark Flanagan	Dave works at the bakery, where Bouncer (Ben Hanson) works. Dave gives Bouncer a hard time and nicknames him "Orphanage Boy". After a rough start in his job, Bouncer wins Dave and Maureen (Lynn Hunter) round by impressing them with homemade mayonnaise.
Zara	18 April 2003	Jude Mitson	Zara is Cam's (Lisa Coleman) publicist, whom Tracy (Dani Harmer) clashes with.
Wilson	8 January 2003 – 15 January 2003	Oliver Llewellyn Jenkins	Wilson arrives at The Dumping Ground when his mother is rushed to hospital. Tracy (Dani Harmer) mistakes Wilson for Louise's (Chelsie Padley) boyfriend, so Tracy throws eggs at him and locks him in a cupboard. Crash (Darragh Mortell) loses a competition against Michael (William Tomlin), so he has to share a room with Wilson. Crash is impressed with Wilson when Wilson shows Crash all the goodies he has with him. Hayley (Kristal Lau) and Layla (Cara Readle) do Wilson's hair, but they get bubble gum stuck in his hair. When Tracy and Wilson talk, Justine (Montanna Thompson) teases Tracy about having a crush, but Tracy denies it. Lol (Ciaran Joyce) and Crash plant Duke's (Clive Rowe) mobile in Tracy's bag after sending love messages on both Duke and Shelley's (Nicola Reynolds) phone to each other's. When Duke's phone is found in Tracy's bag, Wilson takes the blame. When Tracy finds out that Wilson didn't do it, Wilson admits he likes Tracy to her and the pair kiss, which is witnessed by Justine.
Adam	8 January 2003	Richard Pask	Adam is the boyfriend of Louise (Chelsie Padley), who plays practical jokes on Louise. When new boy Wilson (Oliver Llewellyn Jenkins) arrives at The Dumping Ground, Tracy (Dani Harmer) mistakes him for Adam and throws egg, water and flour at him before locking him in a cupboard. When Tracy realises Wilson is not Adam, she lets him out.
Logan	29 January 2004	Paul Mohan	Logan is a football team coach, who Tracy (Dani Harmer) and Lol (Ciaran Joyce) visit to get Lol on the football team. Logan allows Lol to play with the team, but afterward, he says that Lol is too young. Logan arranges for Lol to be the team mascot.
Kelly	5 February 2004	Sophie Sherrington	Kelly is Bouncer's (Ben Hanson) girlfriend, who works with him at the bakery. When Kelly asks Bouncer if she could go back to his place and meet his family, Bouncer makes up excuses, which make Kelly think Bouncer is ashamed. Tracy (Dani Harmer) and Lol) (Ciaran Joyce) tease Bouncer about having a girlfriend as they followed him, but Bouncer said he lied to Kelly about having a family. Tracy and Lol intervene and invite Kelly around to The Dumping Ground and everyone helps getting the place ready. When Kelly arrives, Bouncer admits that it is a children's home, but Kelly reassures him that it is nothing to be ashamed of.
Sufia	19 February 2004	Krupa Patel	Sufia is a girl who arrives at The Dumping Ground in the middle of the night and Tracy (Dani Harmer) isn't pleased at sharing a room with her. When Shelley (Nicola Reynolds) runs an art competition to replace the broken photo, Tracy's is ruined by Michael (William Tomlin) and Sufia paints her a replacement. Tracy wins the competition, but gives her prize to Sufia as an apology for not telling everyone she did the painting.
Charlie Kean	4 March 2004	Dan Winter	Charlie Kean and his TV crew arrive at The Dumping Ground to film Cam's (Lisa Coleman) book launch. He gets annoyed with Tracy (Dani Harmer) when she keeps interrupting filming. When Jackie (Abby Rakic-Platt) fails to get a photo of Charlie and Charlie is rude towards her, Lol (Ciaran Joyce) and Bouncer (Ben Hanson) throw cold spaghetti on him from upstairs and Jackie photographs him.
Tom	11 March 2004 – 1 April 2004	Matt Zarb	Tom and Jake bump into Tracy (Dani Harmer) and Elaine (Nisha Nayer) at the science museum when Tracy is meeting prospective foster parents. When Tom and Jake return Tracy's jacket, they invite her to the park and Tracy gets advice on brothers and dads. Tracy knocks out Jake's filling and Tracy takes Jake's hat so she will see them again. When they come to collect the hat, Elaine convinces Tom and Jake to stay for a bit and they ask Tracy if she wants to come to the circus with them. Tom and Jake are invited to the BBQ and when Tracy spots Tom kissing Elaine, Tracy says he has to choose between Elaine or fostering her, but Tom tells her he has no intentions of fostering.
Jake	11 March 2004 – 1 April 2004	Ryan Nelson	
Ron	11 March 2004	Morgan Hopkins	Ron and Gwen and Dave and Jemima are two sets of potential foster parents who Tracy (Dani Harmer) meets at the science museum with Elaine (Nisha Nayer). Tracy gets annoyed with Eave and Jemima they repeatedly call her "Trace".
Gwen	11 March 2004	Sara McGaughey	Ron and Gwen and Dave and Jemima are two sets of potential foster parents who Tracy (Dani Harmer) meets at the science museum with Elaine (Nisha Nayer). Tracy gets annoyed with Eave and Jemima they repeatedly call her "Trace".
Dave	11 March 2004	Gareth Wyn Griffiths	Ron and Gwen and Dave and Jemima are two sets of potential foster parents who Tracy (Dani Harmer) meets at the science museum with Elaine (Nisha Nayer). Tracy gets annoyed with Eave and Jemima they repeatedly call her "Trace".
Jemima	11 March 2004	Debra Glazer	Ron and Gwen and Dave and Jemima are two sets of potential foster parents who Tracy (Dani Harmer) meets at the science museum with Elaine (Nisha Nayer). Tracy gets annoyed with Eave and Jemima they repeatedly call her "Trace".
Steward	25 March 2004	Dafydd Wyn-Roberts	A steward who initially doesn't allow Jackie (Abby Rakic-Platt) to participate in the race due to her late application, but Michael (William Tomlin) gets him to change his mind.

Series 4 (2004–2005)
Character	Date(s)	Actor	Circumstances
Amy	21 October 2004	Seren Morgan	Amy and Sue meet Tracy (Dani Harmer) and Cam (Lisa Coleman) at an art centre open day.
Sue	21 October 2004	Sarah Cartwright	Amy and Sue meet Tracy (Dani Harmer) and Cam (Lisa Coleman) at an art centre open day.
Penelope Lawson	28 October 2004	Marilyn Le Conte	Penelope is the mother of Cam (Lisa Coleman). When Cam tells Elaine (Nisha Nayer) that Tracy (Dani Harmer) spends a lot of time at The Dumping Ground, Elaine suggests that Tracy prefers being around a lot of people and that Cam should invite her mother. Tracy isn't pleased with the news, but Penelope wins Tracy round with presents. When Penelope starts interfering with how Cam and Tracy do things, Tracy tells them that she wants to play a video game and order in pizza, but Tracy gets annoyed when Penelope and Cam play the video game together and she feels pushed out.
Kez	4 November 2004	Jane Murphy	Kez is a trainee social worker, who tries to copy Elaine (Nisha Nayer). Tracy (Dani Harmer) helps Kez out with fostering theories.
Maureen	4 November 2004	Rebecca Orchard	When Tracy (Dani Harmer) does Cam's food shop with Crash, Tracy lies to Maureen that Cam steals her allowance. Maureen feels sorry for Tracy, so she gives her a bag of sweets.
Jane	15 December 2004	Evelyn Duah	Jane is a trainee careworker, who Bouncer (Ben Hanson) is attracted to. Chantal (Deepal Parmar), Rio (Craig Roberts) and Roxy (Sophie Borja-Edwards) intercept Bouncer's love letters to Jane and write back to Bouncer as Jane, asking for gifts.
Frances	15 December 2004	Katy Owen	Frances is a trainee careworker, whom Lol (Ciaran Joyce) is attracted to.
Mr Boxer	4 January 2005 – 8 December 2005	Dave Bond	Mr and Mrs Boxer are potential foster parents for Marco (Jack Edwards). However, after failing with a potential foster family earlier that day, the residents change his appearance and personality. When it turns out that Mr and Mrs Boxer are eccentric, the kids plan to show Mr and Mrs Boxer how Marco really is. On Special Guest's day, Mr and Mrs Boxer have been approved to foster Marco, but Marco is sad about leaving Milly (Holly Gibbs) and Marco persuades Mr and Mrs Boxer to foster Milly as well.
Mrs Boxer	4 January 2005 – 8 December 2005	Anita Reynolds	
Mr Pincher	11 January 2005	Keiron Self	Mr Pincher is an inspector who inspects The Dumping Ground. Chantal (Deepal Parmar), Rio (Craig Roberts) and Roxy (Sophie Borja-Edwards) devise a plan to get The Dumping Ground shut down by pretending that Sid (Vincenzo Pellegrino) and Duke (Clive Rowe) mistreat them.
Journalist	18 January 2005	Rhian Green	A journalist from "Kids in Care" magazine, who speaks to Tracy (Dani Harmer), Justine (Montanna Thompson) and Duke about Elaine (Nisha Nayer).
Dignitary	18 January 2005	Lloyd Johnston	Elaine (Nisha Nayer) speaks to the Dignitary, mistaking him for the journalist (Rhian Green). He soon gets fed up of Elaine and says that he simply came to the reception to sample to cakes.
"Flying" Freddie Mercer	25 January 2005 – 8 December 2005	Ram John Holder	Freddie is an old running friend of Jack (Howell Evans), who Arthur (Charles Lewsen) picks up on the way to Jack's funeral. Arthur, Freddie and George (Noel Williams) convince Jackie (Abby Rakic-Platt) to go to Jack's funeral. When Jackie returns home from Brownhurst Academy with an injury, she is unimpressed with Freddie's presence and Jackie later admits to Freddie, Tracy (Dani Harmer) and Crash (Darragh Mortell) that she faked the injury as she was homesick. Freddie visits Jackie on Special Guests day and Freddie's hair is covered in green paint by Roxy's (Sophie Borja-Edwards) friend, Romily (Ruth Collett).
Nurse Nadia	25 January 2005	Tara Breathnach	The nurse who cares for Jackie's (Abby Rakic-Platt) grandfather, Jack (Howell Evans).
Arthur MacDonald	25 January 2005	Charles Lewsen	Arthur and George are old running friends of Jack (Howell Evans), who the residents track down for Jack's funeral. Arthur, Freddie and George convince Jackie (Abby Rakic-Platt) to go to Jack's funeral.
George Divine	25 January 2005	Noel Williams	Arthur and George are old running friends of Jack (Howell Evans), who the residents track down for Jack's funeral. Arthur, Freddie and George convince Jackie (Abby Rakic-Platt) to go to Jack's funeral.
Minister	25 January 2005	Mike Haywood	The minister who performs Jack's (Howell Evans) funeral.
Mr Smart	8 February 2005	Richard Elfyn	Elaine (Nisha Nayer) recommends Duke (Clive Rowe) for a job with Mr Smart. When Mr Smart goes to The Dumping Ground to collect a written reference from Duke, Duke decides not to go for a job with Mr Smart and stays at The Dumping Ground.
Constance Carlton	22 February 2005	Christine Winter	Constance arrives at The Dumping Ground to relieve Sid (Vincenzo Pellegrino) of some of his troubles. Constance doesn't allow Tracy (Dani Harmer) to visit, even with permission from Sid. The residents aren't happy when Constance shows them their new care plans or with Mathelympics. In attempt to get rid of Constance. Bouncer (Ben Hanson) and Lol (Ciaran Joyce) set a trap in the kitchen, but it doesn't work. Tracy and Crash get help from Christopher "Crusher" (George Heritage) and Sian (Jodie Lunnon) to get rid of Constance.
Christopher "Crusher"	22 February 2005	George Heritage	Tracy (Dani Harmer) and Crash (Darragh Mortell) get Crusher and Sian's help to get rid of Constance (Christine Winter).
Sian	22 February 2005	Jodie Lunnon	Tracy (Dani Harmer) and Crash (Darragh Mortell) get Crusher and Sian's help to get rid of Constance (Christine Winter).
Dora	1 March 2005	Faith Kent	After Tracy (Dani Harmer) flashes some cash from her foster grandmother, Penelope Lawson (Marilyn Le Conte), the residents invite Dora and Henry, hoping they will get some money. Dora and Henry soon become aware of the plan and decide to play along.
Henry	1 March 2005	1 March 2005	After Tracy (Dani Harmer) flashes some cash from her foster grandmother, Penelope Lawson (Marilyn Le Conte), the residents invite Dora and Henry, hoping they will get some money. Dora and Henry soon become aware of the plan and decide to play along.
Social Worker	15 March 2005	Amy Starling	The social worker who shows Bouncer's (Ben Hanson) his room on his visit to the halfway house.
Ron	5 April 2005	Julian Lewis Jones	On the residents orienteering trip, Ron, Sid (Vincenzo Pellegrino) and Duke (Clive Rowe) play some practical jokes on the kids. The jokes include gunge falling on them and putting their hands in different food stuffs. The kids soon get their own back by hosing Ron, Sid and Duke with water.

Series 5 (2005)
Character	Date(s)	Actor	Circumstances
John	28 November 2005 – 8 December 2005	Adam Skilton	John is Justine's (Montanna Thompson) cousin. Justine isn't unhappy with his arrival and when Justine learns that she has to give up her room for John, Justine decides to go back to The Dumping Ground. On Special Guest's day, Justine isn't thrilled when her dad brings John along. When John has an allergic reaction to nuts, Justine gives John his injection and John apologises to Justine.
Billy	28 November 2005	Morgan Wyn Bowen	Billy is Justine's (Montanna Thompson) half-brother and the son of Steve (Morgan Hopkins) and Carrie (Kathryn Dimery).
Chantal's dad	29 November 2005	Vinod Soni	The father of Chantal (Deepal Parmar), whom Chantal goes to live with in Somerset.
Gary Eyette	29 November-9 December 2005	George McAllister	When Tracy (Dani Harmer) is on holiday with Cam (Lisa Coleman), Cam meets Gary. Unhappy with Cam's new relationship, Tracy moves back to The Dumping Ground. When Cam invites Tracy to come on a picnic, Tracy declines, however she later changes her mind after a conversation with Mike (Connor Byrne). Things go well on the picnic, to everyone's surprise and she later goes out for dinner with Gary and Cam. Gary and Cam break the news to Tracy they are getting married and Tracy doesn't take it well. On the day of the wedding, Cam can't bear the thought of Tracy not being at the wedding and she tells Gary that everyone has tried. Gary gets Crash (Darragh Mortell) to get Tracy to the park so he can try to find out what the problem is, but Tracy is angry at Gary for using Crash to get to her. Tracy later admits her fears to Crash and Jackie, which is that she thinks that Cam and Gary will want children of their own and not her, but Crash and Jackie reassure her. Tracy attends the wedding and she tells Gary and Cam that she wants them to get married. At the wedding reception, Gary and Cam tell Tracy that they don't want to foster her, but they want to adopt her instead.
Mrs Ball	29 November 2005	Victoria Pugh	Mrs Ball and her husband attend the open day at The Dumping Ground arranged by Elaine (Nisha Nayer). Rio (Craig Roberts) introduces himself to Mrs Ball and her husband after changing his appearance to try to get fostered. Roxy (Sophie Borja-Edwards) offers Mrs Ball and her husband a biscuit, but Rio tries to take them off her as they have salt in.
Shop Assistant	1 December 2005	Phylip Harries	When Marco (Jack Edwards) wants a mum so he can get an alien from a store doing a mother's day special, Bouncer (Ben Hanson) pretends to be his mum. The shop assistant is attracted to Bouncer's female persona, but the shop assistant think Bouncer is winding him up when he discovers Bouncer is not a woman. Marco admits that he is in care and he allows Marco, Lol (Ciaran Joyce) and Wolfie (Felix Drake) to have an alien.
Mrs Lucre	5 December 2005	Emma Treharne Jones	Mrs and Me Lucre are potential foster parents. After overhearing what facilities Mrs and Mr Lucre have, everyone lines up and politely greet Mrs and Mr Lucre. Mrs and Mr Lucre decide to foster Tracy the dog.
Mr Lucre	5 December 2005	Giles Thomas	Mrs and Me Lucre are potential foster parents. After overhearing what facilities Mrs and Mr Lucre have, everyone lines up and politely greet Mrs and Mr Lucre. Mrs and Mr Lucre decide to foster Tracy the dog.
Theo	6 December 2005	Patrick Robinson	Theo is Crash's (Darragh Mortell) father. Crash is unsure about seeing him, but as Theo is about to leave, Crash wants him to stay. Theo and Crash bond over football, but Jackie (Abby Rakic-Platt) and Justine (Montanna Thompson) confiscate the ball in order to get them to actually talk. When Theo starts getting ideas about his and Crash's future, Crash snaps at Theo and tells him to go. Jackie gets Theo back and Theo and Crash make up.
Lucy	6 December 2005	Lisa Diveney	Lucy, Mr Willis and Mrs Hood are candidates for the head careworker job. The young people challenge Mr Willis to make costume hats for Marco (Jack Edwards) and Milly (Holly Gibbs). Marco and Milly aren't satisfied with his effort. The young people don't like Mrs Hood's cleverness. The young people think Lucy is perfect, however Alice (Olivia Grant) doesn't like Lucy and Roxy (Sophie Borja-Edwards) agrees with Alice and makes up a story that Lucy use to work at her old care home.
Mr Willis	6 December 2005	Owen Garmon	Lucy, Mr Willis and Mrs Hood are candidates for the head careworker job. The young people challenge Mr Willis to make costume hats for Marco (Jack Edwards) and Milly (Holly Gibbs). Marco and Milly aren't satisfied with his effort. The young people don't like Mrs Hood's cleverness. The young people think Lucy is perfect, however Alice (Olivia Grant) doesn't like Lucy and Roxy (Sophie Borja-Edwards) agrees with Alice and makes up a story that Lucy use to work at her old care home.
Mrs Hood	6 December 2005	Owen Garmon	Lucy, Mr Willis and Mrs Hood are candidates for the head careworker job. The young people challenge Mr Willis to make costume hats for Marco (Jack Edwards) and Milly (Holly Gibbs). Marco and Milly aren't satisfied with his effort. The young people don't like Mrs Hood's cleverness. The young people think Lucy is perfect, however Alice (Olivia Grant) doesn't like Lucy and Roxy (Sophie Borja-Edwards) agrees with Alice and makes up a story that Lucy use to work at her old care home.
Charlie	8 December 2005	Sid Beadle	In Mike (Connor Byrne) and Elaine's (Nisha Nayer) absence, Charlie is abandoned at The Dumping Ground. Justine (Montanna Thompson) looks after Charlie, teaching him life lessons on the way. When Mike and Elaine return, a foster family is arranged to collect Charlie.
Emily	8 December 2005	Natasha Collett	Emily and Romily are friends of Roxy's (Sophie Borja-Edwards), except the young people only know of Emily. When Bouncer's (Ben Hanson) brownie mix is tampered with and Eddie's hair goes green, Emily is the prime suspect as she was seen covered in green paint, but Roxy and Alice (Olivia Grant) were with Emily. It emerges that Emily is a twin and Romily was responsible for green paint incidents.
Romily	8 December 2005	Ruth Collett	Emily and Romily are friends of Roxy's (Sophie Borja-Edwards), except the young people only know of Emily. When Bouncer's (Ben Hanson) brownie mix is tampered with and Eddie's hair goes green, Emily is the prime suspect as she was seen covered in green paint, but Roxy and Alice (Olivia Grant) were with Emily. It emerges that Emily is a twin and Romily was responsible for green paint incidents.
New Girl	9 December 2005	Maddie Rakic-Platt	A new girl who arrives at The Dumping Ground.
Registrar	9 December 2005	Sian Naiomi	The registrar who performs Cam (Lisa Coleman) and Gary's (George McAllister) wedding.

== See also ==
- List of The Story of Tracy Beaker (franchise) characters
- List of Tracy Beaker Returns characters
- List of The Dumping Ground characters
