= Murder (2002 TV series) =

- Om Puri and Julie Walters as Akash Gupta and Angela Maurer
- Genre: Crime drama
- Written by: Abi Morgan
- Directed by: Beeban Kidron
- Starring: Julie Walters; Roland Manookian; Nicola Reynolds; Paul Higgins; Jason Done; Robert Glenister; David Morrissey; Imelda Staunton; Aaron McCusker
- Composer: Nina Humphreys
- Country of origin: United Kingdom
- Original language: English
- No. of series: 1
- No. of episodes: 4

Production
- Executive producer: Greg Brenman
- Producer: Rebecca De Souza
- Cinematography: Ian Wilson
- Editor: Paul Tothill
- Running time: 50 minutes
- Production company: Tiger Aspect Productions

Original release
- Network: BBC Two
- Release: 29 May – 19 June 2002

Murder is a British television crime drama series, first broadcast between 29 May and 19 June 2002, that ran for a total of four episodes on BBC Two. The series starred Julie Walters as Angela Maurer, a mother who seeks help from a local journalist after her son, Christopher, is killed the day after his 21st birthday. Each episode focuses on a different character who is somehow linked to the story through Angela, including the journalist, a shopkeeper, a police detective and a witness to the crime itself. The serial was written by playwright Abi Morgan, and directed by Beeban Kidron.

Producer Rebecca de Souza said of the series: "Unless we've had a personal experience of murder we think we understand it because we've all seen investigations on TV or read about them in the newspapers. They are generally presented in a particular way. The focus tends to be on the victim and the police investigation. We wanted to explore the idea that, alongside the immediate family, many people are affected by murder – some in surprising ways." Writer Abi Morgan said of her inspirations for the series. "Their stories were so incredible, there was a strong sense that they had been touched by madness. I wanted to capture the intensity of what they were living through as well as the odd normality of it. Their experiences had a surreal sense about them, but at the same time they had to carry on with their lives. What keeps Angela going is her drive to find out who did it, but, once the investigation is over, there really is nowhere else to go. You just have to live with it."

Walters was awarded a BAFTA television award in 2003 for Best Actress for her role as Angela Maurer. The series averaged around 3 million viewers, with the first episode notably beating ER in the ratings. Notably, the series has never been released on VHS or DVD.

== Cast ==
- Julie Walters as Angela Maurer
- Roland Manookian as Ryan McGuinness
- Nicola Reynolds as Roz Finch
- Paul Higgins as Lee Finch
- Jason Done as Christopher Maurer
- Robert Glenister as Robert Weldon
- David Morrissey as Dave Dewston
- Imelda Staunton as DCI Billie Dory
- Aaron McCusker as DS T.J. Holland
- Elizabeth Rider as DS Wentworth
- Om Puri as Akash Gupta
- Ron Cook as Gareth McGuinness

== Episodes ==
No.	Title	Directed by	Written by	British air date	UK viewers (million)
1	"The Journalist"	Beeban Kidron	Abi Morgan	29 May 2002	3.85
When a young man is brutally murdered on his way to work, the day after his 21st birthday, his adoring mother's life is shattered. A self-interested journalist who only cares about getting a front-page story tries to take advantage of the situation.
2	"The Newsagent"	Beeban Kidron	Abi Morgan	5 June 2002	2.88
Angela expresses her complete dissatisfaction with the way the police are handling the case, and turns to her local newsagent for help.
3	"The Detective"	Beeban Kidron	Abi Morgan	12 June 2002	2.92
Detective Billie Dory is challenged by an angry Angela over the lack of progress in the case. Meanwhile, officers arrest Chris' friend Ryan McGuinness, after they learn Chris may have spent the night with Ryan's girlfriend. However, they soon discover Chris also had a testy relationship with his brother-in-law.
4	"The Witness"	Beeban Kidron	Abi Morgan	19 June 2002	2.37
Good Samaritan Robert, who found Chris bloodied and beaten on the sidewalk, agrees to participate in a reconstruction. But soon, the pressure of the situation threatens to traumatise him. But will it help solve the crime?
