= The Story of Tracy Beaker series 2 =

The Story of Tracy Beaker
- Season 2
- Series Two Title Card
- Starring: Dani Harmer; Lisa Coleman; Montanna Thompson; Nisha Nayar; Clive Rowe; Chelsie Padley; Sharlene Whyte; Rochelle Gadd; Luke Youngblood; Ben Hanson; Ciaran Joyce; Chloe Hibbert-Waters; James Cartwright; Alicia Hooper
- No. of episodes: 26

Release
- Original network: CBBC; CBBC HD (repeats)
- Original release: 7 January – 3 April 2003

Series chronology
- ← Previous; Series 1 Next → Series 3

The second series of the British children's television series The Story of Tracy Beaker began broadcasting on 7 January 2003 on CBBC and ended on 3 April 2003. The series follows the lives of the children living in the fictional children's care home of Stowey House, nicknamed by them "The Dumping Ground". It consists of twenty-six, fifteen-minute episodes. It is the second series in The Story of Tracy Beaker franchise.

== Cast ==
Dani Harmer (Tracy Beaker), Montanna Thompson (Justine Littlewood), Chelsie Padley (Louise Govern), Rochelle Gadd (Adele Azupadi), Nisha Nayar (Elaine Boyak), Clive Rowe (Duke), Sharlene Whyte (Jenny Edwards), Luke Youngblood (Ben Batambuze) and Lisa Coleman (Cam Lawson) all returned to their main roles and Stephen Crossley returned to his guest starring role as Justine's father, Steve Littlewood. Sonny Muslim (Ryan Matthews), Jay Haher (Zac Matthews), Joe Starrs (Peter Ingham), Jerome Holder (Maxy) and Connor Byrne (Mike Milligan) did not return for the second series, but Byrne reprised his role in the final series. Ciaran Joyce, Ben Hanson, Chloe Hibbert-Waters, Alicia Hooper and James Cartwright all made their debuts as main characters, Lol Plakova, Bouncer Plakova, Dolly, Amber Hearst and Nathan Jones respectively. This was the last series to feature Gadd, Whyte, Youngblood and Hooper and the last series to feature Padley as a main cast member.

=== Main ===
- Dani Harmer as Tracy Beaker
- Lisa Coleman as Cam Lawson
- Montanna Thompson as Justine Littlewood
- Nisha Nayar as Elaine Boyak
- Clive Rowe as Duke Ellington
- Chelsie Padley as Louise Govern
- Sharlene Whyte as Jenny Edwards
- Rochelle Gadd as Adele Azupadi
- Luke Youngblood as Ben Batambuze
- Ben Hanson as Bouncer Plakova
- Ciaran Joyce as Lol Plakova
- Chloe Hibbert-Waters as Dolly
- James Cartwright as Nathan Jones
- Alicia Hooper as Amber Hearst

=== Guest ===
- Gerri Smith as Nathan's Lecturer
- Stephen Crossley as Steve Littlewood
- Caroline Bunce as Carrie
- Gurmail Garib Singh as Vikram Singh
- Declan Wilson as Jasper
- Emily Carter, Lowri Jenkins and Nadine Marie Egal as Gang Girls
- Charlotte Lowri as Anna
- Leighton Morgan as Warren
- Sule Rimi as Mr Byron
- Portia Nicholson as Receptionist
- Duncan Betts as Celebrant
- Calum Fowler and Natasha Mitchell as Quiz Kids
- Jonathan Davies as Derrick
- Kevin McCurdy as Ben's Dad
- Mohammed Hadan as Jamie
- Rhys Parry Jones as Mr Morris
- Kerry Joy Stewart as Mrs Morris
- Tony Leader as Granddad Morris
- Emily Carter and James Marshall as Gang
- Roderick Smith as Gordon
- Tracy Williams as Kate
- Brendan Charleson as Colin
- Claire Cage as Selima

== Episodes ==
No. in series	Title	Directed by	Written by	Original release date	Prod. code
1	"Back & Bad"	Delyth Thomas	Mary Morris	7 January 2003	2.1
Tracy comes back to the Dumping Ground with a big bang after setting fire to Cam's kitchen. She swears never to see or talk to her again. Meanwhile, a new trainee careworker called Nathan arrives and he proves more than a match for the kids when they play pranks on him. Note: First appearance of Lol Plakova (Ciaran Joyce), Bouncer Plakova (Ben Hanson), Dolly (Chloe Hibbert-Waters), Nathan Jones (James Cartwright).
2	"Bedsit"	Joss Agnew	Laura Summers	9 January 2003	2.2
Tracy is bored of being fussed over by everyone after her return to the DG, so when she finds Adele's new bedsit address she decides go and visit her. Tracy decides to turn the garden shed into her bedsit. But the others also turn various rooms of the house into their bedsit, and Dolly causes chaos when she locks herself in the bathroom. Note: Return of Adele Azupadi (Rochelle Gadd)
3	"Brothers"	Joss Agnew	Ian Carney	14 January 2003	2.3
Lol, Bouncer and Ben buy a lot of unhealthy food from Nathan's website and create a shop in the cellar called "The Sugar Shack". But Lol soon becomes a rival to Tracy. Meanwhile, Nathan is working on a food project and as well as providing nothing but healthy salads at mealtimes, he bans Dolly from a certain orange drink, making her intent on revenge.
4	"Action Therapy"	Delyth Thomas	Gary Parker	16 January 2003	2.4
Tracy has still not been in contact with Cam after coming back to the DG so Elaine resolves to get them talking with a series of role-play and trust exercises, and persuades the other kids to use this method with each other, causing chaos. But takes away the kids freedom on Saturdays.
5	"Alien"	Joss Agnew	Rob Gittins	21 January 2003	2.5
A spooky sensation has taken over the DG, with Lol making horror films and strange noises in the middle of the night. Finally, the mystery is revealed – a new bad girl has arrived called Amber. Meanwhile Lol has to make a film for his homework, and chooses to make a scary movie. Note: First appearance of Amber Hearst (Alicia Hooper).
6	"Doggie"	Delyth Thomas	Tracy Brabin	23 January 2003	2.6
A stray dog is roaming the corridors of the DG and Dolly gets upset as he reminds her of a foster family's pet. Seeing Dolly sad, Tracy tries to help by offering to foster 'Fang' and they pursue him until he's safely locked up in Tracy's bedroom. Meanwhile Justine gets the impression that Lol has a crush on her, but it leads to an embarrassing turn out...
7	"Bad Girls"	Delyth Thomas	Othniel Smith	28 January 2003	2.7
Tracy sees Amber's bad girl gang and immediately wants to become a member, while Bouncer and Lol decide to spy on Amber and her "gang" after they steal their football. Meanwhile, Louise is tired of being a goody-goody and has a fashion and personality makeover, inspired once again by Amber's presence.
8	"Big Fight"	Delyth Thomas	Andy Walker	30 January 2003	2.8
Tracy and Justine have an argument over the TV remote control and, forbidden to fight by Elaine, set up Champions to wrestle on their behalf. But the two boys in question, Bouncer and Ben, are not so keen.
9	"Hollywood"	Joss Agnew	Sam Bain & Jesse Armstrong	4 February 2003	2.9
Tracy makes a video of her life to get fostered by a Hollywood star, so Dolly decides to do the same, which causes all the other kids to do the same when Dolly gets a reply back from a Hollywood couple. But Lol causes trouble when he plans to make a film about the cruelty that kids suffer in care, enlisting the help of Elaine and Duke.
10	"Home Truths"	Delyth Thomas	Mary Morris	6 February 2003	2.10
When Dolly makes Nathan play a game of Truth and Dare with her, Duke is worried about the consequences and rightly so! When Tracy gets accused of constantly lying, she promises to tell the whole truth until six o'clock, and everyone's best kept secrets are revealed. Meanwhile, Nathan has a new girlfriend but he finds himself choosing between her and Dolly.
11	"Day Trip"	Joss Agnew	Gary Parker	11 February 2003	2.11
Jenny has arranged a trip out for the kids at an Adventure Centre and looks forward to a day of peace and tranquillity at the DG whilst Duke and Nathan accompany the kids into the countryside. When they arrive, they are introduced by Gordon who ends up irritating all the kids and they all try to get their own back. Meanwhile, Jenny is enjoying her dad of peace home alone, but Elaine turns up so they can go through paper work whilst no one else was in the house to interrupt. Note: Amber is absent in this episode
12	"Christmas"	Delyth Thomas	Laura Summers	13 February 2003	2.12
Bouncer and Lol's aunt is considering taking them on full-time and Lol is excited to be leaving the DG for a life free of rules and regulations. But Bouncer has the opposite reaction – he's quite at home at the DG and bad Christmas memories make him yearn to stay, so Tracy decides to bring Christmas early to the DG.
13	"Takeover"	Delyth Thomas	Sam Bain & Jesse Armstrong	18 February 2003	2.13
A mystery takes over the DG when chairs are being re-arranged, shoelaces tied together and other spooky phenomena, and Lol and Bouncer have their own theory on the strange events. Meanwhile Louise gets a gigantic chocolate bar from her auntie, but it later goes missing and everyone assumes Tracy took it when she went to "look after" Cam who's sick.
14	"Work"	Joss Agnew	Lucy Flannery	20 February 2003	2.14
Bouncer and Amber are doing badly at school, so Elaine takes charge of their next project – setting up work placements. Her options are extremely dull so Bouncer is inspired to get his own job – as a paperboy. But a jealous Tracy soon finds a way to make some easy money and in the process, get one over on Amber.
15	"Bridesmaid"	Joss Agnew	Mary Morris	25 February 2003	2.15
Justine's Dad is marrying his girlfriend Carrie and Justine is to be a bridesmaid. But her Dad's unfortunate choice of dress leaves her so miserable that Tracy and the girls try to help. But a food fight soon ruins the dress - and jeopardises Justine's part in the wedding. Meanwhile, Lol and Bouncer are irritated that the DG is being dominated by girls and that the girls are being sexist towards them and decide to take action.
16	"Quiz"	Delyth Thomas	Rob Gittins & Gary Parker	27 February 2003	2.16
Nathan is inspired after winning a quiz and enters the DG into a Care Home Quiz Competition. But his suggestion coincides with a rather nasty washing incident, which leaves all the kids clothes dyed an unfortunate shade of green proving he's pretty incapable in his job. As the day of the competition arrives, the fighting DG kids must work together to win.
17	"Two-Timing Adele"	Delyth Thomas	Abigail Abben Mensah	4 March 2003	2.17
Adele's mobile is being repaired and soon everyone at the Dumping Ground is tired of taking messages from all her boyfriends. But they soon realise that each boy offers a different range of goodies for them all – and set about getting their guy instated as Adele's ultimate beau. But it's not long before a battle between the two gangs of kids commences.
18	"Secrets and Lies"	Joss Agnew	Othniel Smith	6 March 2003	2.18
Fearing that he and his brother will be put into different homes, Lol 'bugs' a big staff meeting. But he's tricked when Amber gets to the tape before he can, and alarmed when she begins to fuel rumour and suspicion about the subjects discussed by the staff - It's time for Tracy to take actions.
19	"Music"	Joss Agnew	Laura Summers	11 March 2003	2.19
Inspired by Adele joining a band and sick of sharing everything, Tracy decides she'll learn to play a musical instrument and Duke gets her a saxophone via Elaine. But soon, the whole DG is turned into musical chaos as the other kids force Elaine into buying them instruments. Meanwhile, Amber moves into Tracy's bedroom when she graffiti's her bedroom wall, adding to the chaos created by Elaine.
20	"Family Tree"	Delyth Thomas	Andy Walker	13 March 2003	2.20
A school project has Tracy, Justine and Louise working on their family trees which brings out some intense feelings. Later, when Louise is about to meet a potential new foster family, she is worried at the thought of losing not only her best friend Justine but everything she knows and loves about the DG, so Tracy accompanies her on the trip. Meanwhile, Bouncer and Lol befriend the Morris's grandad and the three cause havoc at the DG.
21	"Ben's Party"	Joss Agnew	Laura Summers	18 March 2003	2.21
Amber accuses Ben of being wimpy and boring so he decides to throw a huge party while his parents are out and invites all the DG kids along. But Tracy doesn't get an invite after they have an argument: a decision Ben comes to regret when Amber's friends gatecrash the party.
22	"Get Lost"	Joss Agnew	Mary Morris	20 March 2003	2.22
When Tracy hears that Ben's Aunt and Uncle are visiting, she lands herself an invitation to his house – and the foursome take a trip to the beach. But Ben's aunt Kate, under the pretence Tracy is a spoilt rich girl, issues Tracy a few home truths. Meanwhile, It's Saturday at the DG and the rest of the kids are away, everyone except for Dolly, who manages to tire all three staff members by herself. Note: First appearance of Jasper Batambuze (Declan Wilson) & Kate Batambuze (Tracy Williams)
23	"The Long Goodbye"	Delyth Thomas	Othniel Smith	25 March 2003	2.23
It's Louise's last day at the DG, as she's going to be fostered by the Morris family. She tries to put a brave face on her worries about leaving the DG, her friends and especially Justine. Meanwhile, Lol holds an auction at the DG consisting of Louise's unwanted belongings. And, things look up for Amber as she finds a couple who share her enthusiasm for motorbikes and mayhem, who also happen to be old friends of Duke's.
24	"Genius at Work"	Delyth Thomas	Othniel Smith	27 March 2003	2.24
After a series of experimental art trials (including inscribing the letter 'D' all over Duke's face) Tracy is grounded and is instructed to try to cheer Justine up, who is depressed that Louise has left. Meanwhile, Ben is ill, and Lol and Bouncer use this as a perfect opportunity to play with his games.
25	"Nathan's Assessment"	Delyth Thomas	Laura Summers	1 April 2003	2.25
Elaine arrives at the DG to check that Nathan is coming up to scratch as a trainee. After interviewing all the kids and an angry Tracy (whom he has cancelled a bowling trip with) and discovering that he hasn't completed one piece of coursework, her report looks worrying – she has the power to fail him, so Tracy, the staff and the kids join forces to save his job.
26	"Home and Hosed"	Joss Agnew	Mary Morris	3 April 2003	2.26
Ben's Aunt and Uncle, Kate and Jasper, arrive at the DG – with the intentions of fostering Tracy. But it would mean leaving everything she knows behind - including Cam and Ben, and the DG kids also pose a threat to her new life. Note: Final appearance of Adele Azupadi (Rochelle Gadd), Jenny Edwards (Sharlene Whyte), Ben Batambuze (Luke Youngblood) Amber Hearst (Alicia Hooper), Jasper Batambuze (Declan Wilson)and Kate Batambuze (Tracy Williams).

== Production ==
Cas Lester was the executive producer and Jane Dauncey was the producer for this series. Filming took place in 2002, after the end of series 1 had aired. Susan Tully and David Skynner didn't return to direct series 2 and were replaced Delyth Thomas, who directed fourteen episodes, and Joss Agnew, who directed twelve episodes. Elly Brewer (who later returned as head writer), Arnold Evans, Carol Russell, Roger Griffiths and Graham Alborough didn't return to writing for series 2. Ian Carrey, Gary Parker, Rob Gittins, Tracy Brabin, Lucy Flannery, Abigal Abben Mensah and writing duo, Sam Bain & Jesse Armstrong replaced those who had left. Returning from series 1 is Mary Morris, Laura Summers, Othniel Smith and Andy Walker. Morris and Summers wrote five episodes each; Smith wrote four episodes; Walker, Parker and duo, Bain & Armstrong wrote two episodes; Carney, Gittins, Brabin, Flannery and Mensah all wrote one episode each. Parker and Gittins wrote an episode together as well.

== Awards and nominations ==
Ceremony	Award	Nominee	Result
2003 Children's BAFTA Awards	Children's Drama	The Story of Tracy Beaker	Nominated
2003 Children's BAFTA Awards	Children's Writer	Mary Morris	Nominated
