= Abby Rakic-Platt =

British actress (born 1993)

- Born: 3 May 1993 (age 33); London, England
- Occupation: Actress
- Years active: 2003–present

Abby Rakic-Platt (born 3 May 1993) is a British actress best known for her performances in the television series The Story of Tracy Beaker on the children's channel CBBC as Jackie Hopper. She appeared in a 2010 Sainsbury's Christmas advert.

== Early and personal life ==
She attended Highams Park School and Grey Coat Hospital secondary school, both in London, England, and has four younger siblings, Madeline "Maddie", Jaime and Eloise Rakic-Platt (born in 2001) who are also actresses. Rakic-Platt's maternal grandfather is from Yugoslavia. Rakic-Platt was trained at the Anna Scher Theatre School, attending from the age of 7 or 8 to 18. Rakic-Platt lives in Walthamstow with her father, a taxi driver, and her mother, a school secretary.

Her sister Madeline appeared in programmes such as the last episode of The Story of Tracy Beaker, and the eldest daughter of Peter Capaldi's character in Torchwood: Children of Earth; whilst her youngest sister Eloise appeared in the Doctor Who episode Forest of the Dead.

She is naturally brunette but dyed her hair red to play Jackie.

== Filmography ==
Year	Title	Role	Notes
2003	Murder In Mind	Holly Robbins	Justice
2003–2005	The Story of Tracy Beaker	Jackie Hopper	Series 3–5
2004	Tracy Beaker's Movie of Me	Jackie Hopper	TV film
2004	Tracy Beaker Parties With Pudsey	Jackie Hopper	
2006	The Bill	Keeley Tate	Episode #425
2006	The Inspector Lynley Mysteries	Nicky Warren	Episode: One Guilty Deed
2009	A Small Town Duet	Ruby	
2010	The Bill	Abi Cole	Episode: That Type of Cop
2013	Life of Crime	Ellen Carver	S1 E1
2013	Breathless	Alice	S1 E4
2014	Casualty	Libby Carson	Episode: Losing Grip
2015, 2017	Chewing Gum	Kristy Raven	7 Episodes

== Theatre ==
Year	Title	Role	Notes	Refs.
2012	Vera Vera Vera	Charlie	Royal Court Theatre, London	
