= Nicola Reynolds =

Welsh actress

- Born: Nicola Reynolds; 26 July 1972 (age 54); Pontypridd, Wales, UK
- Occupation: Actress
- Years active: 1995–present
- Notable credit(s): The Story of Tracy Beaker (2003–2005); Ideal (2005–2011)
- Children: 1

Nicola Jane Reynolds (born 26 July 1972) is a Welsh actress. She resides in Cardiff.

== Career ==
After having a small role in the 1999 film Human Traffic, Reynolds appeared in a series of jobbing roles, including Clocking Off and High Hopes. Reynolds also appeared as Meg in the BBC Wales series Scrum 4. She made her breakthrough in the CBBC show The Story of Tracy Beaker as head care worker Shelley Appleton. In 2002 she appeared alongside Julie Walters in the BBC series Murder. During this period, she also became part of an ensemble around comedian and actor Johnny Vegas. She starred alongside him in Sex Lives of the Potato Men and on BBC Three's Ideal. In recent years, she has returned to theatre in a number of touring productions.

== Personal life ==
Reynolds has a daughter named Matilda.

== Filmography ==
Year	Show	Role	Notes
1996, 1998	Coronation Street	WPC Tate (1996); Niece of an American Customer (1998)	2 roles
1999	Human Traffic	Nina	Film
1999	Lucky Bag	Unnamed	Unknown episodes
2000	Dirty Work	Midwife	Episode: "A Fish Called Rhondda"
2001	Clocking Off	PC Crane	Episode: "Ronnie's Story"
2002	Murder	Roz Finch	TV film
2002	High Hopes	Jennifer Brookes	Episode: "Heavens Above!"
2003	Ready When You Are, Mr. McGill	Gossiping Housewife 2	TV film
2003–2004, 2005	The Story of Tracy Beaker	Shelley Appleton	Series regular, 22 episodes (s. 3); Recurring role, 5 episodes (s. 5)
2004	Sex Lives of the Potato Men	Poppy	Film
2004	Tracy Beaker's Movie of Me	Shelley Appleton	TV film
2005–2011	Ideal	Nicki	Series regular, 48 episodes
2009	Framed	Bethan Hughes	TV film
2013, 2017	Stella	Shelley Evans	2 episodes
2013	The Machine	Joan	TV film
2013	Doctors	Dr. Robyn Pattison	2 episodes
2014	Benny & Jolene	Kathryn	Film
2017	Urban Myths	Landlady	Episode: "Hitler the Artist"
2018	Requiem	Natalie Franken	Episode: "The Necklace"
2019	The Accident	Judge	Episode #1.4
2022	The Tuckers	Lynne	Episode #3.3
2023	Y Sŵn	Lady Plowden	Film
