= Cara Readle =

Welsh actress

- Born: Cara Jayne Readle; 8 January 1991 (age 35); Swansea, Wales, United Kingdom
- Occupation: Actress
- Years active: 2003–present

Cara Readle (born 8 January 1991) is a British actress from Swansea, Wales, known mainly for her role as Layla in the BBC's The Story of Tracy Beaker from series three to five.

== Early life and career ==
Cara Jayne was born in Swansea to an English father and Welsh mother, Karen and brought up in the Mumbles area of the city, and has cerebral palsy. The characters she played in Zig Zag Love and The Story of Tracy Beaker also have this condition. In November 2009, she also had a part in Casualty, playing a patient with cerebral palsy called Serena Wark. The character's sister, Shona Wark, portrayed by Evelyn Hoskins, has reappeared several times as a recurring character, becoming involved in a storyline centring on character Charlie Fairhead (Derek Thompson), but despite this, Serena has never reappeared.

Cara has worked with BBC Ouch! to share life experiences about her disability. From 2011, she has starred in the BBC Wales series Baker Boys as Elen, the daughter of Eve Myles' character Sarah. In 2014, she featured in episode 5 (of 8) of the Sky One drama The Smoke alongside Jodie Whittaker, starring as a receptionist. From 2021 to 2023 she featured in CBeebies show Biff & Chip as Sam.
