= The Story of Tracy Beaker series 1 =

The Story of Tracy Beaker
- Season 1
- Series One Title Card
- Starring: Dani Harmer; Montanna Thompson; Chelsie Padley; Joe Starrs; Sonny Muslim; Jay Haher; Rochelle Gadd; Jerome Holder; Sharlene Whyte; Connor Byrne; Clive Rowe
- No. of episodes: 26

Release
- Original network: CBBC
- Original release: 8 January – 4 April 2002

Series chronology
- Next → Series 2

The first series of the British children's television series The Story of Tracy Beaker began broadcasting on 8 January 2002 on CBBC on BBC One and ended on 4 April 2002. The series follows the lives of the children living in the fictional children's care home of Stowey House, nicknamed by them "The Dumping Ground". It consists of twenty-six, fifteen-minute episodes. It is the first series in The Story of Tracy Beaker franchise.

== Cast ==
Dani Harmer plays the title character, Tracy Beaker, while Montanna Thompson plays her arch-enemy Justine Littlewood. Justine's best friend, Louise Govern, is played by Chelsie Padley and a young boy that looks up to Tracy, Peter Ingham, is played by Joe Starrs. The eldest resident, Adele Azupadi, is played by Rochelle Gadd and the youngest resident, Maxy, is played by Jerome Holder. Sonny Muslim and Jay Haher play brothers Ryan and Zac Patterson. Nisha Nayar plays the residents' social worker, Elaine Boyak - nicknamed 'Elaine the Pain' by the children - and Clive Rowe plays Stowey House's chef, Norman 'Duke' Ellington. Sharlene Whyte and Connor Byrne play careworkers, Jenny Edwards and Mike Milligan, with Jenny being head care worker. Lisa Coleman plays Tracy's potential foster parent, Cam Lawson and Luke Youngblood plays Tracy's friend, Ben Batambuze, whom she befriends in the series premiere.

=== Main ===
- Dani Harmer as Tracy Beaker
- Montanna Thompson as Justine Littlewood
- Chelsie Padley as Louise Govern
- Joe Starrs as Peter Ingham
- Sonny Muslim as Ryan Patterson
- Jay Haher as Zac Patterson
- Rochelle Gadd as Adele Azupadi
- Jerome Holder as Maxy King
- Sharlene Whyte as Jenny Edwards
- Connor Byrne as Mike Milligan
- Clive Rowe as Duke Ellington

=== Recurring ===
- Luke Youngblood as Ben Batambuze
- Nisha Nayar as Elaine Boyak
- Annette Bentley as Carly Beaker
- Lisa Coleman as Cam Lawson

=== Guest ===
- Louise Barrett as Julie
- Kim MacDonald as Ted
- Roger Goold as Gorilla Boyfriend
- Simon Ludders as Brian Gee
- Natasha Estelle Williams as Ben's Mum (2/26)
- Ysobel Gonzalez as Miss Sharpe (2/26)
- Paul Mari as Terry Brown (2/26)
- Maggie Wells as Jill Brown (2/26)
- Max Digby as Mr Pugh
- Jody Jameson as Shoe Shop Assistant
- Imogen Brown as Samantha
- Isobel Middleton as Samantha's Mum
- Louisa Milwood Haigh as Leah
- Paula Bacon as Martha Leach

== Episodes ==
No. in series	Title	Directed by	Written by	Original release date	Prod. code
1	"Tracy Returns"	Susan Tully	Elly Brewer	8 January 2002	1.1
Tracy returns to the Dumping Ground but finds new girl Justine Littlewood has taken her room, and the two girls become enemies after Tracy breaks Justine's alarm clock. Tracy tries to escape the Dumping Ground and makes friends with a boy called Ben who claims he's living on the streets. Notes: First appearance of: Dani Harmer (Tracy Beaker), Montanna Thompson (Justine), Chelsie Padley (Louise), Joe Starrs (Peter), Sonny Muslim (Ryan), Jay Haher (Zac), Rochelle Gadd (Adele), Luke Youngblood (Ben), Jerome Holder (Maxy), Sharlene Whyte (Jenny), Connor Byrne (Mike) and Clive Rowe (Duke).; Also starring: Luke Youngblood (Ben); Guest starring: Louise Barrett (Julie), Kim MacDonald (Ted), Stephen Lloyd-Crossley (Steve)
2	"Dares"	David Skynner	Elly Brewer	10 January 2002	1.2
Tracy goes head-to-head with Justine in a game of dares so that she can win back her old bedroom. Notes: First appearance: Nisha Nayar (Elaine), Annette Bentley (Tracy's Mum); Also starring: Nisha Nayar (Elaine), Annette Bentley (Tracy's Mum); Guest starring: Roger Goold (Gorilla Boyfriend)
3	"Sneaking in Ben"	Susan Tully	Andy Walker	15 January 2002	1.3
After Louise chooses Justine over her, a miserable Tracy meets Ben again and smuggles him into the DG. Meanwhile, Duke is having problems with mice in his kitchen and plots to hunt them down, whilst Zac and Ryan try to stop him. Notes: Absent: Connor Byrne (Mike); Also starring: Luke Youngblood (Ben); Guest starring: Roger Goold (Gorilla Boyfriend)
4	"Cam's First Visit"	Susan Tully	Elly Brewer	17 January 2002	1.4
Writer Cam Lawson visits the DG, and everyone is excited, especially Tracy, who wants to become a writer. But unfortunately, her attempts to make a good impression backfire and she fights with Justine when she provokes her. Meanwhile, Mike is tricked into giving older girl Adele a late night pass. Note: First appearance: Lisa Coleman as Cam Lawson
5	"Child of the Week"	Susan Tully	Elly Brewer	22 January 2002	1.5
Tracy is delighted when she is chosen for "Child of the Week", an advertisement in the local paper. But she is horrified when Louise is also chosen and they hatch a plan to get them fostered. Meanwhile, Duke starts a new healthy eating regime, but his new ideas don't go down well with the kids. Absent: Lisa Coleman- Cam
6	"The Truth is Revealed"	Susan Tully	Carol Russell	24 January 2002	1.6
Tracy is filled with jealousy when Justine's dad gives her money to decorate her room and leaves the DG to join Ben on the streets. However, when Ben injures himself and Mike is called out, she discovers her friend has lied to her about being homeless. Meanwhile, all the kids (bar Adele) are forced to help Justine decorate her room but she ends up alienating the whole house with her demands.
7	"Never Ever Wanna See Him Again"	Susan Tully	Mary Morris	29 January 2002	1.7
It's Tracy's birthday, and also unfortunately for her, young Peter's. He's extremely excited, but Tracy is not best pleased especially as Peter is fond of her. On the day of their birthday, Tracy discovers her mum has sent a birthday card but Mike soon discovers everything isn't what it seems. Meanwhile, when the birthday party is ruined, Ben spots an opportunity to reconcile with Tracy.
8	"The 1000 Words About Tracy"	Susan Tully	Arnold Evans	31 January 2002	1.8
Cam makes a return visit to the home to interview Tracy for her article. As Tracy and Cam talk, Tracy tries to talk Cam into looking for her mum for her. Cam agrees, but she soon discovers it's not that simple. Meanwhile, Cam asks Justine and Louise to make a documentary about life in the home. They start to make one, until Ryan points out that they could make a more interesting film and make money from it. Soon, it's Girls V Boys, which causes both chaos and embarrassment for the staff.
9	"Bad Peter"	Susan Tully	Mary Morris	7 February 2002	1.9
Tracy is excitedly waiting to be taken out for the day. However, when Tracy sees who's going to be taking her out – Terry and Jill Brown – she's horrified to see they are old. On the other hand, Peter likes the look of them. The day out doesn't go well, as Tracy is too lively for Terry and Jill to cope with. But a vengeful Tracy persuades Peter to become bad so that the Browns will not foster him, bringing chaos to the DG and completely shattering her friendship with Peter.
10	"Cam's Place"	Susan Tully	Andy Walker	12 February 2002	1.10
It's a busy Saturday at the DG: Tracy is going out with Cam, Louise with an aunt, Justine is waiting for her dad and the boys are waiting for a football match to start.
11	"Dumping Ground Virus"	David Skynner	Elly Brewer	14 February 2002	1.11
When everyone at the DG is struck down with the bug, Elaine has been, unfortunately, alerted and arrives to take control.
12	"Justine's Telly"	Susan Tully	Elly Brewer	19 February 2002	1.12
Tracy has been made editor of the Dumping Ground newsletter, and is determined to find an exciting story. When she learns that Elaine has given Justine permission to have a television in her room, even though it is against the house rules, she starts a campaign to get Elaine sacked. Meanwhile, the kids begin paying Justine to allow them to watch her TV at night, but chaos occurs when she finds out that she is double booked by Adele and the boys.
13	"Tracy and Cam Row"	Susan Tully	Elly Brewer	21 February 2002	1.13
Tracy is becoming increasingly frustrated with Cam, who has still not decided whether or not to foster her. Banned from phoning her, Tracy enlists Ben's help to go to see Cam in person. When they arrive at her flat, Cam is out, so Tracy and Ben rearrange the furniture, play music and eat her food. Meanwhile, Justine and Louise go head-to-head with Zac and Ryan when they begin washing cars for money, leading to a big waterfight outside the DG.
14	"Sleepover"	David Skynner	Mary Morris	26 February 2002	1.14
Tracy, Justine and Louise have been invited to a sleepover, but the rules of the care home don't allow them to go. The three of them unite in their determination to go anyway. But can Tracy and Justine work together? Meanwhile, the boys are camping outside in the back garden but Duke decides to camp with them, much to their disappointment.
15	"Parent's Evening"	Susan Tully	Laura Summers	28 February 2002	1.15
It's Tracy's parents' evening and she has to put up with Elaine the Pain seeing her teacher. Elaines worried about Tracy's schooling and is expecting a bad report – if she gets to see Tracy's teacher that is. Meanwhile, Peter has trouble with a bully, so the boys pitch in to change his clothing style.
16	"The Postcard"	Susan Tully	Roger Griffiths	5 March 2002	1.16
Justine is giving her dad a hard time for not visiting when he said he would. He said he left a message – and he did. Tracy took the message, but just forgot to pass it on, causing tension between the two of them. Meanwhile, a postcard arrives to the DG addressed to Tracy – from her mother. But can its genuinity be proven? Meanwhile, Ryan and Zac play sick to go to a sci-fi exhibition under the staff's nose (to get out of a karate course), but the tickets go missing...
17	"Where’s the Work"	David Skynner	Arnold Evans	12 March 2002	1.17
Tracy will not hand in her homework. She claims a dog ran off with her book, but not even Elaine The Pain will fall for that one. She insists that Tracy is lying to cover up for not doing the homework and makes Tracy stay in the 'Quiet Room' until Tracy can account for the missing homework.
18	"Helpful Tracy"	David Skynner	Mary Morris	19 March 2002	1.18
Tracy tries to become clean and tidy at the DG, believing Cam doesn't want to foster her for her bad behavior. Meanwhile, it's Maxy's clothing allowance day and it nearly ends in disaster when Maxy locks himself, Jenny's minivan keys and Mike's spare keys in the van all over a pair of trainers that Jenny liked but Maxy didn't. Meanwhile, Peter is trying to improve his football skills and accidentally hits Cam.
19	"New Girl"	David Skynner	Laura Summers	14 March 2002	1.19
Samantha is an eleven-year-old girl whose life is dominated by her mother. When her mother is rushed to hospital, Samantha must stay at the DG, where she strikes up a close bond with Tracy. Meanwhile there is a headlice epidemic in the house.
20	"Treasure Hunt"	David Skynner	Laura Summers	5 February 2002	1.20
Elaine's decided the best way to get everybody together will be a Treasure Hunt. Naturally, it doesn't go according to plan. Tracy and Jenny pair up and discover that the prize is packets of coloured pencils.
21	"Romance"	David Skynner	Elly Brewer	7 March 2002	1.21
Tracy believes if Cam finds a man and get married, she will foster her. She sets her up with Mike, as she seems to like him. Meanwhile, at the DG, the tables are turned on Jenny and Duke when Justine and Louise decide to swap roles with them for the day following a bust up over each other's make-up.
22	"Temporary Care Worker"	David Skynner	Othniel Smith	21 March 2002	1.22
It's clothing allowance day. Tracy has been saving up and wants Jenny to take her out to get a whole new wardrobe. What she gets is Leah, a temporary care worker who's filling in while Jenny's in hospital following an operation. But when everyone takes a trip to town, Tracy ensures that Leah is about to experience a day from hell.
23	"Cut the Weed"	David Skynner	Graham Alborough	26 March 2002	1.23
It's Peter's last day at the DG before he goes to live with Terry and Jill. Everyone attends his party, except Tracy, who is secretly looking after two giant African land snails for the weekend. Later that night, the snails escape and everyone is secretly roaming the corridors of the DG - including Peter, who has run away from his new life before it has even begun. Note: Departure of Peter Ingham (Joe Starrs)
24	"Need Armbands"	David Skynner	Laura Summers	28 March 2002	1.24
Tracy has had enough of waiting for Cam after she cancels their afternoon of swimming. Tracy visits Ben and realises his parents would be perfect for her.
25	"Miss You"	David Skynner	Mary Morris	2 April 2002	1.25
Mike announces that he is leaving to work at another care home. Tracy's heartbroken by this and gets angry with him. Can Mike repair his relationship with Tracy before his last day? Meanwhile, The kids sacrifice their new DVD player to buy Mike a farewell gift. Note: Departed: Connor Byrne as Mike Milligan.
26	"The End!"	David Skynner	Elly Brewer	4 April 2002	1.26
When Cam begins flat hunting, Tracy is convinced she will be moving in with her. But when Cam once again becomes doubtful over the idea, the pair have a huge argument and Tracy storms off. Back at the DG, it's make or break time as Cam makes her final decision. Meanwhile the DG residents and carers are busy creating a wall mural of residents and carers past and present after Jenny hosted a discussion with the other residents about something to remember residents and carers by when they come and go, as Adele is going to move out soon. In the end, everyone says a goodbye to Tracy as she lives with Cam with Mike returning to say goodbye as well before working at another care home. Note: Last appearance: Connor Byrne as Mike Milligan (until Series 5), Joe Starrs as Peter Ingham, Sonny Muslim as Ryan Patterson, Jay Haher as Zac Patterson & Jerome Holder as Maxy King

== Production ==
Cas Lester was the executive producer and Jane Dauncey was the producer for this series, and the filming took place in late 2001. Susan Tully and David Skynner directed an equal thirteen episodes each. Elly Brewer wrote nine episodes, Mary Morris wrote five episodes and Laura Summers wrote four episodes. Andy Walker and Arnold Evans wrote two episodes each and Carol Russell, Roger Griffiths, Othniel Smith and Graham Alborough all wrote one episode each. Brewer continued to write for Tracy Beaker franchise for another nine series, until the second series of The Dumping Ground, which is the second spin-off of The Story of Tracy Beaker.

== Awards and nominations ==
Ceremony	Award	Nominee	Result
2002 Children's BAFTA Awards	Children's Drama	The Story of Tracy Beaker	Nominated

== Ratings ==
Episode no.	Total viewers	CBBC weekly ranking
1	267,000	—
2	363,000	1
3	499,000	1
4	233,000	—
5	278,000	8
6	315,000	6
7	221,000	—
8	261,000	3
9	242,000	4
10	423,000	1
11	444,000	1
12	417,000	1
13	526,000	1
14	658,000	6
15	215,000	3
16	215,000	—
17	145,000	—
18	10,000	—
19	815,000	1
20	234,000	10
21	415,000	10
22	615,000	1
23	522,000	1
24	195,000	9
25	395,000	5
26	515,000	1

== Schools repeats ==
In spring 2003, four episodes of Series 1 were repeated as part of BBC Two's weekday morning strand on educational programmes for schools. No episodes of subsequent series were shown in this block.
