= Godzilla in popular culture =

As a symbol of post-World War II cinematic history, the irradiated giant monster Godzilla has been referenced and parodied numerous times in popular culture. Godzilla and other atomic monsters have appeared in a variety of mediums, including cartoons, film, literature, television, and video games.

== Name usage ==
"-zilla" is a well-known slang suffix, used to imply some form of excess to a person, object or theme; some examples being the reality show Bridezillas and the Netscape-derived web browser Mozilla Firefox. "-

The Mesozoic dinosaur Gojirasaurus quayi is a coelophysid named in Godzilla's honor. Over five meters in length, it was originally considered one of the largest theropods of the Late Triassic period. The species was discovered in New Mexico by paleontologist Kenneth Carpenter, who is an admitted Godzilla fan.

Dakosaurus andiniensis is a marine reptile of the Jurassic Period. It had a uniquely defined head similar to that of theropod dinosaurs, which has led to researchers nicknaming the species "Godzilla".

On at least two occasions, the name Godzilla has been used as a nickname for athletes. Former Washington Capitals and Tampa Bay Lightning goaltender Olaf Kolzig went by the nickname "Godzilla" (sometimes shortened to "'Zilla") and had a depiction of the monster painted on his goalie mask. Japanese former baseball player Hideki Matsui also had the nickname "Godzilla" which represents his powerful hitting. Matsui had a cameo in the film Godzilla Against Mechagodzilla.

The Nissan GT-R sports car was famously nicknamed "Godzilla" by the Australian motoring publication Wheels in its July 1989 edition – a name that has stuck to this day. This became one of the subjects of the car games.

== Film and television ==
Godzilla has been featured in 39 films from 1954 to the present. In the United States, Godzilla films from Toho had been airing on television every week since 1960 up until the 1990s.

While Godzilla was not the true first kaijū film, the impact of the franchise was so strong that the title of the first kaijū became known as Godzilla. Subsequently, the success of the first Godzilla film, as well as the following sequels, influenced many different kaijū films using similar practical effects.

Motifs from the series have been echoed, parodied or paid tribute to in numerous later films. Godzilla movies were frequently a target for commentary by the Mystery Science Theater 3000 television series, which parodied B-movies.

Bambi Meets Godzilla is the title of a humorous 1969 Canadian cartoon created entirely by Marv Newland. In 1994 it was voted #38 of the 50 Greatest Cartoons of all time by members of the animation field. Only two minutes long, this cartoon is considered a classic by many animation fans.

Godzilla has also faced pop culture icons such as King Kong, in addition to the discarded project Frankenstein vs. Godzilla (which became Frankenstein vs. Baragon), and the case of the fan film Wolfman vs. Godzilla, where Godzilla faces a version of the Werewolf which has been mutated by radiation.

Hanna-Barbera created an animated TV series about Godzilla in 1978. The series only lasted for two seasons. Tri-Star and Sony created another animated TV series in 1998 that was a sequel to the first American remake. This series also only lasted for two seasons.

Godzilla has appeared in many Robot Chicken parodies. In one, for instance, Godzilla and his wife are lying in bed and his wife says "I don't know, maybe if we use some toys?", then Mechagodzilla walks into frame cheering with a dildo coming out of his chest.

Godzilla made a cameo appearance (in a clip from Godzilla vs. Biollante) in the 1996 comedy, Mars Attacks!. Godzilla also made an appearance in the Happy Tree Friends episode 'Wingin' It' when he attacks (and presumably devours) Flaky. A Godzilla action figure was present all throughout the sitcom Roseanne from the series premiere to the series finale.

Steven Spielberg cited Godzilla as an inspiration for Jurassic Park (1993), specifically Godzilla, King of the Monsters! (1956), which he grew up watching. During its production, Spielberg described Godzilla as "the most masterful of all the dinosaur movies because it made you believe it was really happening." Godzilla also influenced the Spielberg film Jaws (1975), and he also included Mechagodzilla in his 2018 film Ready Player One and Godzilla and Rodan frequently in the cartoon series Animaniacs, which Spielberg produced.

Godzilla has been cited as an inspiration by actor Tim Allen and filmmakers Martin Scorsese and Tim Burton.

The 2007 film Always: Sunset on Third Street 2 featured a cameo appearance from Godzilla.

A snowed up version of Godzilla known as Snow Godzilla makes a couple surprise appearances in the 2019 Japanese anime film Shinkansen Henkei Robo Shinkalion the Movie: The Marvelous Fast ALFA-X That Comes From the Future. Godzilla also made a guest appearance in the show Crayon Shin-chan as an antagonist.

In 1991, two Godzilla films, Godzilla vs. Megalon and Godzilla versus the Sea Monster, were shown on the movie-mocking TV show Mystery Science Theater 3000.

A parody creature resembling Godzilla, alongside another parody character resembling what appears to be a hybrid between Ultraman and Kamen Rider, appears in the television special Olive, the Other Reindeer during the song "Merry Christmas After All", during part of which Olive, Santa and the other reindeer are shown passing through Tokyo delivering gifts. The two characters are shown to be friendly and taking part in the song and dance routine shown to include numerous figures, both real and fictional, in the show in various locations visited by the team as they make Santa's annual trip around the world.

Godzilla has been referenced multiple times in the American animated TV sitcom The Simpsons. Godzilla first appeared in the episode "Lisa on Ice" when Lisa imagines herself on Monster Island and is chased by various kaiju, including Godzilla. It has also been referenced in "Treehouse of Horror VI", "Mayored to the Mob" (where Godzilla can be seen signing autographs at the Bi-Mon-Sci-Fi-Con), "Thirty Minutes over Tokyo" (in which the plane carrying the Simpson family is being attacked by Godzilla, Rodan, Mothra and Gamera), "Simpsons Tall Tales", "Treehouse of Horror XVI", "Homerazzi", "Wedding for Disaster", "The Real Housewives of Fat Tony", "Treehouse of Horror XXIV" and "Treehouse of Horror XXVI".

Godzilla appeared in the Family Guy episode "The Peanut Butter Kid". In a cutaway gag Godzilla arrives to attack Haiti only to discover that it is already in shambles and return to the ocean.

== Godzilla's roar in non-Toho media ==
- In the Japanese anime series Shinzo, the monster Grandora has the same roar as Godzilla.
- The end of Hercules (1958) has a monster guarding the Golden Fleece that emits Godzilla's roar.
- In Godzilla effects creator Eiji Tsuburaya's 1966 television series Ultra Q, several of the featured kaiju emit either Godzilla's roar or a variation of it.
- In the 1982 film The Last Unicorn, Godzilla's roar is heard coming from a green dragon that Prince Lír fights during a song.
- In the Japanese anime series Mazinger Z, several of the villainous mechanical beasts use Godzilla's roar.
- In the OVA anime film Gall Force: Eternal Story, the roar can be heard when Paranoid Commander Dorn's ship transforms into a surface-walking mecha.
- When Mongo the Gingerbread Man's gumdrop button falls off in Shrek 2, he makes the same sound as Godzilla's roar.
- In the Pokémon episode "Ditto's Mysterious Mansion", the character Jessie gets mad and yells with Godzilla's roar at Ditto.
- In Danny Phantom, Godzilla's roar is frequently used for the more monstrous ghosts in the series.
- In Muteking, The Dashing Warrior episode 31, Takokichi turns into a monster like Godzilla.
- In The Simpsons' couch gag for the episode "Homerazzi" where Homer's evolution is featured, Bart and Lisa are depicted as dinosaurs, with both of them emitting Godzilla's roar.
- In The Simpsons episode "30 Minutes Over Tokyo" (Season 10, Episode 23, #AABF20), the family's flight home is briefly interrupted by a monster attack on Tokyo, featuring Godzilla, Rodan, Mothra and Gamera. Godzilla roars as he attacks their plane and again when they fly away. His roar is heard even after the episode has faded to black.
- When in "Simpsons Tall Tales" Homer, in his role as the giant Paul Bunyan, fights Rodan, Rodan roars like Godzilla.
- In the first segment of The Simpsons Halloween episode "Treehouse of Horror VI", "Attack of the 50 Foot Eyesores", Homer steals the Lard Lad's giant doughnut. The Lard Lad gets struck by lightning and comes to life. Then he pulls his feet off the ground, stomps into the middle of the street, and emits Godzilla's roar.
- In Camp Lazlo, Elebug metamorphoses into a monster in the episode "Creepy Crawly Campy" and emits Godzilla's roar.
- In Batman: The Brave and the Bold, Chemo emits a Godzilla-like roar in the episode "Clash of the Metal Men!".
- Godzilla's roar can be heard in the episode of Total Drama Island "Camp Castaways".
- In The Grim Adventures of Billy & Mandy, the episode title "Giant Billy and Mandy All-Out Attack" refers to Godzilla, Mothra and King Ghidorah: Giant Monsters All-Out Attack. In the episode "The Incredible Shrinking Mandy", when Mandy becomes a giant after Billy puts a curse on her, she goes to Sassy Cat Land and also does a Godzilla-like roar, scaring everyone away from the amusement park.
- The South Park episode "Mecha-Streisand" parodies the Godzilla series heavily and also features Godzilla's roar.
- In an episode of Catscratch ("The King of All Root Beer"), Waffle and Mr. Blik fight each other over the city. Godzilla's roar is also heard multiple times, along with Rodan's.
- Chappelle's Show features a skit in which Dave Chappelle appears as a giant version of himself and is labeled "Blackzilla" by a Japanese city he attacks. After fighting and beating the real Godzilla, the skit becomes complete with Dave making the signature roar of said movie monster.
- In the Star Trek: The Animated Series episode "Yesteryear", Godzilla's roar was used as part of the sound of a Vulcan creature called the Le-matya.
- In an episode of Malcolm in the Middle Godzilla is referenced twice; first, when Malcolm comments on the Godzilla suit looking fake and later, when Lois trips on a Lego city, she bumps into the buildings and her voice is slowed down to sound like Godzilla's roar.
- The Japanese heavy-metal band Seikima-II used Godzilla's roar to begin their live shows. They have also used the roar in their song "Kemonotachi No Hakaba". Seikima-II vocalist and leader Demon Kogure, a fan of Godzilla, won a Godzilla roar-alike contest in 1983 and later made a brief cameo in Godzilla vs. Biollante (1989).
- Acid Mothers Temple 2006 album Starless and the Bible Black Sabbath features Godzilla's roar at the end of the final track.
- On the soundtrack album to the 1998 American Godzilla, Green Day remixed their song "Brain Stew" with Godzilla's roar.
- Sir Mix-A-Lot's song "Posse on Broadway" samples Godzilla's roar repeatedly throughout the song.
- The punk band Adrenalin O.D. included Godzilla's roar on "Return to Beneath the Planet of AOD vs. Godzilla Strikes Again in 3D", the B-side to their single "A Nice Song in the Key of 'D'".
- The German EDM band Moskwa TV employed Godzilla's roar in one version ("Godzilla Remix") of its song "Generator 7/8".
- In an episode of the online series The Angry Video Game Nerd which focuses on Godzilla video games, the title character is overwhelmed by the poor quality of retro Godzilla games and rampages in his room, making frequent use of Godzilla's roar.
- In a few episodes of The Land Before Time television series, the T. rex Red Claw sometimes uses the American Godzilla's roar.
- In a Chowder episode, Godzilla's roar was used to describe Truffle when she plays Mahjong as a Mahjongasaur.
- In the video game New Super Mario Bros. 2, Reznor's roar bears a strong resemblance to Godzilla's roar.
- In the Young Justice episode "Secrets", Miss Martian uses Godzilla's roar while impersonating Marvin the Martian.
- In both the Hellsing and Fist of the North Star anime, Godzilla's roar can be heard throughout multiple episodes, often well hidden within the soundtrack.
- In the Turbo Fast episode "Turbo Drift", Skidnark references a bunch of Godzilla monsters such as MechaGodzilla, Regular Godzilla, Space Godzilla, Godzillasaurus and was going to say Minilla before Whiplash interrupted him by slapping him. Chet was stuck in a toy store, where he accidentally turns on a Voltron-like toy and a Godzilla-like toy with blades similar to Gigan's and which emitted Godzilla's roar.
- In the She-Ra and the Princesses of Power episode "Destiny", a giant robot built by Entrapta scares off a group of Beast Island monsters emitting Godzilla's roar.
- In Lego Batman 3: Beyond Gotham, an animatronic T.Rex in Batcave’s Trophy Room uses the Tristar Godzilla roar when activated, Plastic Man also uses the roar when the player transforms him into a T.Rex in the chapter “Big Trouble in Little Gotham”

== Literature ==
Many books have been released pertaining to Godzilla and the Godzilla series, including various collection books and manga.

Gojiro is the 1991 debut novel by former Esquire columnist Mark Jacobson. It reinterprets the Godzilla film series from the perspective of the daikaiju—not a fictional creature depicted on-screen via suitmation, but an irradiated varanid–turned–B-movie star named Gojiro (an homage to Gojira, the Japanese name for Godzilla).

Random House Publishing produced four novels for teens and young adults by Marc Cerasini based on Godzilla, respectively entitled Godzilla Returns (1996), Godzilla 2000 (1997) (which had no relation to the film that would later use that name), Godzilla at World's End (1998) and Godzilla vs. the Robot Monsters (1999). A fifth novel, also by Cerasini, Godzilla and the Lost Continent, which would have finished the series, was completed and planned for a release in 1999, but never published (it remains so to this day). These books, as well as four novels aimed at juvenile readers in their late childhood and early teenage years by Scott Ciencin, respectively entitled Godzilla, King of the Monsters (1996), no relation to the 1956 film of the same name, Godzilla Invades America (1997), Godzilla: Journey to Monster Island (1998) and Godzilla vs. the Space Monster (1998), and several picture books aimed at younger readers ages four and up, were produced during the late 1990s and the first half of 2000. Some of the novels written by Marc Cerasini present Godzilla as a force of nature much like in the Heisei series, neither truly good nor evil, with Mothra appearing in two of the books as a benevolent, supernatural and sentient creature who occasionally made a point to help people when other monsters threatened the Earth.

=== Comic book adaptations ===
Godzilla has appeared in Marvel and Dark Horse Comics, both times under the title Godzilla, King of the Monsters. Marvel's run of Godzilla, King of the Monsters was produced in the late 1970s and lasted 24 issues, while Dark Horse had the license for the creature's American appearances since the late 1980s onward and produced a 17-issue run, along with various other appearances and special issues. Dark Horse also produced a six-issue miniseries which was a translated version of a manga adaptation of the Japanese version of the 16th Godzilla film, The Return of Godzilla (a.k.a. Godzilla 1985 in its American release), under the title Godzilla and it was later collected into a trade paperback under the same title.

The character Warlock of the New Mutants took on the shape of Godzilla as he appeared in King Kong vs. Godzilla in Web of Spider-Man Annual #2 (1986). Marvel has recently re-released their series in book form as Essential Godzilla, King of the Monsters, which collects the entire 24-issue run in black-and-white. IDW Publishing has also produced various comics based on the Godzilla character since 2011; these include an ongoing mainstream storyline told in three series: Godzilla: Kingdom of Monsters (12 issues), Godzilla (13 issues), and Godzilla: Rulers of Earth (25 issues). There were also seven five-issue miniseries, all with separate non-connected storylines: Godzilla: Gangsters and Goliaths, Godzilla: Legends (an anthology miniseries with five individual stories), Godzilla: The Half-Century War, Godzilla: Cataclysm, Godzilla in Hell, Godzilla: Oblivion, and Godzilla: Rage Across Time.

== Games ==
=== Video games ===
The first Godzilla game was an unofficial game made by The Code Works for the Commodore 64 PC in 1983. Godzilla would make his first official appearance three years later as one of the playable monsters in The Movie Monster Game by Epyx also for the Commodore 64 PC. In 1983, a Godzilla knock-off called Goshzilla appeared in this game's predecessor, Crush, Crumble and Chomp! Godzilla would get his own games on the NES such as Godzilla: Monster of Monsters! and Godzilla 2: War of the Monsters. He had his own game on the original Game Boy simply titled Godzilla. Godzilla would make an unauthorized appearance in early versions of the game Revenge Of Shinobi. Because of the copyright issues, he was removed from latter releases. For the newer consoles, he appeared in the game Godzilla: Destroy All Monsters Melee, the first of a trilogy of Godzilla games. It has since been followed by two sequels, Godzilla: Save the Earth and Godzilla: Unleashed. Godzilla has also appeared in Godzilla Generations and Godzilla Generations: Maximum Impact! in Japan. A game for the Tristar Godzilla was released, based on the cartoon show Godzilla: The Series and shared the name of the series when it was released on Game Boy Color. A sequel to this game followed with Godzilla: The Series – Monster Wars (also for Game Boy Color). Godzilla also appears in the game Kyoei Toshi, and a Godzilla costume was also added to Fall Guys.

The "Monster" disaster in the computer game SimCity depicted an unnamed green monster that resembled Godzilla. A scenario in the game: Tokyo, Japan 1954 parodies the original movie. The depiction of the monster in-game and on the boxart led to legal issues with Toho, with Maxis changing the Monster's design in-game and swapping it on the packaging for the "Tornado" disaster instead.

The Rampage series of video games is heavily inspired by both the Godzilla and King Kong films. Players take control of gigantic monsters as they destroy all the buildings in a city and survive onslaughts of military forces. One of the monsters is a female lizard/dinosaur monster named Lizzie, who resembles and is clearly based on Godzilla. In an issue of Nintendo Power in an advertisement for the Rampage: World Tour game for the Game Boy Color, they give the reason why Lizzie is destructive. It is because she broke up with Godzilla and is taking her anger out on the world.

The Pokémon series features Tyranitar, a Pokémon directly influenced by Godzilla. Its powered-up form, "Mega Tyranitar", bears an even greater resemblance to the King of Monsters, with similar body proportions. In addition, Pokémon Scarlet and Violet introduced two Pokémon based on kaiju. The first is the Paldea region's pseudo-legendary Pokémon, Baxcalibur, which evolves from Frigibax at Level 54 as a reference to how the first Godzilla movie came out in 1954. The other is Iron Thorns, a version of Tyranitar that comes from the future via time travel. Its appearance is based on Kaiju, like Tyranitar, but it may also reference the kaiju movies in Pokémon Black and White 2 that you can film at an in-game location called Pokestar Studios.

Game designer Hideki Kamiya (known for games such as Resident Evil 2, Devil May Cry, Viewtiful Joe, Ōkami, Bayonetta and The Wonderful 101) said he loved Godzilla and Ultraman as a child.

In Borderlands: The Pre-Sequel! "Iwajira", a boss in the game, gets his name from a combination of the word Iwa, which means "rock" in Japanese, and the end of the name Gojira, which is Godzilla's actual Japanese name.

Godzilla, alongside King Kong, were added to Call of Duty: Warzone as a part of the limited time "Operation Monarch" game mode. In both Warzone and Call of Duty: Vanguard, a Godzilla themed bundle was released, including a skin for operator Shigenori Ota.

Godzilla was added as a playable DLC character in Super Monkey Ball Banana Rumble in November 2024.

An outfit based on Godzilla's appearance in the Monsterverse franchise was added to Fortnite Battle Royale in January 2025, as part of the Chapter 6 Season 1 Battle Pass. A playable boss was also featured as a game mechanic in the game in late January.

=== Other ===
Godzilla appears as an enemy in one of the final missions of the Williams pinball table Red & Ted's Road Show, in which the titular protagonists use a bulldozer to slow him down while he is attacking San Francisco.

The Magic the Gathering card game expansion set Ikoria: Lair of Behemoths has a crossover with the Godzilla series with a total of 19 promotional cards.

In 1977, Blue Öyster Cult had a major hit, "Godzilla", from their album Spectres. The song is a tongue-in-cheek tribute. Scottish indie group Ballboy included a song called "Godzilla vs. The Island of Manhattan (With You and I Somewhere in Between)" on their 2008 album I Worked On The Ships. On the album cover of Stomping Ground for the band Goldfinger, the members of the band are featured as human versions of Godzilla monsters; one member is even seen using Godzilla's trademark atomic breath and Mothra is seen in the background. The album cover of Teri Yakimoto for the band Guttermouth features a picture of Godzilla.

The French metal band Gojira acquired their name from the original Japanese name of Godzilla. Brazilian metal band Sepultura has a song titled "Biotech is Godzilla", co-written with Jello Biafra, which remarks on the impacts of biotechnology in contemporary life. The song is featured in their 1993 album, Chaos A.D.. R&B recording artist Ginuwine sampled Godzilla's roar on the song "What's So Different" from his 1998 sophomore album 100% Ginuwine. Rapper MF Doom recorded an album titled Take Me to Your Leader under the alias King Geedorah, inspired by Godzilla's famous three-headed nemesis, King Ghidorah.

Oakland, CA rapper Yukmouth titled his third album Godzilla. The rapper also used the monster's name for an independent record label, but closed it down after receiving legal pressure from Toho in May 2007. In the musical The Book of Mormon in the song "Two By Two", Mothra is referenced when one Latter Day Saint is given his mission to Japan. Pharoahe Monch's song "Simon Says" uses sound clips from the movie Godzilla vs. Mothra. The heavy metal band Iron Maiden uses Godzilla footage on their music video "Number of the Beast". Pop singer Kesha has a song describing a relationship with Godzilla on her 2017 album, Rainbow.

Godzilla is mentioned in the lyrics of "The Ultimate Showdown of Ultimate Destiny". Punk rock band Adrenalin O.D. have two instrumental songs titled "A.O.D. Vs. Godzilla" and "A.O.D. Vs. Son of Godzilla" on their albums The Wacky Hi-Jinks of Adrenalin O.D. and HumungousFungusAmongus. The 2001 German documentary film Berlin Babylon featured industrial music performed by Einstürzende Neubauten; one of these musical pieces is called "Godzilla in Mitte" - the monster used here as a metaphor for the extensive rebuilding projects in Berlin after the fall of the Berlin Wall.

In 2019 American rock band Think Sanity released their debut album featuring songs about Godzilla, Mothra, and Hedorah. The songs are titled "Sad Kaiju", "Mothra", and "Sludge" respectively. The monsters are also mentioned by name on the track "News at Six" in which they are comically described by newscaster Chip Bentley as destroying a nearby town. The band has mentioned in interviews that they have also written songs based on Biollante, King Ghidorah, and Rodan as well.

In January 2020, American rapper Eminem released the album Music to Be Murdered By. The album includes a track titled "Godzilla", featuring rapper Juice Wrld, which was released as a single later that month.

== Music ==
Blue Öyster Cult released the song "Godzilla" in 1977. It was the first track, and the second of four singles, from their fifth studio album Spectres (also 1977). Artists such as Fu Manchu, Racer X and Double Experience have included cover versions of this song on their albums. American musician Michale Graves wrote a song titled "Godzilla" for his 2005 album Punk Rock Is Dead. The lyrics mention Godzilla and several on-screen adversaries such as Mothra, Hedorah, Destoroyah and Gigan. The Brazilian heavy metal band Sepultura has a song titled "Biotech is Godzilla" on its 1993 release Chaos A.D.

The late Meco Monardo did use the Godzilla roar in the song "In The Beginning" back in 1977.

Composer Eric Whitacre wrote a piece for wind ensemble titled "Godzilla Eats Las Vegas!" The work was commissioned by Thomas Leslie of the University of Nevada, Las Vegas and was premiered in 1996 by the university's wind band. Annotations on the score instruct performers to dress in costume and a "script" is provided for the audience. Since the piece's premiere, it has been performed by notable ensembles including the United States Marine Band and the Scottish National Wind Symphony.

Michael Sembello had a song named "Godzilla" back in 1983, the year "Maniac" hit the top of the charts.

The French death metal band Gojira named the band after Godzilla's name in Japanese. The song "Simon Says" by Pharoahe Monch is a hip-hop remix of the "Godzilla March" theme song. The instrumental version of this song was notably used in the 2000 film Charlie's Angels. The British band Lostprophets released a song called "We Are Godzilla, You Are Japan" on its second studio album Start Something. The American punk band Groovie Ghoulies released a song called "Hats off to You (Godzilla)" as a tribute to Godzilla. It is featured on the EP Freaks on Parade released in 2002.

The American artist Doctor Steel released a song called 'Atomic Superstar' about Godzilla on his album People of Earth in 2002. In 2003, the British singer Siouxsie Sioux released the album Hái! with her band The Creatures; the album had a Japanese theme with a song dedicated to the monster, simply titled "Godzilla!". The record label Shifty issued the compilation album Destroysall with 15 songs from 15 bands, ranging from hardcore punk to doom-laden death metal. Not all of the songs are dedicated to Godzilla, but all do appear connected to monsters from Toho Studios. Fittingly, the disc was released on August 1, 2003, the 35th anniversary of the Japanese release of Destroy All Monsters.

King Geedorah (a.k.a. MF Doom) released Take Me to Your Leader, a hip-hop album featuring guests from the group Monsta Island Czars, another Godzilla-themed hip-hop group. These albums include multiple Godzilla samples throughout the series. Taiwanese American electronic musician Mochipet released the EP Godzilla Rehab Center on August 21, 2012, featuring songs named after monsters in the series including Gigan, King Ghidorah, Moguera and Hedorah.

In 2019, American rock band Think Sanity released their debut album featuring songs based on Godzilla, Mothra, and Hedorah. The songs are titled "Sad Kaiju", "Mothra", and "Sludge", respectively. The monsters are also mentioned by name on the track "News at Six" in which they are comically described by newscaster Chip Bentley as destroying a nearby town. The band has mentioned in interviews that they have also written songs based on Biollante, King Ghidorah, and Rodan as well.

Also in 2019, pop punk band Benny And The No-Goods released their song, “Gojira,” on the album “Nothing’s Cool.”

== Parodies ==
- In the 1981 short film Zilla, Horrible Monster Of The Deep, produced by Tom Kramer and aired on an episode of Fridays, the titular dinosaurlike creature stalks out of the ocean like Godzilla, but he is only human sized. He torments the populace by such modest antics as kicking sand at people, upending their shopping bags, knocking over trashcans, and so on. This was years before the introduction of Zilla as a true monster in the Godzilla franchise.
- A picture book by Dav Pilkey called Dogzilla was released in 1993. The book parodies Godzilla, who is replaced by a giant Cardigan Welsh Corgi.
- In the 1999 Disney/Pixar animated film Toy Story 2's deleted scene "Godzilla Rex", Rex (Wallace Shawn) pretending to be Godzilla who wants to destroy the city and Sarge (R. Lee Ermey) and the Green Army Men shooting with their guns but the guns do not work and Godzilla Rex knocking them with its tail, and everyone is running away except Buzz Lightyear (Tim Allen), who has a plunger gun and shoots it at Godzilla Rex causing Godzilla Rex to go on a Hot Wheels toy car and knocking over things until he holds onto a chair, making it fall on the Toddle Tots' fire truck which Sheriff Woody (Tom Hanks) is on and makes Sheriff Woody screaming and flying off the fire truck and goes through the window and lands on the rooftop and sliding his way from the rooftop and landing into the box.
- In the 2002 Disney film Lilo & Stitch, after being taken in by Lilo Pelekai, Stitch, a blue koala-like alien, runs around Lilo's room pretending to be Godzilla while destroying a scale-model of a city. In the same scene, Stitch destroys a bridge that closely resembles the Golden Gate Bridge in a similar manner to how the real bridge is destroyed by Godzilla in the 2014 Legendary film version. Coincidentally, in the 2014 film version, Godzilla makes his on-screen debut in Hawaii (Lilo & Stitch is set on the Hawaiian island of Kauai) before heading to San Francisco.
- In Stan Sakai's Usagi Yojimbo short story "Zylla", Miyamoto Usagi meets and befriends a freshly hatched, fire-breathing reptile uttering the syllables "zyl" and "la". "Zylla" subsequently saves Usagi from a gang of bandits, whereupon an awestruck Usagi wonders: "What are you? You look like a lizard but you breathe fire! Are you a god, Zylla?", and the creature responds with its fully joined name "Godzylla". In a later story, Usagi ends up using a magical sumi writing set to create a grown version of Zylla in order to fight a number of monsters created by that particular writing set. In a humorous extra short comic, Usagi meets - and vainly tries to fight - the actual Godzilla.
- The Polish cartoon TV series Bolek and Lolek features a saurian monster (in reference to Godzilla) as part of a Japanese director's monster star repertoire in the miniseries "Bolek and Lolek's Great Journey".
- In Rugrats, a green Tyrannosaurus with blue spikes over his back named Reptar, who is a spoof of Godzilla, makes frequent appearances; he is also accompanied by a Pteranodon ally, Dactar, who is a spoof of Rodan.
- In 1986, actor Bobcat Goldthwait donned a Godzilla costume for the film One Crazy Summer. When his character was needed somewhere, and the zipper to his Godzilla costume became stuck, he was forced to hightail it, while wearing the costume, to a presentation of a new lobster restaurant chain complete with miniature buildings. When the grandfather mistakes the head of the costume for an ash tray, and summarily disposes his cigar ashes in it, it send Golthwait's character into a frenzy, and in a nod to the Godzilla films, causes him to stomp on and destroy all of the miniature buildings, which the Japanese guests applaud at, mistaking the blunder for entertainment.
- The 1994 live-action Street Fighter film feature a scene in which E. Honda and Zangief do battle in a miniature city inside Bison's headquarters, complete with Godzilla's distinctive roar.
- The 1995 Filipino-language short film Junkzilla parodies the Godzilla series, featured the junk version of Godzilla that the transformation of garbage into a monster.
- The 1998 South Park episode "Mecha-Streisand" parodies the Godzilla series heavily, with celebrities such as Barbra Streisand as Mechagodzilla, Leonard Maltin as Ultraman, Sidney Poitier as Gamera, and Robert Smith as Mothra becoming the giant Godzilla-like monsters. A later episode, "Whale Whores", has Stan Marsh using a full-scale model Godzilla to scare away Japanese whalers and fishermen who have been preying on whales and dolphins at local sea parks and aquariums. Mecha-Streisand also returns in the 200th episode.
- In the 1999 The Simpsons episode "30 Minutes Over Tokyo" (Season 10, Episode 23, #AABF20), the family's flight home is briefly interrupted by a monster attack on Tokyo, featuring Godzilla, Rodan, Mothra and Gamera. Another show by Matt Groening, Futurama, contains a Godzilla reference. In the 2003 episode "The Devil's Hands are Idle Playthings", a "holophonor" opera (an opera played on a fictional holographic musical instrument) written by Philip J. Fry has a scene where Fry is being attacked by Godzilla.
- The Pinky and the Brain segment "Tokyo Grows" features a monster named Gollyzilla who periodically threatens Tokyo. The segment is frequently interrupted by cutaways to a Raymond Burr caricature saying "Yes, I see", a parody of the way Godzilla, King of the Monsters! interpolated footage of Burr reacting to events from the original Godzilla.
- In three episodes of the Oh My Goddess! spinoff series, The Adventures of Mini-Goddess, Gan the rat is turned into a parody of Godzilla named Gabira (ガビラ, Gabira).
- A 2007 episode of Tom and Jerry Tales titled "Zent Out of Shape" featured a grey version of Godzilla's fins and body that has Spike's face.
- The 1995 first-season finale episode of The Wayans Bros. titled "Brazilla vs. Rodney" (Brazilla being an obvious parody of Godzilla and the name Rodney being an obvious play on the name Barney) features Shawn and Marlon at a Japanese kid's birthday party dressed up as a mouse and cockroach while fighting another man dressed as a Godzilla-like dinosaur over a scale model city, scaring away all of the other people present and causing destruction similar to what is typically seen in Godzilla movies.
- In the game show Whammy! The All-New Press Your Luck one of the double whammies is a Godzilla-like whammy that destroys a city. The whammy's roar sounds exactly like Godzilla's. A dollar bill yells out, "Look, It's Whamzilla! Aahhh!" Then it runs into the camera, which drops bricks onto the contestant's head.
- In Austin Powers in Goldmember, the protagonists drive a Mini Cooper which gets caught on a Godzilla-like statue. A Japanese pedestrian (Brian Tee) shouts, "Run, it's Godzilla!" as civilians flee in fear. Another pedestrian (Masi Oka) replies, "It looks like Gojira, but due to international copyright laws, it's not!"-which is a clear reference to Toho being so strict on preserving the copyright of Godzilla.
- In Journey 2: The Mysterious Island, Sean Anderson (Josh Hutcherson) screams "Godzilla!" at a massive frill-necked lizard guarding its eggs.
- In the 2009 Family Guy episode "Road to the Multiverse", Brian appears as Godzilla. In the 2010 episode "Halloween on Spooner Street" a monster resembling Godzilla is shown getting blown up by Stewie's rocket after it misfires.
- In 101 Dalmatians: The Series the episodes "Four Stories Up" and "Oozy Does It" featured Spot as Godzilla.
- A Tiny Toon Adventures episode and segment titled "Bunny Daze" featured Babs Bunny as Babzilla that is a parody of Godzilla in her daydream.
- In the What's New, Scooby-Doo? episode "Big Appetite in Little Tokyo", Shaggy is tricked into thinking he has fallen victim to a curse that will turn him into a giant monster whenever he sleeps. The episode's villain of the day then frames him, using a giant robot resembling Shaggy as a Godzilla-like monster to destroy parts of Tokyo.
- In the episode "Chain Reaction of Mental Anguish" from the TV show 30 Rock, Tracy's "son" Donald opens a themed restaurant in Times Square featuring "Godzila, with one L, for trademark reasons."
- In 2018 Godzillo is a Pro Hero that appears in My Hero Academia: Two Heroes.
- In Mickey Mouse episode "Roll 'Em", one of the film productions Mickey Mouse and Minnie Mouse run through is homage to Godzilla.
- A parody film called Notzilla was released in 2020.
- In Episode 10 of the anime Monster Musume, Suu grows to a gigantic size and grows spikes resembling Godzilla's out of her back.
- SCP-2954 of the SCP Foundation is a looped performance consisting of six pieces of weaponry resembling satellite dishes that attack a species of vaguely Godzilla-like creatures. The weapons used to combat the Godzilla inspired species are based on the Maser Cannons seen in multiple of Toho's kaiju films.
- Triangle from Triangle vs Monkey made by Animator Jefferson Blunt usually Known as Blunt Brothers Productions. A 2021 Parody of Godzilla with 4 Released Seasons with a Scheduled Season 5. As of 2026, it has Amassed a Huge Fandom. Being the Fourth ever Indie Series in Theaters just after The Amazing Digital Circus.

== Geographic features ==
The largest megamullion, located 600 kilometres to the south-east of Okinotorishima, the southernmost Japanese island, is named the Godzilla Megamullion. The Japan Coast Guard played a role in name, reaching an agreement with Toho who owns the rights to Godzilla. Toho's Chief Godzilla officer Keiji Ota stated that "I am truly honored that (the megamullion) bears Godzilla's name, the Earth's most powerful monster."

== Astronomy ==
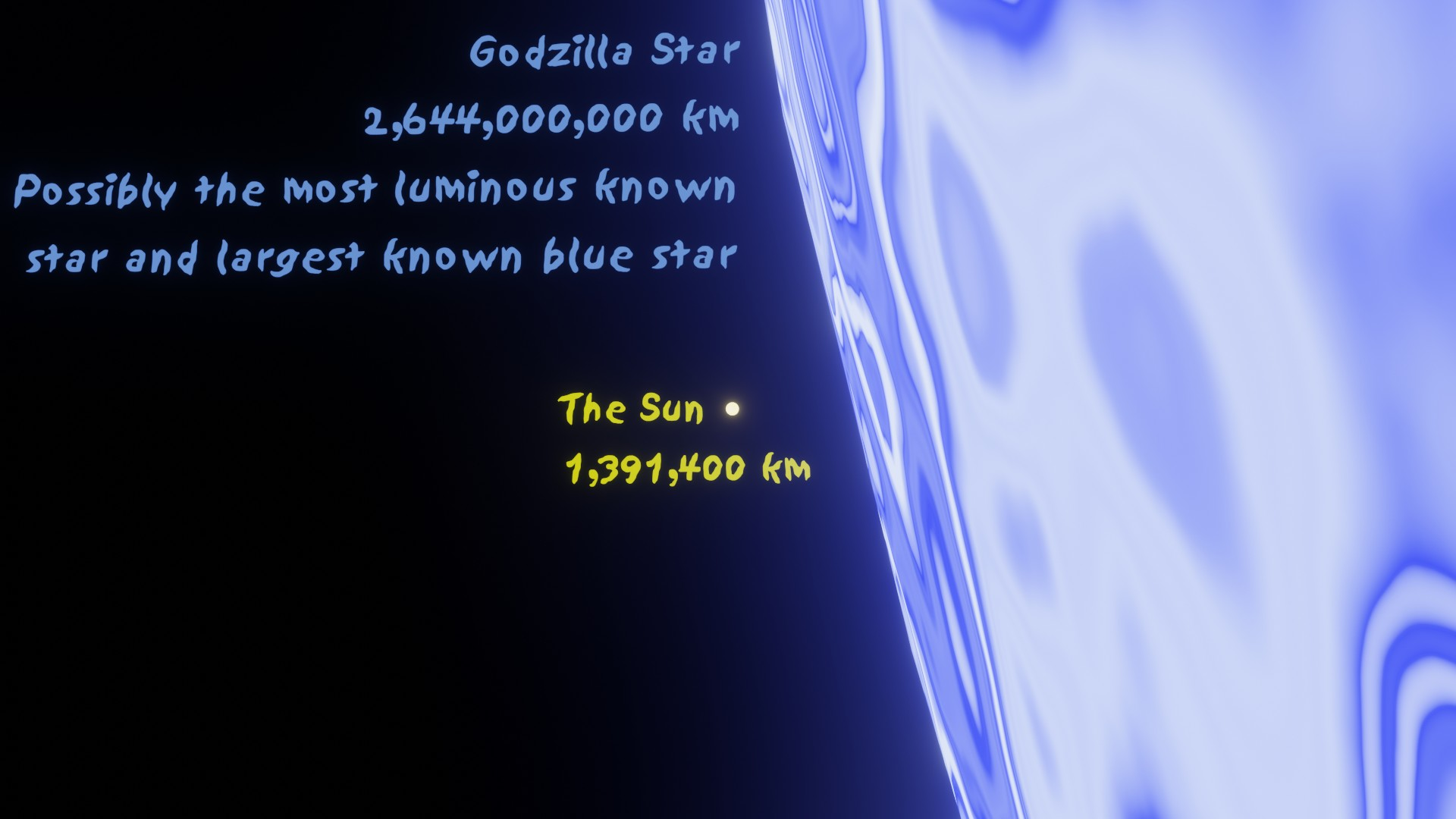
Size comparison between the Sun and Godzilla, assuming it is a single star.

Godzilla is a luminous blue variable star located in the Sunburst Galaxy, 10.9 billion light years away from Earth, identified using the Hubble Space Telescope. The name was chosen to reflect its properties: with a luminosity up to 255,000,000 times that of the Sun and a radius of up to 2,400 R_{☉}, it is possibly the most luminous individual star that can be currently observed and one of the largest stars known, with a diameter approaching or exceeding that of Saturn's orbit. However, recent research has cast doubt on the idea that Godzilla is a single star.

== Hotel ==
J.W. Marriott opened on April 24, 2015, in the Shinjuku district of Tokyo a 30-storey Hotel Gracery. The hotel is in the background of a massive kaiju statue. The structure of the hotel was built by Shinjuku Toho Kaikan theater in Kabuki. The Mayor of Tokyo District Shinjuku Kenichi Yoshizumi awarded an actor in a Godzilla suit special resident and tourism ambassador status, presenting a residency certificate to Toho executive Minami Ichikawa on behalf of Godzilla.

== Theme park attractions ==
From 1994 to 1998, Sanrio Puroland featured the 3D motion simulator film Monster Planet of Godzilla, which featured Godzilla, Mothra and Rodan and utilized their Heisei-era suits and puppets.

On October 10, 2020, an attraction called Godzilla Interception Operation Awaji opened in Nijigen no Mori theme park on Awaji Island in Hyōgo Prefecture, Japan. It features a theater with an exclusive short film, a zipline that leads guests into the mouth of a huge Godzilla statue, a shooting game and the Godzilla Museum.

As part of Seibu-en's 2021 overhaul, a Godzilla motion simulator opened at the park titled Godzilla the Ride: Giant Monsters Ultimate Battle. Directed by Takashi Yamazaki, the attraction puts guests in the middle of a battle between Godzilla, Rodan and King Ghidorah, with Godzilla's design bearing a close resemblance to the one that would appear in the 2023 film Godzilla Minus One.

== Promotional use ==
In 1992, a Nike commercial aired featuring Godzilla and Charles Barkley going head to head, playing basketball in a cityscape. Charles Barkley gave Godzilla an elbow to the face on the way to a slam dunk after the latter tried to slap the ball away from Barkley using his tail. The advertisement received positive reception and inspired a brief T-shirt line, a series of wall posters and its own comic book version from Dark Horse Comics.

In March 2026, Godzilla entered Formula One after Toho and Haas F1 Team signing a season-long collaboration deal which includes Haas racing a Godzilla-themed livery for the Japanese and United States Grands Prix.

=== Lawsuits associated with usage ===
Pharoahe Monch released his first single in 1999 called "Simon Says". The song became a major hit; however, he was later sued for the use of a Godzilla sample for the beat and forced to remove the song from the album as a result.

In 2002, Toho Studios sued Rugrats creators Arlene Klasky and Gábor Csupó over Reptar's similarities to Godzilla. This lawsuit resulted in Reptar making less appearances in subsequent Rugrats episodes.

In 2010 the Sea Shepherd Conservation Society named their most recently acquired scout vessel MV Gojira. In May 2011, the Sea Shepherd Conservation Society was served with a notice from the copyright holders of the Godzilla franchise, regarding the unauthorized use of the trademark. The Society promptly changed the vessel's name to the MV Brigitte Bardot in honor of the French fashion model, actress, and singer whom Paul Watson, the founder of Sea Shepherd, took on an anti-sealing trip in 1977.

A Seattle video game retailer was founded as Pink Godzilla Games and was known by that name for many years, until Toho, owner of the Godzilla franchise, claimed that the store was infringing upon its trademark. Pink Godzilla announced in 2009 that it would change its name to Pink Gorilla, rather than engage in a legal fight.

Voltage Pictures were sued by Toho in 2015 for unauthorized usage of Godzilla's image and stills from Godzilla films in emails and press documents sent to potential investors for the upcoming film Colossal. A settlement between Toho and Voltage Pictures was reached that October.

== Reception ==
The character Godzilla has received acclaim and is one of the most recognizable symbols of Japanese popular culture worldwide. Audiences respond positively to the character because he acts out of rage and self-preservation and shows where science and technology can go wrong.

As the series progressed, so did Godzilla, changing into a less destructive and more heroic character. Ghidorah (1964) was the turning point in Godzilla's transformation from villain to hero, by pitting him against a greater threat to humanity, King Ghidorah. Godzilla has since been viewed as an anti-hero. Roger Ebert cites Godzilla as a notable example of a villain-turned-hero, along with King Kong, Jaws (James Bond), the Terminator, and Rambo.

Godzilla is considered "the original radioactive superhero" due to his accidental radioactive origin story predating Spider-Man (1962 debut), though Godzilla did not become a hero until Ghidorah in 1964. By the 1970s, Godzilla came to be viewed as a superhero, with the magazine King of the Monsters in 1977 describing Godzilla as "Superhero of the '70s." Godzilla had surpassed Superman and Batman to become "the most universally popular superhero of 1977" according to Donald F. Glut. Godzilla was also voted the most popular movie monster in The Monster Times poll in 1973, beating Count Dracula, King Kong, Wolf Man, The Mummy, Creature From the Black Lagoon, and Frankenstein's monster. In 1977, a survey in Los Angeles found that 80% of boys aged between four and nine years old were Godzilla fans.

Godzilla was awarded a Lifetime Achievement Award at the 1996 MTV Movie Awards. He is one of only three fictional characters to date ever granted the award. He also received a star on the Hollywood Walk of Fame in 2004. 20 years later it was now awarded an Academy Award for Best Visual Effects in the 96th Academy Awards for Godzilla Minus One.
