= Larg =

Larg may refer to:

- Larg Hill, a hill in the Minnigaff Hills, a sub-range of the Galloway Hills range, part of the Southern Uplands of Scotland
- Large (surname)
- Mokona Modoki, a fictional character in xxxHolic and Tsubasa: Reservoir Chronicle

== See also ==
- Large (disambiguation)
