= Lurgy =

Lurgy may refer to:

- Lurgy or dreaded lurgi, a fictional disease invented on The Goon Show
  - since used as slang for illness in British English
- "The Lurgy", 2018 episode of The Dumping Ground series 6
- Lurgy (river), County Donegal, Ireland; a river
- Lurgy, County Tyrone, Ireland; a townland, see List of townlands of County Tyrone

== See also ==
- Lurge (surname)
- "Lurgee", a 1993 song by Radiohead off the album Pablo Honey
- Lurgi (disambiguation)
