= Humungous =

== See also ==
- Humongous Entertainment
- Humongous Fungus (disambiguation)
