= Fungus Among Us =

Fungus Among Us or Fungus Amongus, or Fungus Amungus may refer to:

== Music ==
- Fungus Amongus, a 1995 album by American rock band Incubus
- HumungousFungusAmongus, a 1986 album by hardcore punk band Adrenalin O.D.
- "A Fungus Amungus", a song by Mary Lou Williams, on her 1964 album Mary Lou Williams, alternatively titled Black Christ of the Andes

== Radio ==
- "Fungus Amungus", a Radiolab episode

== Television ==
- "Fungus Among Us" (Spongebob Squarepants), a 2007 TV episode
- "Fungus Among Us" (Milo Murphy's Law), a 2017 TV episode
- "Fungus Amongus" (Darkwing Duck), a 1991 TV episode
- "Fungus Amungus", the pilot of Groundling Marsh
- Fungus Among Us (pilot), an animated short featured on Cartoon Network
