= Lurgi =

Lurgi can refer to:

- Lurgi AG (formerly, Metallurgische Gesellschaft), a German chemical and construction company that was bought by Air Liquide
- Lurgi–Ruhrgas process for making gas from carbonaceous fuel under high pressure
- Lurgi generator - a device used to produce gas from coal (see Gasification)
- the dreaded lurgi, a fictional disease invented on The Goon Show
  - since used as slang for illness in British English

== See also ==
- Lurge (surname)
- "Lurgee", a 1993 song by Radiohead off the album Pablo Honey
- Lurgy
