= Humongous =

Humongous means enormous, of monstruous big size.

Humongous may also refer to:

- Humongous (film), a 1982 horror film
- Humongous Entertainment, American video game developer
- Lord Humongous, professional wrestling character who was introduced in Memphis' Mid-South Wrestling

== See also ==
- Humongous Fungus (disambiguation), colloquial names given to large colonies of mushrooms
- Big (disambiguation)
- Giant (disambiguation)
- Large (disambiguation)
