= Cruising with Elvis in Bigfoot's UFO =

Cruising With Elvis in Bigfoot's UFO

Studio album by Adrenalin O.D.
- Released: 1988
- Recorded: November 1987 at The House of Music, West Orange, N.J.
- Genre: Hardcore punk, punk rock
- Label: Buy Our Records
- Producer: Daniel Rey

Adrenalin O.D. chronology
Humungous; FungusAmongus (1986)	Cruising With Elvis in Bigfoot's UFO (1988)	Ishtar (1990)

Professional ratings
Review scores
Source	Rating
AllMusic	4/5 stars
The Encyclopedia of Popular Music	3/5 stars
Punknews.org	4.5/5 stars

Cruising With Elvis in Bigfoot's UFO is the third album by hardcore punk band Adrenalin O.D. It was released in 1988 through Buy Our Records. Although the band still retained the hardcore sound and sense of humor featured on the previous two records, the record contains songs exploring a more melodic style and is less focused on speed.

== Critical reception ==
AllMusic wrote that "A.O.D. are to punk what the Coasters were to late-'50s R&B; if you can't laugh at this and play it for all your drunken cronies, you must be more of an old stoneface than Mt. Rushmore." Trouser Press wrote: "Well-played and almost tuneful, the post-hardcore Cruisin’ With Elvis contains [songs] that thunder along with concise energy and the group’s typical whimsy."

== Track listing ==
No.	Title	Lyrics/Music	Length
1.	"If This Is Tuesday.....It Must Be Walla-Walla"	Richard
2.	"Bulimic Food Fight"	Richard/Wingate
3.	"Swindle"	Wingate
4.	"Stew"	Wingate
5.	"Second to None"	The Avengers
6.	"My Mother Can't Drive"	Wingate, Scott
7.	"Theme from an Imaginary Midget Western"	Scott, Richard
8.	"Something About.....Amy Carter"	Wingate
9.	"Flip Side Unclassified"	Wingate
10.	"Baby Elephant Walk"	Henry Mancini

== Personnel ==
- Paul Richard – Lead Vocals, Guitar
- Bruce Wingate – Guitar
- Keith Hartel – Bass
- Dave Scott – Drums

Production

- Producer – Daniel Rey
- Engineer – Mike Weisinger
- Cover Artwork – Susan Vezza
- Cover Coordination – Janet Fredericks
- Photography – Ron Akiyama
- Mastered By – Chris Gehringer
