= Humongous Fungus =

Humongous Fungus (a colloquial name given to large mushrooms) may refer to:

- An Armillaria ostoyae specimen in Malheur National Forest in Oregon, covering 3.4 square miles (8.8 km^{2})
- An Armillaria gallica specimen in Michigan, covering 37 acres (0.058 mi^{2}; 0.15 km^{2})

== See also ==
- HumungousFungusAmongus, an album released by American hardcore punk band Adrenalin O.D.
