= The Dumping Ground series 5 =

The Dumping Ground
- Series 5
- Series Five Title Card
- Starring: Connor Byrne; Miles Butler-Hughton; Kia Pegg; Sarah Rayson; Reece Buttery; Stacy Liu; Kasey McKellar; Akuc Bol; Lewis Hamilton; Nelly Currant; Gwen Currant; Ruben Reuter; Annabelle Davis; Hannah Moncur; Yousef Naseer; Jethro Baliba; Alexander Aze; Carma Hylton; Connor Lawson; Jasmine Uson; Emily Burnett
- No. of episodes: 22

Release
- Original network: CBBC; CBBC HD
- Original release: 20 January – 15 December 2017

Series chronology
- ← Previous; Series 4 Next → Series 6

The fifth series of the British children's television series The Dumping Ground began broadcasting on 20 January 2017 on CBBC and ended on 15 December 2017. The series follows the lives of the children living in the fictional children's care home of Ashdene Ridge, nicknamed by them "The Dumping Ground". It consists of twenty-two, thirty-minute episodes, airing in two halves in January–March and October–December 2017. It is the thirteenth series in The Story of Tracy Beaker franchise.

== Cast ==
=== Main ===
- Connor Byrne as Mike Milligan
- Miles Butler-Hughton as Tyler Lewis
- Kia Pegg as Jody Jackson
- Sarah Rayson as Floss Guppy
- Stacy Liu as May-Li Wang
- Kasey McKellar as Bailey Wharton (episodes 1-2 only)
- Akuc Bol as Kazima Tako (episodes 1-12 only)
- Lewis Hamilton as Ryan Reeves
- Gwen Currant as Billie Trent (episodes 1-16 only)
- Nelly Currant as Toni Trent (episodes 1-16 only)
- Sage as Mischief (from episodes 1-2 only)
- Ruben Reuter as Finn McLaine
- Annabelle Davis as Sasha Bellman
- Alexander Aze as Dexter Bellman
- Hannah Moncur as Chloe Reeves
- Yousef Naseer as Joseph Stubbs
- Jethro Baliba as Archie Able
- Carma Hylton as Candi-Rose (from episode 4)
- Connor Lawson as Alex Walker (from episode 8)
- Jasmine Uson as Taz De Souza (from episode 14)
- Emily Burnett as Charlie Morris (from episode 17)

=== Guest ===
- Simon Ludders as Peter Umbleby
- Alison Pargeter as Janet Umbleby
- Jaimie Boubezari as Edward Umbleby
- Mark Homer as Kev
- Sandy Foster as Kelly Bellman
- Alfie Browne-Sykes as Roddy
- Nigel Planer as Professor Edwin von Trockelbomf III.
- Caitlan Barrett Ward as Sophie
- Andrew Hanratty as Adam
- Julia Haworth as Katherine
- Lawrence Neale as Steve
- Oliver Wellington as Sam
- Paul Barber as George
- Lucy Benjamin as Ms Bloomfield
- Mike Grady as Ralph
- Manpreet Bambra as Anjli
- Steffen Peddie as Manny
- Richard Pepple as Hakim Tako
- Stirling Gallacher as Mimi Blunt
- Samantha Morris as Sally Harper
- Phil Yarrow as Dom Harper
- Poppy Jhakra as Diane
- Dylan Barnes as Police Officer Sykes
- Bailey Hayden as Josh
- Joe Maw as Johnny Taylor
- Mia McKenna-Bruce as Tee Taylor
- Rayna Campbell as TV Journalist
- Jessica Revell as Elektra Perkins
- Christopher Slater as Frank Matthews
- Jason Craker as Jason

=== Casting ===
18-year-old Connor Lawson, 19-year-old Emily Burnett, 9-year-old Jasmine Uson and 12-year-old Carma Hylton were cast as Alex, Charlie, Taz and Candi-Rose respectively.

== Episodes ==
| No. overall | No. in series | Title | Directed by | Written by | Original release date | UK viewers (millions) |
|---|---|---|---|---|---|---|
Part 1
| 68 | 1 | "Miscreants, Robots and Bullies (Back in the Game - Part 1)" | Duncan Foster | Dawn Harrison | 20 January 2017 | 0.24 |
Bailey finds out Mo has gone to live with his grandfather and he finds Dexter in Mo's old room. Billie and Toni take a doll, Harriet, from next door, where people are moving in. The young people, Mike and May-Li are invited to meet their new neighbours, The Umbleby's. The young people are mistaken for Mike and May-Li's children, but they tell the Umbleby's they are a children's home. Floss tells Peter and Janet about the young people's lives and Mike stops their son, Edward, choking on a cherry stone and the Umbleby's tell them to leave. Sasha thinks Bailey is winding her up by playing football with Dexter. Everyone finds out the Umbleby's are holding a public meeting about Ashdene Ridge. Bailey discovers a former team mate, Roddy, Sasha and Dexter's stepbrother, will be coaching Dexter. Bailey and Roddy organise a football match and Mike joins the meeting at the Umbleby's. The young people decide to become the perfect neighbours, but when Kazima discovers Billie and Tony took Harriet, she and Toni return it and Edward helps them leave. Roddy gets Dexter to lie that a 17-year-old player is his age and they lose the match against Roddy's team. Kev, Sasha and Dexter's stepfather, talks to Bailey about taking up coaching and going to college in America. Bailey finds the Umbleby's house broken into and Dexter in the garage. Dexter confides in Bailey about Roddy threatens him if he doesn't do what he says. Archie and Joseph are caught in the Umbleby's garden, accused of intruding, but Edward admits who was responsible. Kazima, Billie and Toni are taken to the police by Mike, witnessed by Dexter and Bailey. Note: Alexander Aze as Dexter Bellman becomes main in this episode
| 69 | 2 | "Back in the Game (Back in the Game - Part 2)" | Duncan Foster | Dawn Harrison | 20 January 2017 | 0.24 |
Bailey stops Dexter from handing himself into the police and Kev takes Dexter home. Some of the young people decide to collect things for the Umbleby's to replace their stolen things, whilst some decide to stop the crime. Sasha finds texts from Dexter on Bailey's phone as they have planned a set up and she takes his phone. Roddy catches Dexter flattening the van's tyres and Roddy warns Bailey to back off. Bailey tells Sasha about the trouble Dexter has got into and they find Dexter and Roddy. Peter is unimpressed with the young people for getting them things as nothing had been taken, but Janet gives Mike the doll for Billie and Toni. Sasha finds out Sandy is involved in Roddy's plans and she takes Dexter with Bailey. Sasha calls the police and Kev offers Bailey a reference for a college in America in place of Roddy. Dexter is pleased to be placed under a voluntary care order and Mike persuades Bailey to go to America and Billie and Toni offer to sell the doll and give the money to Bailey so Mischief can go. Bailey leaves The Dumping Ground with Mischief. Last Appearances: Kasey McKellar as Bailey Wharton and Sage as Mischief
| 70 | 3 | "One Giant Leap" | Duncan Foster | Owen Lloyd-Fox | 27 January 2017 | 0.23 |
Ryan tells Joseph he can work out all the young people, apart from him and Joseph questions Ryan over everyone hating him and whether he minds. Mike and May-Li find out they could have another OFSTED inspection and Ryan overhears them say he is going. Ryan announces to the others that any one of them could be leaving. Joseph and Finn research Moon landings to find out if they were fake. Joseph and Finn try to ask Mike if they can go out, but leave without his permission. Ryan suggests to the young people that they decide who should leave. Joseph and Finn visit an observatory whilst Ryan tries to encourage people to vote his way. Joseph and Finn come across a professor, who allows them to use his telescope whilst he works on an equation. When it comes to voting, Chloe tells everyone that Ryan wants Joseph out and also reveals that Ryan was the one responsible for Mike being suspended. Ryan then turns the young people against each other with what they said. Joseph volunteers to leave The Dumping Ground, but the young people find out Ryan was selected to represent Ashdene Ridge at a theme park and Joseph is chosen to go instead. Everyone hates Ryan even more than before and Chloe tells him that while she is his sister, they cannot be friends as she does not trust him.
| 71 | 4 | "The Fairytale Princess" | Duncan Foster | Owen Lloyd-Fox and Jessica Lea | 3 February 2017 | 0.21 |
Ryan takes Chloe shopping where she meets a girl named Candi-Rose. Chloe and Candi-Rose ditch Ryan and back at The Dumping Ground, Edward crashes his drone into Kazima's cake and Edward has to help Kazima bake another one. Chloe pretends she attends boarding school, like Candi-Rose. Mike and May-Li contact the police when Ryan reveals Chloe is missing and when she returns, she tells them about her new friend. Kazima decides to help Edward stand up to his father and when Chloe is out with Candi-Rose, the young people notice her from the minibus and Chloe denies knowing them. Mr Umbleby is annoyed with Edward spending time with Kazima and playing his guitar. May-Li introduces Candi-Rose to the young people and both she and Chloe are shocked and hurt by the lies that they told. Chloe admits to May-Li she doesn't like herself, but later joins Candi-Rose's karaoke. Kazima offers Edward's parents to stay away from him and Edward gets his guitar back. First Appearance: Carma Hylton as Candi-Rose Note Candi Rose’s name is Courtney but she had to be called Candi Rose for reasons
| 72 | 5 | "Sittin' in a Tree" | Delyth Thomas | Sarah-Louise Hawkins | 10 February 2017 | 0.27 |
Jody and Tyler are surprised the young people see them as a couple, so to put an end to it, Jody claims Tyler has a girlfriend he is taking to a kids in care forum dinner. Archie injures himself during a game of football and May-Li helps him. Jody and Tyler decide to ask a girl from the skate park to be his girlfriend. At the skate park, Tyler attempts to ask Sophie to the dinner. Archie shows May-Li plans for the garden and is slightly jealous at Toni's involvement. Candi-Rose shows Tyler how to get Sophie's attention and after talking to her, Tyler gets Sophie's number and Jody later smudges the number. After taking a magazine quiz, Candi-Rose realises the quiz concluded Tyler is perfect for her. Jody tries to convince Sophie to give Tyler a chance, but she decides things won't work. Ryan sensitively talks to Archie about May-Li, thinking he's confusing her as his mum, but Archie insists he doesn't feel that way. Archie is hurt to learn May-Li went to the garden centre with Toni and in retaliation, he trashes the garden, which is initially blamed on Ryan. Archie opens up to May-Li and that he wanted to feel special and is reassured that he is, whilst Ryan reasures him that attachment to careworkers is common and a phase. Jody and Tyler admit their friendship is important and they don't want it to change.
| 73 | 6 | "Faking It" | Delyth Thomas | Matt Evans | 17 February 2017 | 0.17 |
On Billie and Toni's birthday, they receive £20 each off Mike and May-Li and they choose Floss and Candi-Rose to go out with. Using a coin, they plan to go shopping. The other young people go to Mike, wanting money to do what they want and Mike agrees to give them £50, on the condition they pitch a business and make £100. At the shops, Floss is bored and tries to hurry them up. The young people split into teams for their business and decide Finn should be the one they pitch to. The girls come across an audition tent for a commercial, and Candi-Rose, Billie and Toni decide to audition, however, Floss is picked for the part. Jody, Tyler and Ryan decide to do an adventure park in the garden and Candi-Rose does Floss' make up. The young people fail to impress Mike and Finn with their businesses, telling them they need more time to think. After speaking to Ryan about the audition, Candi-Rose stops Floss' clock, glues her shoes to the floor and takes her scrapbook on her mum, Katherine. At the commercial filming, Floss meets her screen mother and Finn gives £10 to a man whose car breaks down. Archie swaps Kazima, Sasha and Dexter's sugar for salt and Floss asks May-Li how she can play a daughter without never having a mother, but Katherine encourages Floss. Floss is nasty to Candi-Rose when she finds out she was responsible for gluing her shoes, but gets her into the commercial and Katherine gives Floss a bracelet. Later, Floss tells Mike and May-Li that she knows her mum isn't coming back and wants to be adopted. Steve, the man who Finn helped, gives him £100.
| 74 | 7 | "Sasha Bellman P.I." | Delyth Thomas | Jeff Povey | 24 February 2017 | 0.20 |
Tyler brings in a parcel for Archie and he and Sasha find it has been stolen from the office. Tyler gets Toni to keep Archie away, inviting him on a trip with her and Billie. The young people are gathered together and Sasha and Tyler inform them about the parcel theft and Jody suspects Dexter as the culprit. Dexter insists he is innocent and allows them to search his room. Archie sings along to a song and the twins discover it's an old song and they believe Archie is ageing backwards. The young people go through their movements in the 9 minutes the parcel theft occurred and Mike asks them if the parcel arrived. Sasha suggests an amnesty, but it fails when they hear the office door click shut and Floss is hiding in the office to catch the culprit. Archie tells the twins about the things he thinks he's done and Sasha follows a trail of sherbert to the bathroom. She figures out Dexter was responsible and he admits it. Archie, Billie and Toni devise a list of things for Archie to do before he disappears. Sasha is forced into Jody's room when she hears Mike and when Jody finds the package, she is caught by Ryan, but Tyler decides to take the blame. Sasha wants Dexter to confess what he did after overhearing Tyler, but when Tyler owns up to taking it, all the other young people insist they took it. Mike gives Archie the package, which are gifts from his father, explaining why Archie and twins believed he was ageing backwards. Sasha warns Dexter he can't do what he did again.
| 75 | 8 | "Belief" | Delyth Thomas | Ian Kershaw | 3 March 2017 | 0.20 |
May-Li is going on holiday, so a temporary careworker is brought in, Sam. Floss falls down the steps and is taken to hospital. Kazima goes shopping in order to meet a homeless boy, Alex. When Floss returns, she convinces some of the young people she has magical powers by guessing correctly the cards Chloe has. Kazima tracks Alex down and he runs off with the food shopping. Floss thinks her powers are getting stronger and Toni finds out Floss cheated with the cards by using the mirror reflection. Floss takes a file on the young people for Sam and Sam sends Kazima to her room when he doesn't believe the shopping was stolen. Kazima and Tyler sneak out to find Alex, whilst Candi-Rose distracts Mike and Sam. They go to a building, where they find Alex squatting and an ill man, George. Toni realises Floss took Sam's file to convince the others she can mind read and Kazima sneaks Alex into The Dumping Ground. Floss struggles to convince the others she has powers when Ryan blocks the mirror and Toni takes the file. Alex reveals to Kazima and Tyler that he was put into care and Mike and Sam find out about Alex when Finn lets it slip. Floss admits she doesn't have powers and the young people are annoyed with Kazima when Alex takes their things. Kazima and Sam go to the squat to find Alex and retrieve the young people's things. Mike gives Sam a warning. First Appearance: Connor Lawson as Alex Walker Absent: Alexander Aze as Dexter Bellman
| 76 | 9 | "Vox Populi" | Jordan Hogg | Gareth Sergeant | 10 March 2017 | 0.19 |
Tyler runs into a woman on his way to work experience as a journalist, who happens to be Tyler's boss. Tyler's boss, Ms Bloomfield, sends Tyler out to investigate an incident by the river. Ryan and Dexter spot Peter Umbleby in the park, who has put a notice up about a public meeting to close the skate park and Tyler meets a man, Ralph. Chloe suggests they go to the meeting about the skate park and the young people want Chloe as their spokesperson and she agrees. Tyler meets Ralph again at his house, who is the one who phoned about the incident and Ralph explains to Tyler that developers want him to sell his house and shows him the vandalism in his garden. Tyler shows Jody what the developers want to build and Chloe decides she doesn't want to be a spokesperson when the young people are unconvinced with what she'll say. Tyler discovers the radio station he is doing work experience is sponsored by the developers, the reason they won't look into Ralph's story and Ms Bloomfield warns Tyler to drop the matter with Ralph. The young people apologise to Chloe and Chloe admits she is scared of letting them down, but she chooses to be the spokesperson again. Tyler meets with Ralph again and Ms Bloomfield talks with Mike and she shows Tyler what Ralph is being offered. At the meeting, Mr Umbleby undermines the young people and the other young people start hitting pots and pans. Tyler sees Ralph and Ralph explains he can't leave his home due to the memories he has had with his late wife. Chloe gets the young people to stop with the pots and pans and Chloe explains what the skate park means to them and Ms Bloomfield invites Tyler to be a guest on the radio the following day to talk about his work experience. Absent: Stacey Liu as May-Li Wang and Akuc Bol as Kazima Tako
| 77 | 10 | "Free" | Jordan Hogg | Ian Kershaw | 17 March 2017 | 0.21 |
Kazima prepares for a college meeting, hoping to do engineering, but Alex turns up. Kazima threatens to phone the police, but he tells her that George is in a bad way. The other young people, Mike and Sam go to a farm and both Dexter and Sam are attracted to farm employee, Anjli. Alex brings George to The Dumping Ground and lets her and Tyler know they've been thrown out of their squat and Alex blames Kazima, but he later apologises. Candi-Rose screams when her mascara runs on the tractor ride, scaring the animals whilst some of the others have to muck out. Alex and George refuse to leave from the attic, as they have nowhere to go and promised to stay together. Candi-Rose takes a liking to the baby sheep and May-Li returns to The Dumping Ground from her holiday. May-Li decides to stay with Kazima and Tyler and Candi-Rose asks Ryan on his opinion on whether the animals are happy, but he reckons they're not. Kazima sneaks Alex out of The Dumping Ground to get George some medicine. Kazima thinks George and Alex's pact to stay together is preventing George from getting well and Alex getting proper care and George reveals to Kazima he was brought up in care. May-Li is suspicious of what's going on, but Kazima refuses to tell her and May-Li decides to trust her. The animals are let out and Sam helps Anjli round them up and Dexter helps get the bull into his enclosure and Mike and Anjli find Candi-Rose with a sheep and she gives him back when they reassure her he is looked after. When George disappears, Alex, Kazima, Tyler and May-Li find him, but George orders Alex to leave him alone and he tells Kazima he did it for Alex. Anjli invites Candi-Rose back to the farm to help out. The young people return home and are not pleased with Alex being there and that children's services have given him permission to stay, but Kazima persuades them to give him a chance. Candi-Rose decides to become vegetarian and Kazima considers a career in the caring profession. Absent: Kia Pegg as Jody Jackson
| 78 | 11 | "The Wardrobe" | Jordan Hogg | Jeff Povey | 24 March 2017 | 0.16 |
Kazima, Ryan and Joseph remain at The Dumping Ground on their own whilst the other young people out with Mike. Before May-Li arrives, Kazima, Ryan and Joseph have to move Kazima's wardrobe, which is being picked up by a friend of Mike's relative, Manny, for another wardrobe, which Mike says is cursed. Ryan refuses to help Kazima, so Kazima takes a medal belonging to Ryan's grandfather until he helps. The new wardrobe arrives and they are shocked with the size and they struggle to get it inside. Kazima and Ryan disagree with the wardrobe being cursed, but Joseph gets stuck in the wardrobe. When Kazima and Ryan find things to help get Joseph out, Manny arrives and takes the new wardrobe, so Kazima and Ryan try and find him. Joseph tries to give them clues to where he is on the phone whilst Manny decides to sell the wardrobe instead of giving it to charity. Joseph tells Kazima and Ryan he's at the docks and his phone dies. The wardrobe is put into a storage container and Joseph uses Ryan's medal as a screwdriver. Kazima and Ryan reach the docks and find Manny and they realise Manny didn't hear Joseph shouting as he wore headphones. Kazima and Ryan find the boat has gone and as they leave, Ryan spots his medal and Joseph appears, explaining that he escaped through the back. Absent: Kia Pegg as Jody Jackson, Connor Lawson as Alex Walker and Jethro Baliba as Archie Able
| 79 | 12 | "Farvel" | Jordan Hogg | Ian Kershaw | 31 March 2017 | 0.16 |
Kazima checks her online appeal she set up to find her father and brother and she receives a message from someone claiming to know the whereabouts of her father. Alex is upset at the realisation that Kazima would leave if she found her family whilst Floss is pleased she has nits, so May-Li applies nit shampoo. Kazima tells Alex it won't harm to open up to people and Kazima is emotional when she receives a video call from her father, who is now living in Denmark and wants Kazima to join him. Kazima's announcement that she is leaving the following day upsets the other young people, but Tyler persuades them to be happy for Kazima and that they should throw her a party. Kazima's clothes are thrown out of the window by Alex, but Kazima reminds everyone that Alex needs care and Alex tells her that everyone he trusts always leaves him. Kazima introduces Alex to her father by video call and Kazima gives him her necklace. At her party, Kazima gives the young people a present and card and tells them that she will miss them. The young people have to have another lot of nit shampoo on and they think Alex has nits and Candi-Rose tells them she thinks he stole Kazima's necklace, not knowing she gave it to him. On her last day, Kazima says goodbye to the young people and May-Li drives her to the airport. Alex trashes the mural with paint and Tyler tells them that he didn't steal Kazima's necklace and Tyler tells the young people that they are a family. May-Li realises she passed on headlice, catching it from her own children and Alex reads his letter from Kazima. Kazima arrives in Denmark and is reunited with her father and brother Amir. Final Appearance: Akuc Bol as Kazima Tako
Part 2
| 80 | 13 | "Choose Your Own Adventure" | David Innes Edwards | Owen Lloyd-Fox | 13 October 2017 | 0.25 |
Mike finds all the young people on their technology and forces them to hand over their electronics. Ryan tells Alex that he should run away, but refuses to give in to Alex's demand of money and his phone, but tells him he can get all sorts of gadgets. May-Li gives Floss a book from her childhood and after reading it, Floss suggests to the young people they should go an adventure. Floss is annoyed that Mike has followed them and the young people soon decide to leave. Floss finds a tunnel in the garden and Alex is caught in the drawers, where the young people's electronics and Alex tells Mike that Ryan set him up and threatens to leave. Floss gets locked in the tunnel and uses a radio to communicate. Alex hangs up on Mike's phone call, thinking of leaving, but returns home. Alex gets Floss out of the tunnel. Mike gives the young people their technology back, who tell Mike that they have declared Tuesday's as technology free and Mike tells Alex that despite Ryan not admitting to setting him up, he believes Alex. Floss wants to be best friends with Alex and gives him Jeff.
| 81 | 14 | "Making Waves" | David Innes Edwards | Ella Greenhill | 20 October 2017 | 0.19 |
Some of the young people are going out to the beach whilst some are remaining behind for the new girl Taz, with Jody selected to look after her. May-Li convinces Taz to go inside. At the beach, Finn, Dexter, Archie and Joseph are taken in by a legend story. Mike assigns the young people at the beach some different activities and Floss watches Taz unpack in her room as they are sharing. Taz knocks over some snacks when she overhears Jody complain about her to May-Li and Taz throws mud over Jody. Jody covers tape over the cold tap and Taz trashes Sasha's room. At the beach, Finn, Dexter, Archie and Joseph find a message in the bottle and want to find the missing gold. Taz doesn't want to share with Floss, demanding Jody's room. Jody reminisces about her first day and how Tracy made it fun. Tyler tells Ryan that his behaviour is horrible towards the others and Candi-Rose questions how Sasha behaves. Sasha destroys her and Candi-Rose's sculpture when he makes remarks about how Candi-Rose makes Sasha softer and Candi-Rose runs off when Sasha insults her. The boys discover something buried in the sand and Jody offers to give her room up for Taz until she settles in before showing her the assault course she did for her. The boys find a chest of gold coins and Taz decides to share with Floss. First Appearance: Jasmine Uson as Taz De Souza
| 82 | 15 | "The Phantom of Ashdene Ridge" | David Innes Edwards | Vincent Lund & Matthew Cooke | 27 October 2017 | 0.24 |
On Halloween, the young people are introduced to the new night manager, Mimi Blunt. Some of the young people opt out of going to a Halloween show. Mimi demands that Alex empties the vacuum after he refuses to her request and she assigns other chores to the young people. Tyler finds an old journal behind the skirting board in the kitchen and shares the content of the journal with the others, realising it was written by a young person in care in the 1980s that mentions a ghost and has missing pages. Mimi confiscates the journal and Tyler suggests the young people do a ghost hunt. Tyler and Joseph hunt for clues in the attic and with Alex, they find an entrance to another attic. Mimi catches Chloe and Candi-Rose looking for the journal in the office, but they manage to talk their way out of trouble and Candi-Rose is freaked out when she thinks she hears a ghost. Chloe and Candi-Rose get the journal and Tyler and Alex are scared when a mysterious figure chases after them. Chloe and Candi-Rose end up trapped in Chloe's bedroom whilst Tyler and Alex hide in the bathroom. Candi-Rose opens up about her sister to Chloe and when Mimi gets the young people together, Chloe accuses Mimi of being behind everything as she tried to distract them and wanted all the young people out of the house. Tyler recognises Mimi's locket and the young people establish a connection between a picture from the secret attic and the ghost. The young people lock Mimi into a bedroom and find lamps in the attic that affects the moonlight, which leads them to finding a painting. They are chased by the mysterious figure and unmask it, who is a woman and they tell Mimi they know she is a former young person named Kerren who tried to figure out the clues when she was a resident and found out about the painting's worth. The mysterious figure woman is revealed to be Kerren's sister and Mimi unintentionally destroys the painting.
| 83 | 16 | "The Switch" | David Innes Edwards | Sarah-Louise Hawkins | 3 November 2017 | 0.23 |
Billie and Toni spend time with potential adoptive parents, Sally and Dom Harper, at The Dumping Ground and at their house. An electrician is needed to fix wires in Jody's room, so she has to share with Sasha, which doesn't impress either of them. When Billie and Toni return, Floss plants the doubt that Toni isn't keen on the adoption and Floss tells Billie that she has to make sure that Toni doesn't change her mind. Sasha is annoyed with Jody's snoring and records it, but in the morning, pours water over her. Billie and Floss try to convince Toni that living with many other people is annoying. Sasha threatens to play the recording when Jody messes Sasha's things and refuses to tidy up. Toni announces to Billie that she doesn't want to be fostered and Jody hides Sasha's jacket when Sasha refuses to delete the recording until Jody leaves her room. Billie and Floss lock Toni in the shed and Billie pretends to be herself and Toni to the social worker. Dexter and Archie let Toni out of the shed and the social worker realises what Billie has done and Billie and Toni are both annoyed with each other. Toni refuses to talk to Billie and May-Li loses patience with Jody and Sasha's constant arguing. Floss tells Toni that despite having a mother, she would like a family and Jody and Sasha apologise to one another. When the Harper's visit so Billie can talk to them, Toni decides she wants to live with the Harper's and they move in with the Harper's. Final Appearances: Gwen Currant as Billie Trent and Nelly Currant as Toni Trent
| 84 | 17 | "Mission Totally Possible" | Simon Massey | Keith Brumpton | 10 November 2017 | — |
The young people try to fool Mike that Ashdene Ridge has been sold and bought by a property developer, with Jody filming it. When Mike finds out it is a prank, he confiscates Jody's phone and he is challenged to pull a prank. Jody almost gets her phone back from the safe, but Mike catches her and May-Li brings new girl Charlie to The Dumping Ground, who wants to set up equipment to look at wildlife. Mike decides to upgrade the security and Gary Bradford from the security firm arrives to install a new safe. To retrieve her phone, Jody gets all the young people in to help her and Ryan decides to help them, but tells them they need Gary's help. Sasha convinces Gary to help them with the new security and after Gary helps them disable the cameras and alarms. When they open the safe, May-Li arrives with a police officer to arrest Gary, stating he is responsible for robberies and Gary turns out to be Mike in disguise. Mike explains how he did his plan and Charlie returns Jody's phone, which was hidden in the shed by Mike. First Appearances: Emily Burnett as Charlie Morris
| 85 | 18 | "Sick" | Simon Massey | Kim Millar | 17 November 2017 | 0.24 |
Sasha gets locked in the bathroom when the handle comes off and the young people notice that Floss smells. Apprentice Josh gets Sasha out and Floss has a spot on her nose. Josh takes a liking to her and he invites Sasha to a gig whilst Floss uses spot cream, but asks her to a warehouse to see some art. Joseph tells Dexter and Archie that puberty and hormones are the reason Floss and Sasha are being the way they are. Dexter is hurt when Sasha cannot help with his homework, choosing Josh over him. When Sasha returns home, Mike reprimands her for not having his permission to go out and when Mike refuses to let Sasha go out again with Josh, she argues that she has permission from her mum and social worker. Josh tells Sasha that he got turned down from an art course and Floss sprays herself with deodorant. Mike invites Josh to stay for dinner and questions him about his education and social life and Dexter does a lie detector test on Josh. Mike gives his consent to Sasha to go to the gig and Sasha dispels Dexter's doubts that she will leave him. Jody and Charlie confront Floss over taking their deodorant and spot cream, but May-Li asks them to take it easy as Floss is going through puberty. Sasha is upset when Josh fails to show up at the gig. When May-Li finds Floss meditating in her room, May-Li talks to Floss about her body changing and to come to her. Josh apologises to Sasha for missing the gig, but he was offered a place at college and Jody and Charlie give Floss a teenage survival kit.
| 86 | 19 | "Rough Justice" | Simon Massey | Matt Evans | 24 November 2017 | 0.18 |
The young people set up a kangaroo court after money is stolen and Jody and Joseph are the prime suspects. Alex sorts through things from his mum. When Mike takes the stand, he explains the money stolen was raised from a jumble sale organised by Joseph for a trip to the planetarium and during the jumble sale, Finn breaks an ornament. Floss, who is acting as defence for the prosecution, accuses Mike of eating a packet of doughnuts. Finn asks Alex along to the library with him. Archie tells Sasha, who is defending Jody and Joseph, that he and Joseph were working on making the solar system, but Floss presents images of Joseph and Archie in the garden trying solar powersl. When Candi-Rose is questioned, the young people are furious that she kept her make up instead of selling it at the jumble sale. Finn takes Alex to the park and they talk about Alex's mum and Alex disagrees with Finn that his mum may be sorry. When Floss shows Joseph his technology catalogue with a £25 item marked, Floss accuses Joseph of having the opportunity to steal when he was in the garden. When Floss presents a letter from Jody's brother Kingsley, Jody reveals that he wrote for money, giving her motive to steal. Alex retells the day he was abandoned by his mum outside his dad's work. The young people who are acting as a jury deliberate who took the money and Ryan is determined to convince them Jody and Joseph are guilty. When the jury are about to give their verdict, Joseph tells them that Floss told her to blame Jody. When Finn returns back, Mike finds a note on him saying that he owes £25, which he used to replace Alex's ornament. Jody and Joseph were free to go and everyone went to the planetarium, expect Floss, who was grounded after cheating in the court.
| 87 | 20 | "Where You Belong" | Simon Massey | Furquan Akhtar | 1 December 2017 | 0.23 |
Dexter is overseeing some of the young people cleaning the minibus. May-Li is annoyed with the mess and is further annoyed when she is soaked by the young people and Mike playing with water guns and buckets of water. Mike tells off Jody, Ryan, Sasha and Alex when they cause mess and Ryan suggests they use Mike and May-Li arguing to their advantage. The young people complain about Dexter bossing them about and being selfish and Charlie joins Floss, Finn and Archie with a game of badminton. Dexter annoys Floss and Candi-Rose by taking the tablet why they are using it and Dexter decides he wants to get his own. Whilst Mike is doing May-Li's appraisal, May-Li complains about the young people's behaviour and out of frustration, Mike notes down May-Li's worst qualities. Ryan reads what Mike has written and shares it with Jody and Sasha, which May-Li overhears and May-Li is hurt. Dexter is fired by the young people and Ryan owns up to what he said to Jody and Sasha. The young people make a meal for Mike and May-Li to talk and when May-Li doesn't believe things are progressing, Mike asks if she is quitting and May-Li furiously agrees to quit. When the others find out, Charlie tells May-Li that she and Mike are the closest they all have to a mum and dad and the young people tell May-Li they don't want her to go. May-Li takes back what she said and explains that she and Mike lost their tempers. Mike shows May-Li his positive appraisal and May-Li joins in in a water fight.
| 88 | 21 | "#SaveTheDG" | Steve Brett | Dawn Harrison | 8 December 2017 | 0.23 |
Mike comes across a letter from a development firm in the garden and everyone is horrified to learn that they are planning to knock The Dumping Ground down and build flats. When Mike is told they received a written notice, Taz reveals she hid the post. After a visit to the council, Mike and Tyler tell everyone the decision was taken to close The Dumping Ground was down to money. Candi-Rose frets to May-Li about her needs in another placement and wants to be with Chloe. May-Li tells Mike there was a meeting about the development, which she thought was for care leavers. Sasha posts a vlog whilst the others go through contacting old residents, Joseph does things online and Tyler does the PR. Charlie explains where the young people would go if The Dumping Ground was shut and Candi-Rose encourages Chloe to write a letter to her social worker to make sure they stay together. When there's a visit by the mayor, Ryan borrows Mike's MBE to help keep The Dumping Ground open, but Alex eggs the Mayor and Peter and the pair of them are returned to Mike after being told they could have been charged with public disorder. The Dumping Ground appears on the news and Mike is horrified that Peter is head of building planning and Janet exaggerates the young people's behaviour. Everyone's delighted when Tee and Johnny visit to help save The Dumping Ground and they suggest spreading it online, but Joseph suggests crowdfunding to buy The Dumping Ground. Chloe decides she should go to London to see the royal family and the young people decide to sacrifice their Christmas money. Tyler finds out from Peter that contracts are being signed in a week whilst the young people talk Mike and May-Li through their crowdfunding idea. Mike's MBE goes missing, as does the money and Mike proceeds to searching the young people's bedrooms whilst the young people put up Christmas decorations. Candi-Rose is revealed to be the one to have taken the MBE, admitting that she took it because she fears being separated from Chloe and Mike reports the money missing to the police. Alex is taken to the station by the police after matching a description of someone breaking in and Peter reveals that the sale has been brought forward to the following day due to the management of The Dumping Ground. Tee texts Elektra telling her to go to Plan B, who leaves a garage on her motorbike. Guest Appearances: Mia McKenna Bruce as Tee Taylor, Joe Maw as Johnny Taylor and Jessica Revell as Elektra Perkins.
| 89 | 22 | "What Lies Beneath" | Steve Brett | Dawn Harrison | 15 December 2017 | 0.25 |
Elektra returns to The Dumping Ground and greets everyone before sarcastically insulting the Umblebys. The Umblebys receive an email about the sale being put on hold due to the reports of Roman remains on the site, which the young people, Mike and May-Li are delighted about. Peter comes across Frank at the council whilst trying to find the boss, but Frank tells him his boss is away and is working on the site report. Elektra emerges when Peter leaves, impressed with how things are going. Alex overhears Peter and Janet discussing their own hired archaeological expert, who he will bribe with money to get his own way. Tyler, Jody and Alex find Frank in the garden taking photos and realises that everything about the Roman remains is a scam and Elektra is in on it. The young people decide to buy Roman coins to fake Roman remains and Floss talks to Janet, who confides in Floss that Edward was forced to go to music college by Peter. At the museum, Jody stops Alex from stealing a Roman artefact. When the TV journalist arrives to film the news on the Roman remains, she exposes it as a con when she finds one of the coins that is professionally cleaned. May-Li tells Chloe and Candi-Rose they cannot be placed together as the placement suitable for Chloe and Ryan is where Candi-Rose used to live. Finn doesn't want to be in a foster family and Floss wants Elektra to foster her, but May-Li insists Finn and Floss are going to live with foster families. Frank and Tyler look into Peter's plans and realise that Peter and Janet will gain a luxury house for the development. Mike cooks Christmas dinner for the young people and Mike tries to encourage happiness amongst the young people. Janet returns the stolen money to Tyler and the theft was arranged by Peter. Janet tells Tyler that she wants to remain where she is and Tyler gets Frank to search something. Mike tricks Peter inside and the young people tell him they know he is getting a new house. Peter gives in and the young people celebrate Christmas and Tee and Elektra realise that they always had family Christmases. Guest Appearances: Mia McKenna Bruce as Tee Taylor, Joe Maw as Johnny Taylor, Jessica Revell as Elektra Perkins and Christopher Slater as Frank Matthews. Last Appearance: Alexander Aze as Dexter Bellman
