= Large =

Large means of great size.

Large may also refer to:

== Mathematics ==
- Arbitrarily large, a phrase in mathematics
- Large cardinal, a property of certain transfinite numbers
- Large category, a category with a proper class of objects and morphisms (or both)
- Large diffeomorphism, a diffeomorphism that cannot be continuously connected to the identity diffeomorphism in mathematics and physics
- Large numbers, numbers significantly larger than those ordinarily used in everyday life
- Large ordinal, a type of number in set theory
- Large sieve, a method of analytic number theory
  - Larger sieve, a heightening of the large sieve
- Law of large numbers, a result in probability theory
- Sufficiently large, a phrase in mathematics

== Other uses ==
- Large (film), a 2001 comedy film
- Large (surname), an English surname
- LARGE, an enzyme
- Large, a British English name for the maxima (music), a note length in mensural notation
- Large, or G's, or grand, slang for $1,000 US dollars
- Large, a community in Jefferson Hills, Pennsylvania

== See also ==
- Big (disambiguation)
- Giant (disambiguation)
- Huge (disambiguation)
- Humongous (disambiguation)
- Macro (disambiguation)
- Size (disambiguation)
