= Pink Gorilla =

Video game retailer

Pink Gorilla LLC
- Type: Limited liability company
- Industry: Video game retail
- Founded: April 29, 2005; 21 years ago (as Pink Godzilla Games); July 8, 2009 (as Pink Gorilla)
- Headquarters: Seattle, Washington, U.S.
- Number of locations: 5
- Products: Retro and modern video games and consoles, imported video games, video game accessories, branded merchandise, imported plushies, gashapon
- Owner: Cody Spencer & Kelsey Lewin
- Website: pinkgorillagames.com

Pink Gorilla, LLC is a retro video game retailer with five locations in Seattle, Washington, Las Vegas, Nevada, and Tempe, Arizona. The store originally opened as Pink Godzilla Games until 2009 after being asked by Toho to remove 'Godzilla' from the name. The Seattle Post-Intelligencer considers it "Seattle's best" among such retailers.

== History ==
The store was founded as Pink Godzilla Games in 2005 and was known by that name for many years. Toho, owner of the Godzilla franchise, claimed the store was infringing upon its trademark. Pink Godzilla announced in 2009 that it would change its name. Rather than engage in a legal fight, the store decided to voluntarily rebrand.

The company's mascot is Pink Gojima, from the fictional Island of Go. It is also known as Pinky G or just Pinky. The mascot uses the colors of pink and green, which are also used to decorate the retail locations.

In 2018, Pink Gorilla was featured on IGN as one of the Top 5 Essential Spots to Visit In Seattle for Nerds.

== Products ==
The store offers a number of other non-game gaming products, including imported Japanese plush toys, key chains, magazines, strategy guides, accessories, trading cards, and small toys from gashapon machines.

The store also offers merchandise such as toys and Pink Gorilla-branded T-shirts, hats, beanies, and stuffed pink gorillas fashioned after the store mascot Pinky G. As a sales promotion, the store gives customers who walk in wearing store-branded T-shirts a discount on purchases.

== Locations ==
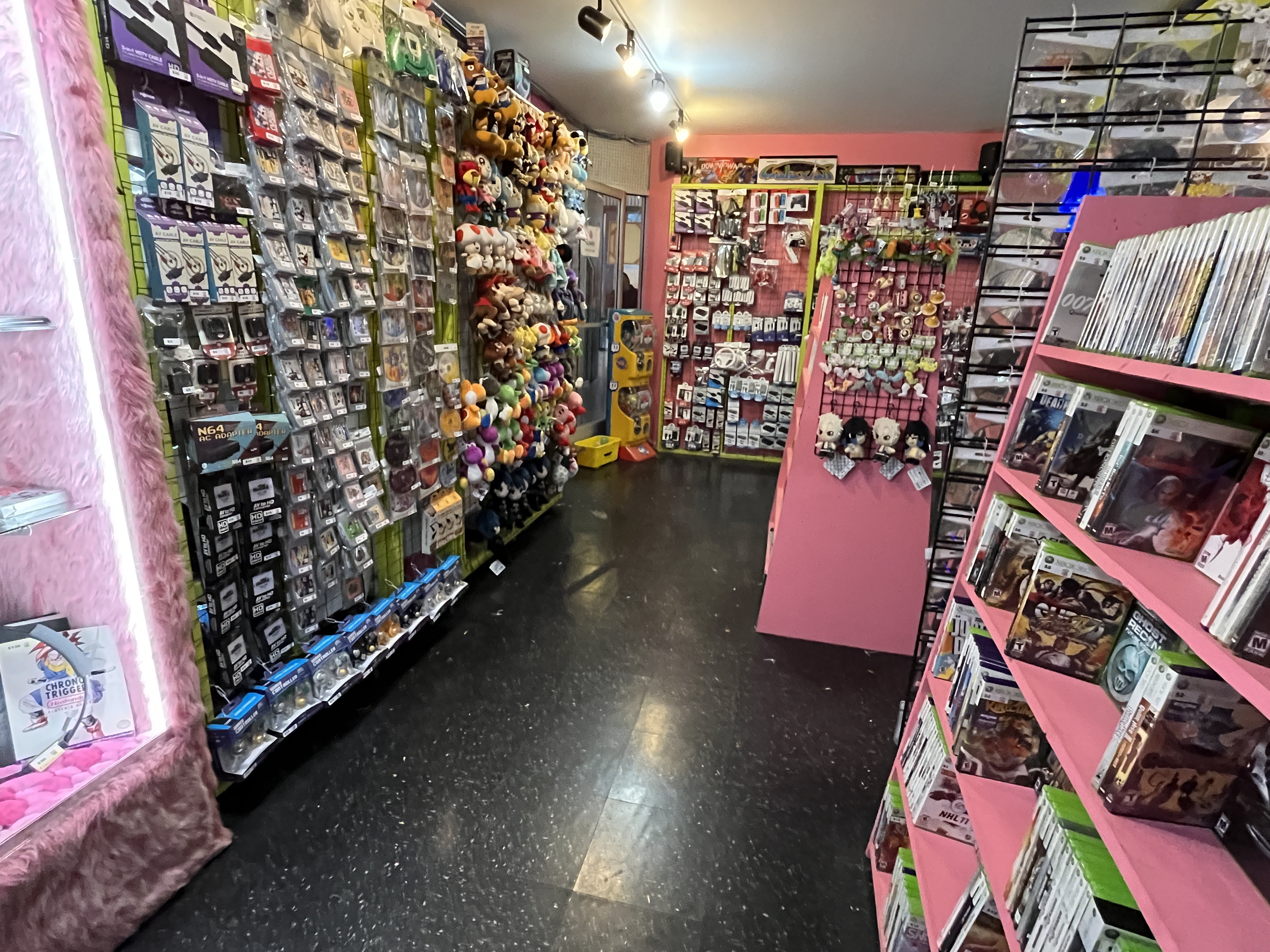
Interior of the Chinatown-International District shop, 2022

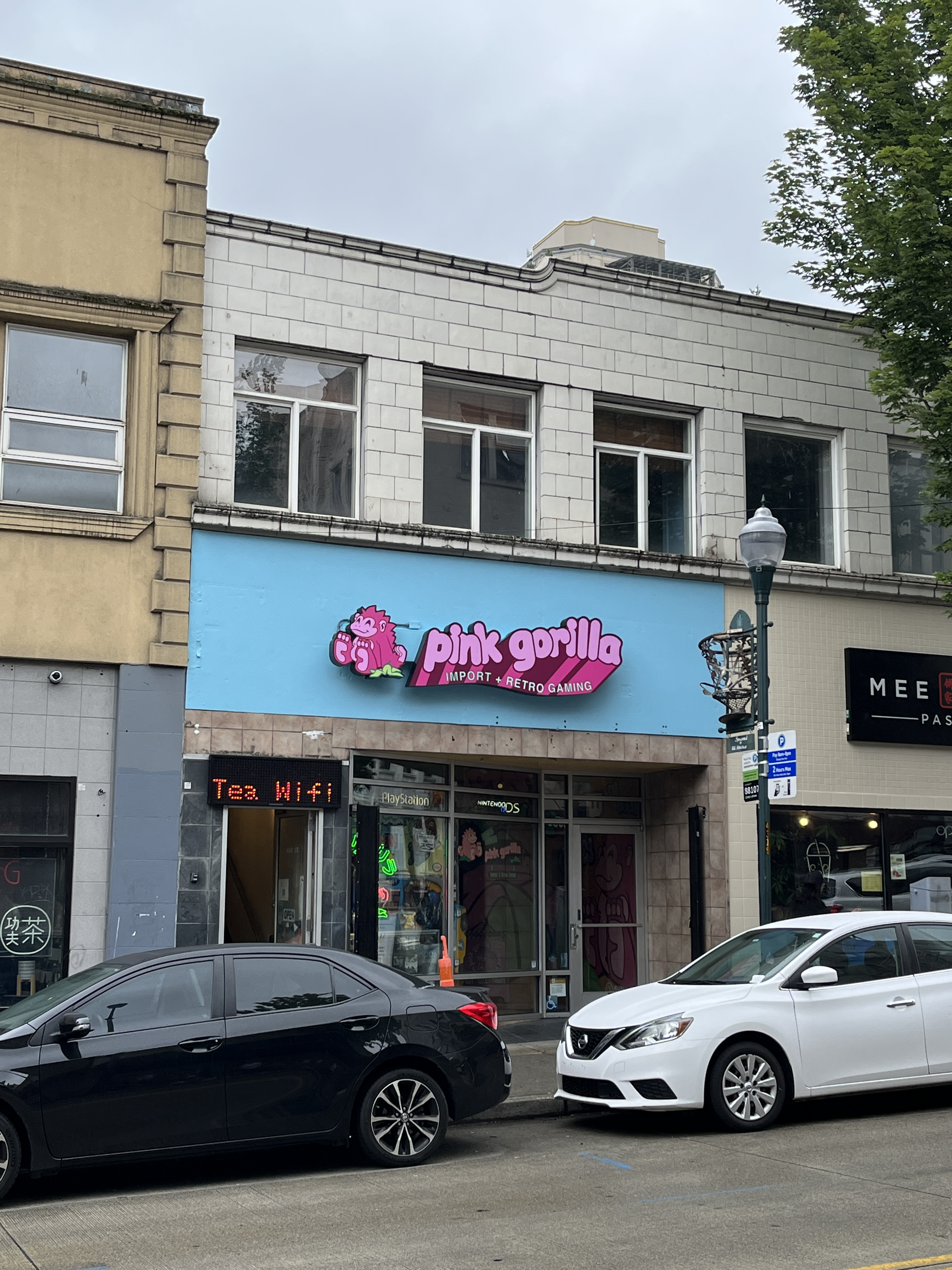
Exterior of the University District location, 2023

Pink Gorilla operates five retail locations. Three are located in Seattle, Washington, one in Las Vegas, Nevada and the fifth in Tempe, Arizona. The original Pink Gorilla store is located in the Chinatown-International District of Seattle, Washington. The company opened its second Seattle location in the University of Washington University District on October 13, 2009.

A third location on Seattle's Capitol Hill opened in January 2023 at a 1,400-square-foot (130 m^{2}) storefront facing East Pike Street.

A fourth location was announced on February 28th, 2025, in Las Vegas’s Chinatown. It opened on May 1st, 2025.

A fifth location opened in early 2026 in the city of Tempe, Arizona.

Video game players and Twitch.tv viewers from Spencer's streams are known to drive from nearby regions, including Canada and Oregon, to visit the store.

The stores aim to recreate video game outlets in Tokyo.

== Staff ==
Pink Gorilla was formerly owned by partners Nathan Paine and Greg Hess. The two both know Japanese, which they say helps them negotiate with Japanese game sellers. Paine noted, "[The] Japanese are more happy to have business with Japanese speakers, but not the outsiders who don't speak the language."

As of August 1, 2016, Pink Gorilla is owned by Cody Spencer and Kelsey Lewin. Spencer and Lewin both worked for Paine in the store for many years before purchasing the company in full from Paine and Hess. The new owners both work full time in the store. Spencer often live streams himself during and after normal business hours from inside the store fixing gaming consoles, walking around the local area, or performing other store tasks on the website Twitch.tv under the name DSKoopa.
