= The Dumping Ground series 6 =

The Dumping Ground
- Series 6
- Series Six Title Card
- Starring: Connor Byrne; Miles Butler-Hughton; Kia Pegg; Sarah Rayson; Stacy Liu; Lewis Hamilton; Ruben Reuter; Annabelle Davis; Hannah Moncur; Yousef Naseer; Jethro Baliba; Carma Hylton; Connor Lawson; Jasmine Uson; Emily Burnett; Leo James; Cole Welleans-Watts
- No. of episodes: 24

Release
- Original network: CBBC; CBBC HD
- Original release: 12 January – 7 December 2018

Series chronology
- ← Previous; Series 5 Next → Series 7

The sixth series of the British children's television series The Dumping Ground began broadcasting on 12 January 2018 on CBBC and ended on 7 December 2018. The series follows the lives of the children living in the fictional children's care home of Ashdene Ridge, nicknamed by them "The Dumping Ground". It consisted of twenty-four, thirty-minute episodes, airing in two halves in January and September; ten episodes for the second half premiered a week early on BBC iPlayer. It is the fourteenth series in The Story of Tracy Beaker franchise.

== Cast ==
=== Main ===
- Connor Byrne as Mike Milligan
- Miles Butler-Hughton as Tyler Lewis
- Kia Pegg as Jody Jackson
- Sarah Rayson as Floss Guppy
- Stacy Liu as May-Li Wang
- Lewis Hamilton as Ryan Reeves
- Ruben Reuter as Finn McLaine
- Annabelle Davis as Sasha Bellman
- Hannah Moncur as Chloe Reeves
- Yousef Naseer as Joseph Stubbs
- Jethro Baliba as Archie Able (episodes 1-8 only)
- Carma Hylton as Candi-Rose
- Connor Lawson as Alex Walker
- Jasmine Uson as Taz De Souza
- Emily Burnett as Charlie Morris
- Leo James as Bird Wallis (from episode 7)
- Cole Wealleans-Watts as Jay Wallis (from episode 7)

=== Guest ===
- Lauren Drummond as Hilde
- Victoria Alcock as Denise Jackson
- Ian Reddington as Grant
- Alexander Aze as Dexter Bellman (episodes 1 and 5)
- Gary Lucy as Billy McLaine
- Gary Lineker as himself
- Dani Arlington as Aileen Peters
- Isla McMonigle as Alice Peters
- Michelle Collins as Fiona Johnson
- Lucy Goodings as Emi
- Anya Jurowska as Amelie
- Kelton Hoyland as Brandon
- Colin Briggs as BBC News Presenter
- Micky Cochrane as John
- Kate Victors as Jacinda
- Annette Badland as Mavis Crinkle
- Louis Mahoney as Henry Lawrence
- William Talbot as Ross Maydons
- Diveen Henry as Sally Lewis
- Omar Malik as Kamal Hameed
- Oliver Wellington as Sam
- Jessie Williams as Lily Kettle
- Henry Miller as Steven Redpen
- Dani Harmer as Tracy Beaker
- Mia McKenna-Bruce as Tee Taylor
- Chris Slater as Frank Matthews
- Richard Wisker as Liam O'Donovan
- Kasey McKellar as Bailey Wharton
- Nelly Currant as Toni Trent
- Gwen Currant as Billie Trent
- Chris William Chris as Chad Wild Clay

== Episodes ==
No. overall	No. in series	Title	Directed by	Written by	Original release date	UK viewers (millions)
Part 1
91	1	"Jody on the Ropes"	David Innes Edwards	Dawn Harrison	12 January 2018	0.29
Jody borrows or takes things from the other young people and Swedish woman Hilde from the council's planning department arrives to see how The Dumping Ground uses its space. Jody arrives at her mum's for Denise's boyfriend Grant's visit and Sasha speaks to Dexter on video chat, who is now living with their mum and stepdad with Sasha due to move in later. Hilde agrees for Floss to help her and Jody struggles to tell Grant about a made up trip in Venice and Denise is against telling Grant that Jody is in care and orders Jody to bring some of her stuff to make it like she lives with her. Floss finds plans for a luxury bedroom conversion in the attic and the young people argue over who should get it, so Alex decides they should compete for it, with Sasha and Chloe making the rules. The competition Sasha sets is everyone having a red tag with their name on and if it's pulled off, they are eliminated and whoever has their tag remaining wins. Charlie climbs onto the shed roof with Alex refusing to move from near her. Jody packs some of her stuff, but opts to go to the gym when Mike won't let her go out herself and Archie helps Charlie move Alex by using the hose, so Charlie and Archie team up. Floss copies Hilde's style and accent and at the boxing gym, Jody is initially unenthusiastic, but soon takes to it. Floss wants Hilde to teach her Hygge and Jody runs away from the gym to Denise's when she calls whilst Floss gets Chloe to help make Swedish food for Hilde. Jody is unimpressed about having to wear a dress and heels for Denise to join Grant for a ballet show and when Grant tells Jody he wants him, her and Denise to be a family, Jody runs off. Hilde is reluctant to try the Swedish food. When Jody returns to the DG, Mike confronts her about why she is wearing a dress and barefoot, she snaps at Mike and May-Li when she returns to The Dumping Ground when they question what is wrong with her. Alex and Charlie are the only remaining players left, so they decide to both remove their tags and Hilde reveals the attic plans are for a billionaire and it turns out she is not Swedish. Denise threatens Jody to make things right with Grant or she will never forgive her. Guest Appearance: Alexander Aze as Dexter Bellman
92	2	"Saved by the Bell"	David Innes Edwards	Dawn Harrison	19 January 2018	0.22
May-Li takes Jody to the boxing gym and Jody snaps at Mike and May-Li when they disagree over boxing helping Jody's anger. Denise visits Jody and tells her that Grant is worried that she is missing as she is not with her, so later that day, Jody will have to come over to make herself look like a good mum. Candi-Rose is annoyed with Chloe when she shares an embarrassing photo between the young people and when Sasha finds Jody's ticket for the ballet, she confront her and Jody admits she has been seeing her mum outside of contact and pretending she lives at home for Grant. A house meeting is called when Jody accidentally injures Archie by kicking her door, where the young people complain about Jody's recent attitude and Jody loses her control, insisting they are not a family and Mike and May-Li don't care and Mike contacts Jody's social worker about her placement. Candi-Rose takes Chloe's mobile phone, so Ryan takes Candi-Rose's makeup for Chloe's revenge. Jody turns up at Denise's and when Grant has reported her missing, Grant is confused that Jody has been reported missing by The Dumping Ground and whilst trying to delete the embarrassing photo, Candi-Rose deletes all Chloe's photos. Denise makes out to Grant that Jody is in a care home for difficult children, but Jody reveals that she is in care for Denise neglecting her, being in prison and for the way Kingsley treated her and Grant ends the relationship. Denise angrily orders Jody to leave and Sasha explains to Mike about Jody and Denise, though Denise lies she hasn't seen Jody and Chloe breaks Candi-Rose's make up when she discovers her photos have been deleted. Jody spends the night sleeping rough before going to the boxing gym and May-Li is informed whilst Chloe and Candi-Rose mend their friendship. May-Li tells Jody she needs to find a way to deal with and control things. At The Dumping Ground, Denise apologises and tells Jody she will try and help herself, but Jody will only contact her when she is ready and when Jody confides in Mike and May-Li about her fears on being on her own, she is reassured that she won't be leaving for ages.
93	3	"Give and Take"	David Innes Edwards	Sarah-Louise Hawkins	26 January 2018	—
Floss compiles a list of the young people's qualities and Candi-Rose is annoyed that she is not noted as no one can think of anything she is good at, but Chloe makes Candi-Rose feel better by complimenting her shopping skills. Sasha finds out Charlie is selling her favourite things online whilst Archie loses his temper when he loses in a game of football. The young people are impressed with Candi-Rose when she manages to get Chloe some boots for half the price and May-Li is concerned for Charlie since she returned from her grandfather, so she asks Sasha to keep an eye on her. Sasha suggests to Charlie that they can make t-shirts to make money and May-Li recommends that Archie meditates to control his anger. Candi-Rose returns from shopping and further impresses the young people when she gets Jody a jacket for her budget amount, so Floss asks for a bag identical to Candi-Rose's, Alex asks for jeans and Taz wants some gold trainers, but with everything too expensive, Candi-Rose steals some jeans and the bag, which delight Floss and Alex. After Archie wants her help meditating, May-Li tells him to do it in the garden so she can finish her book and Charlie grows annoyed with Jody and Finn's help on making the t-shirts. Alex shows Candi-Rose a problem with his jeans and she admits to Taz she stole the trousers, so they cannot be returned as planned and Taz asks Floss to come with them and Mike. The jeans are taken back and Taz finds gold trainers, which Candi-Rose encourages her to take, but Taz doesn't want to, however, Candi-Rose puts them in her bag and they are chased by security. Taz is caught and banned from the shoe shop, but Candi-Rose confesses that she stole the trainers and Charlie tells Sasha that she needs money to pay for yoga for her grandfather that helped him when he fell, but he is no longer getting classes as his home has stopped paying. Candi-Rose is taken to the shop to apologise with Chloe, Floss and Taz for support.
94	4	"Heroes"	David Innes Edwards	Ian Kershaw	2 February 2018	0.22
Finn dreams about playing football professionally with his dad, but he annoys Sasha when he kicks a football that damages her art work. Finn overhears Alex telling May-Li he does not want to celebrate his birthday. Finn gains the idea from thinking of his dad to organise a birthday party for Alex whilst Joseph plans to move into Archie's room, but Archie is annoyed with Joseph when he accuses him of stealing his coat that Mike accidentally gave to him. Charlie agrees to help Finn organise Alex a birthday party after little interest from the other young people At lunch, Alex is furious to learn that Finn is planning a birthday, which hurts Finn as he takes his remarks personally. Archie and Joseph argue over the final sausage and spoil Sasha's art work with baked beans, so to get them to make up, Mike and May-Li pretend that if they do not make up, one of them will move to Sleepy Hollow, a house on an island. Charlie tells Alex that Finn has never had a birthday prior to living at The Dumping Ground or met his dad and when Joseph and Archie ask for votes, the young people refuse to vote for either of them over the other. Mike and May-Li are surprised that Sasha received positive feedback on her work and Finn is left with the deciding vote on Joseph and Archie, however, he insists they end arguing and share a room. Finn runs off when he is surprised by a Blackpool themed party in the garden, admitting to Alex that he never had a Blackpool birthday, but he enjoys the party and his bedroom is decorated like the Blackpool illuminations. Absent Tyler Lewis
95	5	"SorryNotSorry"	Fiona Walton	Kim Millar	9 February 2018	—
Sasha vlogs her last day at The Dumping Ground and Dexter arrives for a visit whilst Floss returns from the hospital with crutches after chipping a bone in her foot. Taz has to help Floss, but agrees as the injury was a result of using her rollerblades and Dexter is unhappy his things have been moved out of his old room as Joseph now shares with Archie. Dexter is excluded from Sasha's vlog by Joseph and Archie as he has left care and Jody is reluctant to be involved in the vlog. Dexter joins Joseph and Archie for a game of monopoly, but Joseph and Archie have changed the rules. To get Jody and Sasha to speak, Candi Rose tricks them into meeting in Sasha's room and locks the door on them. When Sasha records Jody, Jody admits she does not want Sasha to go, so Sasha gives Jody a book given by Tee when she left, but Sasha is angry when she finds a picture she drew that Jody took. At lunch, Sasha insults everyone when she says goodbye and Taz moves some of Floss' things on to some high shelves and the pair fight when Taz catches Floss climbing to get them. When Sasha is leaving, Jody tries to get Sasha to confess that she is scared about leaving as she likes The Dumping Ground. May-Li grounds Floss for faking her injury and Sasha becomes emotional in the car as Dexter makes her realise that The Dumping Ground is home for her. Sasha returns to The Dumping Ground with Mike, telling him she wants to remain at The Dumping Ground whilst she goes to college and the young people are thrilled with Sasha's choice. Guest Appearance: Alexander Aze as Dexter Bellman
96	6	"Cat's in the Cradle"	Fiona Walton	Mark Stevenson	16 February 2018	0.25
Alex and Charlie go round houses, offering to do gardening, but Alex leaves when he thinks he recognises one of the homeowners, Aileen and tells Finn and Charlie he thinks that Aileen is his mum. Taz is upset that Mike is selling the piano and Alex and Charlie return to Aileen. Taz argues with Mike over the sale of the piano and after overhearing Aileen on the phone, Alex attempts to ask about her job and Taz asks Tyler and Jody for help. May-Li is shocked when Archie purchases a load of carrots and Alex meets Aileen's daughter, Alice and Mike is baffled with the piano's disappearance. Taz pays Floss when she finds out about the piano being moved and Alice shows Alex her family photos, a trophy Aileen won and a newspaper clipping on Alex, which Alex takes. Archie struggles to sell the carrots, Alice arrives at The Dumping Ground and when Mike finds out the piano was not collected, he confronts the young people and threatens to take away their TV privileges for a week. Alex threatens to go to the papers about what Aileen did and when he walks Alice home, Alex and Alice talk about Aileen's job and that she was poor before and Alice plays knock a door and run. May-Li gives Archie the money back for the carrots and Mike talks to Taz about the piano, with Taz opening up about her dad teaching her to play and Taz impresses everyone when she plays. May-Li is annoyed when Archie buys parsnips and Alex returns the cutting to Alice, deciding not to ruin hers or Aileen's life.
97	7	"Challenging Times"	Fiona Walton	Keith Brumpton	23 February 2018	0.25
Brothers Jay and Bird arrive at The Dumping Ground late at night, taking Candi-Rose's room, so she moves in with Chloe. The next day, the young people are practising in preparation for their competition against Graybridge as Candi-Rose waits for Valentine's cards. When Graybridge arrive, Mike is shocked to see Fiona Johnson, a woman he once knew, who is acting careworker at Graybridge, but is a regional manager and she introduces the Graybridge young people to The Dumping Ground young people. The young people have little expectation from Graybridge, but find out that they are intelligent and Mike embarrassingly explains how he knows Fiona to May-Li. When food for Graybridge go missing, Floss is determined to prove that Graybridge were responsible, Tyler gets a Valentine's card and Mike and Fiona reminisce over their time at Glastonbury. Greybridge win the first quiz in the competition. The Dumping Ground win the next round where they have to build a square out of foam pieces, but Graybridge win the following round when they have to answer questions on a reenacted Doctor Who scene. When Fiona remarks Mike on his competitiveness, Mike remembers their dart march and them kissing and The Dumping Ground win the basketball round. Floss accuses Amelie of taking the food when she mistakes toothpaste for cream and is forced to apologise. Before the race in the competition, Amelie tells Charlie that Fiona has made things great at Graybridge in her time there, but will go back to rubbish when she leaves. Mike declares The Dumping Ground the winners of the competition when Amelie helps Emi cross the finishing line when her asthma plays up, but helping is against the rules. When Charlie sees how upset Emi is, the young people ask Mike to declare Graybridge the winners. Floss catches Jay taking a cake, but he tells May-Li that Bird has diabetes and May-Li is angry about Jay potentially putting Bird in danger due to no medical diagnosis and Jay vows to never stop taking care of Bird. First Appearance: Leo James as Bird Wallis and Cole Wealleans-Watts as Jay Wallis
98	8	"Two Sides to Every Story"	Fiona Walton	Keith Brumpton	2 March 2018	0.19
Jay has a nightmare that Bird ignores him in favour of the other young people. The young people are not happy that the food has been changed to accommodate Bird's diabetes. Sasha films a vlog of Mike and Fiona discussing the competition as May-Li discusses Bird's new diet. Candi-Rose wants Mike and Fiona to be a couple, so reads up about Fiona online and to get more personal details out of her, they interview Fiona, pretending it is for an interview for woman in leadership. Jay sternly reminds Bird that they are better on their own and the young people are not their friends. May-Li talks to Jay about supporting Bird with his diet, but he gets annoyed and alleges to Mike and Fiona that May-Li hit him, with Bird supporting Jay. Mike tells May-Li about Jay's allegation and she ridicules it, wanting an apology from Jay, but Fiona suspends her. Floss spreads the news to the young people when she overhears a conversation and Fiona allows Mike to investigate for a while off the record. Mike breaks up the young people when they are angry with Jay and Bird and later, they try to get Jay and Bird to admit May-Li did not hit him whilst locked in the attic. Sasha speaks to Bird on his home and tells them that The Dumping Ground is different to any other home they have been in and it can be home for them, which makes Bird admit that Jay lied. After talking it through, Mike and May-Li decide that Jay and Bird can stay and Bird stands up to Jay. Mike asks Fiona out for a coffee and Bird insists to Jay he wants to stay at The Dumping Ground. Last Appearance: Jethro Baliba as Archie Able
99	9	"Utopia"	Dave Beauchamp	Gareth Sergeant	9 March 2018	0.22
The young people's constant arguing leads Mike into cancelling their theme park trip, so Tyler decides to try and prevent the young people from arguing for the whole day when Mike says he'd buy VIP wristbands for the theme park. Tyler gets the young people to paint a happy image and when Joseph, Tyler and Floss argue over what to watch on television, Floss and Taz challenge each other to a dance-off with Joseph as the judge. The young people agree that they should get revenge on Mike, believing arguing is normal, but Tyler suggests the young people say the truth without anger and at the swimming pool, Alex backs out of joining Finn and is defensive when Finn questions if he can swim and when Finn asks Mike and May-Li if Alex can have swimming lessons, Jay overhears, so winds Alex up. Tyler snaps when Mike orders him to his room, declaring no rules and Mike and May-Li are locked in the office as the young people cause chaos. When Tyler orders the theme park trip to be reinstated to end the chaos, Mike crosses off future plans off the calendar and Alex rejects Finn's offer of help. Tyler is pressured into deciding what the young people should do about trips being cancelled and Jody shows her painting of Tyler she did. After speaking with Jody, Tyler decides they should end their rebellion and let Mike and May-Li out of the office and apologise. Floss and Taz fall asleep after their dance-off, the young people clean up and Alex announces that he wants swimming lessons.
100	10	"The Lurgy"	Dave Beauchamp	Owen Lloyd-Fox	16 March 2018	0.15
Mike arrives at The Dumping Ground, ill and complaining to May-Li and Finn begins to believe zombies are real. The young people recall to Mike the times May-Li had to run The Dumping Ground by herself, so she decides to do so again. Chloe and Joseph decide to make chicken soup when Joseph finds a recipe from his foster mum whilst May-Li sorts out the young people's problems. Whilst preparing the ingredients, Mike writes down a medication on the recipe, ripping off the last part of it and Chloe and Joseph look through the bin. Chloe finds an article on taste, so she suggests they taste to find the ingredient. May-Li helps Bird and Jay choose a colour for their room and she ends up fainting whilst Tyler falls asleep on the living room floor. Chloe and Joseph taste soup with different flavours and the young people declare the office as quarantine as Mike and May-Li are both ill, but May-Li becomes annoyed by Mike's complaining, so decides to work. Bird and Jay almost decide to keep their room the colour Candi-Rose had it, but let May-Li paint it and leave her so they don't get ill. Floss asks the young people to help pretend to be zombies for Finn and Joseph gets the final part of the recipe, which was up Mike's sleeve. Joseph gives Chloe a mug of soup and reveals the final part was for it to be served in a mug and with a hug, which was the amazing part. Floss gets Finn out into the garden under the pretense that there has been a zombie outbreak and the young people are pretending to be zombies. Mike and May-Li leave The Dumping Ground to go home, leaving the young people down to relief careworker, Dee.
101	11	"RyanMan"	Dave Beauchamp	Jeff Povey	23 March 2018	0.21
The young people and Mike return to The Dumping Ground to find The Dumping Ground has been broken into and when Ryan sneaks off, the intruder runs into him when he hears Mike and Ryan is praised by everyone for catching the thief. Ryan is let off his chores and given a medal from Joseph. When Alex is annoyed with having to do Ryan's chores, he reminds Alex that he considered number 1. Ryan is offered a reward, but makes out he is interested in being rewarded, earning more praise from Mike, but Ryan responds to the email, stating he wants a new games console. A boy from Jody's boxing gym, Brandon, arrives and gives Jody a new gum shield as a small gift and asks if Jody can help with his training. Ryan wants Joseph's help to do a reconstruction of stopping the thief for a blog, but he changes his mind and agrees with Chloe and Candi-Rose that it is dangerous upon spotting a watch in the tree. Jody gains consent from May-Li to help Brandon and Ryan hides the watch in his room whilst Tyler introduces himself to Brandon, stating that he is Jody's best friend. Ryan denies seeing the watch when Mike and May-Li tell him it has not been recovered and Candi-Rose's video of Ryan stopping the thief goes viral and he is also invited to be interviewed on TV. Jody rejects Brandon when he invites her out and Ryan appears nervous when he is interviewed on TV . When he returns to The Dumping Ground, Ryan finds the watch missing from his room and Jody goes out with Brandon. Ryan subtly warns the young people about the watch and over lunch, he becomes paranoid of everyone.
102	12	"Holding Out for a Hero"	Dave Beauchamp	Jeff Povey	30 March 2018	0.21
Ryan gets a note, ordering him to make breakfast for everyone and searches everyone's room for the watch whilst Mike finds Floss asleep in the office because of Taz's suspicion that the thief has returned. Mike gets a phone call from the Mayoress, who wants to meet Ryan, and Joseph and Finn find a piece of coal with tooth marks in the fruit bowl. Ryan panics when Mike and May-Li discuss Ryan and an image that was printed from the office, thinking it's one of him with the watch, but it turns out to be his face imposed on a clown. He thinks Sasha has been blackmailing him when he gets a call from her phone and confides in Chloe about the messages and that he found the watch. Chloe urges him to tell Mike and May-Li to put a stop to the messages, but he gets another note that instructs him to wash the car, but then it turns out he has to ride a tricycle until the end of lunch. Ryan gets another note and he has to dress up as a clown, which amuses the young people when he meets the Mayoress and Finn and Joseph are confused when May-Li confesses to eating coal. Taz confides in Floss when she asks that she doesn't like the door shut as the one time she had it shut, she never heard her mum and the next day, it was too late to help her. When Finn and Joseph try to figure out why May-Li eats coal, Ryan recalls that his mum ate coal when she was pregnant with Chloe. May-Li announces to Mike and the young people that she is pregnant and due before Christmas. Chloe admits she left the notes for Ryan as she felt he deserved it for the way he was acting and when Ryan gets his games console, he gives it to the young people.
Part 2
103	13	"Stuck"	Sean Glynn	Kim Millar	14 September 2018	0.20
Sasha jumps the queue for the bathroom, complains about breakfast, shows little interest in Candi-Rose's school disco problems and gets agitated with the other young people. After failing to supervise the younger ones, where Taz breaks a picture with a football, Mike grounds Sasha, so she is unable to go to a gig the following day. When Sasha wakes up, she is confused her calendar still is the same day, she has her gig tickets and is convinced everything is the same as the day before. Sasha is grounded again when Taz breaks a picture again with the football. When Sasha wakes up again on the same day, she uses the bathroom first and decides to do what she wants as well as refusing to help Joseph with his project and ruining Candi-Rose's dress, but is grounded again when the photo breaks. After repeatedly living the same day, Sasha sorts out the bathroom queue, helps out Mike and May-Li and makes breakfast for the young people, but Floss is pleased when Sasha gets annoyed over the photo that gets broken and she is grounded. When Sasha relives the day again, she helps Mike and May-Li out more, assigns jobs to the young people, compliments Candi-Rose on her dress, prevents Taz from breaking the photo and helps Joseph with his project. Sasha is pleased when she wakes up not on the same day with no bathroom queue with breakfast she likes and is allowed to the gig.
104	14	"The Secret"	Sean Glynn	Suzanne Cowie	21 September 2018	0.20
Joseph prepares for a visit from his prospective foster parents, John and Jacinda, and Floss uses a fortune teller. When John and Jacinda arrive, they give Joseph some clothes that are not his style, viewed as out of fashion by the others, and the young people question John and before they leave, John plays football with the young people that Joseph pretends to like. When Jody's tooth hurts, May-Li suggests a dentist appointment and Mike gets scared when Floss exaggerates a trip to the dentist. When Sasha blasts Ryan for his selfish attitude, he goes around the house and secretly helps people, so the young people form a plan to find out who it is helping. At John and Jacinda's house, Joseph tires himself out by playing all the garden games, faking his enthusiasm, and pretends to like Jacinda's healthy food. May-Li books in Mike and Jody at the dentist after Jody is visibly in pain as Mike tries to hide his fear, Finn finds Joseph in the shed before his visit to John and Jacinda's whilst Sasha believes Alex is the one helping out and receives praise, but Ryan claims responsibility, though he is not believed and ridiculed. Mike runs out of the dentist and admits to Jody he has not been to the dentist for ages, but Jody reassures him and Ryan destroys what he fixed. Joseph goes missing at John and Jacinda's, but Finn finds him in their shed and realises Joseph is unhappy, but will not admit it due to the fear of hurting John and Jacinda, but later reveals his true feelings.
105	15	"Bird's Song"	David Innes Edwards	Marissa Lestrade	28 September 2018	0.17
The young people search for a limited number of tickets to a launch party, with those who do not find a ticket having to go to the forest with Mike and Charlie and Jay forces Bird to give him the last found ticket. Charlie, Taz, Sasha, Bird and Candi-Rose arrive at the forest with Mike, who is using a step counter watch, and are greeted by Mavis Crinkle, the forest guide, who Charlie is a fan of and are given an orienteering activity to complete. Bird is wary when the presence of a possible big cat is mentioned and Candi-Rose goes off to look for particular plants. In the next activity of collecting unnatural forest objects, Bird is put in charge of timekeeping, and with the rubbish collected, they are given the activity of building a forest related creature and then have to build a den. Bird's confidence improves when he takes lead on building his and Candi-Rose's den and win whilst Charlie destroys hers and Taz's in retaliation of Mavis' comments; Mavis allows Charlie to take lead on finding a flower no one has ever found. Candi-Rose opens up about her older sister and family to Bird; Bird guesses Candi-Rose's name is not her real name and Bird talks about the impact of moving homes had on Jay and Bird runs off when Candi-Rose teases Jay's bed wetting. With her knowledge and skills picked up from Mavis, Charlie finds the spot the flower should be and Mavis confesses the flower no longer grows, but compliments Charlie.
106	16	"Home"	Sean Glynn	Furquan Akhtar	5 October 2018	0.19
Charlie's granddad, Henry, arrives at The Dumping Ground to visit after initially cancelling and Taz is annoyed by Floss recording her singing in her sleep as Tyler prepares to host the kids in care forum and his pitch to gain a share of a surplus of spare council money; Floss believes she should be representative in place of Tyler, so under stress, he agrees. Henry meets everyone, talks about Charlie's gran and his care home and joins in a cricket match. Henry later discusses with everyone what Charlie was like when she was younger and that she believed babies came from plssticine when she wanted siblings, but the young people have fulfilled her wish. In the debate, Floss wins over the other care kids with her belief that sugary treats should be retained and fellow kids in care forum representative Ross suggests he and Floss work together. Charlie grows worried for Henry when he tells her that she should go alone to their future planned trip to the Galapagos Islands when she is 18 and Charlie is told by Henry he is ill; Charlie wants to take care of Henry. Taz and Chloe try to work out what she is singing in the video and she could be singing in a Filipino language. Henry reassures Charlie is he is fine at the home and they still have time and during the pitch, Floss is unhappy that Ross pitches her idea. Taz works out she has been singing a food rhyme her mum sang to her and Charlie is made a bucket list by Alex and Joseph with Henry's wishes for her.
107	17	"Faker"	Sean Glynn	Dawn Harrison	12 October 2018	0.20
When his mum does not arrive on time for contact and worried, Tyler decides to go to see her and is introduced to Sally's boyfriend, Kamal. Bird agrees to take on jobs for the young people and Taz decides to enter a science competition alongside Joseph. Tyler is further shocked when Sally reveals she and Kamal are getting married in Las Vegas as Bird decides to stand up for himself, so decides to do a game where if he wins, he does no jobs or if the young people win, he does double; Floss wins round one as Chloe wins round two. Jody advises Tyler to keep out of Sally's relationship and Bird loses another two rounds to Alex and Charlie. Believing Kamal is a fraud, Tyler turns up at one of his motivational talks, where he witnesses Kamal hugging another woman and after losing against Ryan, Bird demands a rematch with the prize for Bird winning is Ryan doing all the jobs, but if Bird loses, he will take on Ryan's chores. Bird wins after using his right hand in snooker as revenge for people not taking their jobs back, which disgusts everyone, especially Candi-Rose. Tyler confides in Sally about his suspicions of Kamal and both Joseph and Taz cheat with their slime making for the competition, but work together. After filming footage of Kamal putting the engagement ring he gave to Sally on the other woman, Sally dumps him, but Kamal explains to Tyler he was going to give Sally his grandmother's engagement ring and the woman was his sister. After Tyler explains to Sally, she reconciles with Kamal and instead of a robot, Joseph receives slime for his prize.
108	18	"Me, Myself and I"	Mark Reynaud	Mark Stevenson	19 October 2018	0.25
Mike brings Jody, Alex, Taz, Charlie and Jay to an abandoned school, Hindholm High, to do it up so it can be used for clubs, with them being selected to do so because of their recent behaviour, apart from Charlie; Jody wants to hurry up so she can do boxing and see Brandon. Former temporary careworker Sam is also helping on the orders of Fiona, who is not enjoying his fast tracked desk job and Mike finds out from Sam that Fiona has been hinting that she wants commitment for her relationship with Mike. Mike is not happy with Sam when he allows the young people to wander off, apart from Jody, and he grounds the young people, so Jody kicks a football, setting off the fire alarm. Jody decides to revert to how she used to behave when Mike comments on it, so she encourages the young people to hide from Mike and Sam and trash the school and whilst looking for them, Sam asks Mike for a reference for a new job as an events manager. Sam figures out Jay use to attend the school and he liked his former headteacher, but he did not like his next school. After Jody insults Jay over how clever he actually is, Jody makes up with Jay and offers to teach him how to box. Sam decides to stick with care work and Jay ties a school tie to the gates.
109	19	"Jay and Bird's Day Off"	Jamie Annett	Gareth Sergeant	26 October 2018	0.16
Bird and Jay fake being ill to get out of a careers fair, with Candi-Rose an accomplice and Charlie is not allowed to go to a book signing, despite preparing a careers pack; Charlie is unimpressed when she suspects Bird and Jay faking food poisoning. Bird and Jay sneak out and to prove Bird and Jay faking it, Charlie phones Mike and gets him to go into their room, however, they put stuff in their beds to pretend. After watching Ryan scam Floss, Charlie asks Ryan for advice in exchange for chores and during their day out, Jay gets excited when they find a shop selling collectable toy cars that he and Bird used to have. Charlie sneaks out of the careers fair when she finds a message in her book written from Jay, but Candi-Rose does not let Charlie in. Bird tells Jay that he likes The Dumping Ground, but Jay warns Bird that they should not get attached, believing their parents will come for them. Charlie is caught by Mike and when Jay buys a toy car, Bird is annoyed that Jay will not listen to him, so they return to their former home and Bird tells him the truth about Jay's memories as well as digging up their toy cars that were buried in a tin. When Charlie, Bird and Jay bump into each other, they race home and Candi-Rose lets the boys in by the back, but Charlie reveals Bird and Jay's photos, taken in the photo booth with the date. When Candi-Rose guesses that Mike is going to propose to Fiona that night, Charlie decides not to tell. Jay gives Charlie a book that he got signed for her and Charlie insists Bird and Jay do hers and Ryan's chores for a month. Bird, Jay and Candi-Rose are caught by Jay's wallet being left in a shop, but Jay accepts responsibility and Mike announces he is getting married.
110	20	"Wasters"	Jamie Annett	Rachel Smith	2 November 2018	0.18
Alex cooks breakfast in preparation for his new job at Lily's café, The Kettle Stand, but Ryan enjoys it when Alex makes mistakes. Chloe wants to know the gender of May-Li's baby to buy a gift, which May-Li and her wife, Alice, want to keep a surprise. Mike drops Alex off at Lily's café. Joseph, Caandi-Rose and Floss decide to do the mummy challenge, which Taz, Bird and Jay decide to join in with as well as the last winners, Jody and Tyler, but Joseph wants to find a way to speed up the competition. Chloe and Sasha take a scan photo from the office, but accidentally spill juice on it and when Alex returns home to change his clothing, he tells Charlie and Finn about only doing washing up at Lily's café and all he has to look forward to, but they try to motivate him. Upon his return, Alex asks Lily for more interesting responsibilities and Alex gives a homeless man a sandwich. Mike discovers the toilet roll gone whilst Joseph and Taz make sub spinner for the competition. Chloe and Sasha search for a scan photo online and Ryan and Finn visit the café; Ryan deliberately winds Alex up leading to Alex rubbing avocado toast in his face and walking out. Floss is discovered to have cut the toilet rolls when she and Candi-Rose are declared the winners of the mummy challenge, but Joseph and Taz instead win. May-Li sticks a new scan picture up on the fridge rather than keeping it in the office, but it's actually a dog scan, however, she has two spare. Lily visits The Dumping Ground to tell Alex about what she thought of Mike when she arrived at Elm Tree House and points out Alex's positive moments at the café as well as barring Ryan for what he did to Alex. Guest Appearance: Jessie Williams as Lily Kettle
111	21	"Joyless Division"	Alex Jacob	Keith Brumpton	9 November 2018	0.22
People from the council's compliance and amenities department arrive for an experiment at The Dumping Ground that involves cameras being fitted, altering the interior layout and then arrange a stakeholder's meeting. Steven Redpen from the council explains to the young people that they have been selected to take part in an experiment for a few days based on his study that boys and girls do better when they live and study apart, so The Dumping Ground will be converted into two units, which also involves them having no mobiles. Steven also explains that they will be rewarded with a trip, chosen by the team that does best. Steven observes the house from monitors set up in the shed as the young people delegate their communal areas, breakfast times and who should have the football pitch and the plastic sheets for divisions are put up. The girls and boys begin to enjoy living separately, but Charlie and Alex grow annoyed at the girls and boys respectively as they think each other team is doing well and the young people voice their opinions to Steven through a camera. When Candi-Rose speaks to Steven, she realises that Steven is sad because his mother sent him to a boys' school, separating him from a girl he liked, Julia Bogdanovic, and Steven decides to recruit undercover agents. Candi-Rose and Bird secretly arrange to meet by using the chessboard, but they are warned away from each other, despite their being no cameras, however, it turns out Floss and Jay were recruited by Steven. The young people remove the plastic barriers, but Steven still believes boys and girls are better off apart and announces the girls will be moving to Graybridge permanently and the boys from Graybridge will move to The Dumping Ground, which results in uproar from the young people, Mike and May-Li. The next day, the girls pack up their things, however, Steven changes his mind when Candi-Rose tracks down Julia, choosing to trust the young people rather than his study. Note: in this episode the Dumping Ground sings songs when the boys and girls are separated.
112	22	"No Escaping"	Alex Jacob	John Hickman	16 November 2018	0.20
Whilst boxing, Brandon invites Jody on holiday to Florida with his parents and when Jody discusses it with Sasha and Candi-Rose, they bring up Tyler and the time when everyone thought they would get together. Jody insists they are no more than friends, but is advised b Sasha and Candi-Rose to take the risk as it could be her last chance. Taking tips from Sasha and Candi-Rose through a mobile, Jody tells Tyler about the holiday invite and asks if he thinks Brandon is being too serious. Jody finds a photo album and she and Tyler reminisce and remember when they promised to be friends before Jody questions Tyler's opinions on Brandon, though Tyler is reluctant to answer and to get the truth, Jody points out Brandon's positive qualities. Tyler finds out Jody has been talking to Sasha and Candi-Rose, so Jody hangs up and locks the door when Tyler threatens to go. Jody confronts Tyler over him disliking Brandon and Tyler brings up the time Jody attempted to set him up with Sophie from the skatepark. They then talk about the fire and Jody claims Tyler does not care, forcing Tyler to admit he cares too much and does not like her being with someone else and Jody admits she wanted him with Sophie because he liked him. Tyler and Jody admit they feel relieved about revealing their true feelings and as they are about to kiss, Tyler recalls his dream on their first kiss. As they attempt to kiss again, Tyler is forced to hide when Mike knocks on the door and Jody and Tyler try to work out how to be boyfriend and girlfriend. When Tyler suggests that he should move to another home, Jody instead suggests they remain friends, to which Tyler agrees with. Note: This episode has several flashbacks of earlier episodes of the Dumping Ground and even a few Tracy Beaker returns episodes so several characters that has departed the DG previously, can be spotted in this episode.
113	23	"To Have and Not to Hold"	Jamie Annett	Jeff Povey	30 November 2018	0.28
On the morning of Mike and Fiona's wedding, Sasha takes charge and encourages everyone to work as a team and behave for Mike. As the marquee is decorated, all the boys, except Joseph, forcefully take Mike to the attic and Charlie allows Joseph to come on her visit to her granddad with May-Li. Fiona speaks to Candi-Rose via videochat, asking for her to do her hair and makeup and in the attic, the boys reveal a surprise stag-do for Mike. At her granddad's care home, May-Li breaks the news to Charlie that her granddad has passed away. Ryan insults the young people when they give Mike a fossil as a sign that he is their rock. Charlie finds out from May-Li that her granddad passed away that morning after being poorly during the night and Charlie does not want to tell Mike on his wedding day. Ryan loses his temper when he is expected to give Mike a gift, which he was excluded from knowing about as well as the stag-do and he smashes Mike's wedding cake before packing his stuff. On their way home, May-Li goes into labour and Charlie is forced to take charge, so she instructs Joseph to find signal to phone an ambulance and gets May-Li into the back of the car. Charlie realises that she will have to deliver May-Li's baby as it is almost delivered. After the smashed cake is discovered, Chloe tells Mike that she found a note from Ryan and Mike contacts Ryan, who apologises, but believes he will never change and no one can help him and after, he is rude to a woman he knocks into. Charlie feels unable to deliver May-Li's baby, but May-Li inspires her and Charlie delivers May-Li's baby, whom she names Henry after Charlie's granddad. Back at The Dumping Ground, the young people gather in the living room and realise Ryan and Mike are not around. The woman from the bus station turns up at The Dumping Ground and turns out to be Tracy Beaker, who is acting as Mike's best man and is concerned about Mike's whereabouts. Guest Appearance: Dani Harmer as Tracy Beaker
114	24	"Missing Presumed Single"	Jamie Annett	Jeff Povey	7 December 2018	0.31
After the young people and Tracy fail to find Mike around The Dumping Ground, so Tracy plans to search for Mike with the help of the young people before Fiona's arrival, but Fiona arrives early, so Tracy delegates tasks. Mike locates Ryan at the bus station and Tracy puts the word out on social media about Mike's disappearance, which several former residents respond to. Jody, Candi-Rose and Taz plan to hold Fiona up when it comes to her hair and make up and some of the young people are introduced to Henry on video chat. Chloe tells Tracy about Ryan's disappearance and Tracy recognises Ryan from a photo, so goes to the bus station. Despite Mike's attempts to instil positivity into Ryan, Ryan insists he is always angry and goes back to the incident when he supposedly stopped the thief, admitting the thief was only stopped by tripping over Ryan. Tracy turns up and asks Ryan to allow Mike happiness on his wedding day for what he does for them; Ryan agrees, but Mike then decide he cannot get married as his wedding has made him lose focus, but Tracy talks him round. When the cab leaves, Tracy borrows a tandem bike for her and Mike, with Ryan running behind. When Fiona is done with her makeup, Jody and Candi-Rose panic, so when Jody is sent to ask Mike a question by Fiona, Candi-Rose tells the truth that Mike is not around. Lily, Tee, Frank, Liam, Bailey, Tony and Billie arrive for Mike's wedding, but Fiona decides not to go ahead, believing it is payback for rejecting Mike when they were younger. Mike is upset when everyone breaks the news for him and Fiona later finds old photos that were planted into her bag by Candi-Rose of her and Mike. Tracy arrives back at The Dumping Ground with Fiona and she and Mike get married and Ryan apologises to Mike, but thanks him and May-Li as they help make them more perfect. Mike is told by Joseph about Charlie's granddad and Mike gives Charlie the letter from her granddad, which she reads with Sasha's support. After their wedding, Mike and Fiona leave with Mike's dream car. Guest Appearances: Dani Harmer as Tracy Beaker, Jessie Williams as Lily Kettle, Mia McKenna-Bruce as Tee Taylor, Chris Slater as Frank Matthews, Richard Wisker as Liam O'Donovan, Kasey McKellar as Bailey Wharton, Nelly Currant as Toni Trent and Gwen Currant as Billie Trent Last Appearance: Yousef Naseer as Joseph Stubbs

=== Notes ===
- Episodes 13-22 of the series premiered on BBC iPlayer exactly a week before their TV airing; the figures in the table above refer to the date of their first broadcast (i.e. on BBC iPlayer).
- From series 6b onwards, all viewing figures are four-screen ratings which include pre-transmission viewing.
