= The Wacky Hi-Jinks of Adrenalin O.D. =

Studio album by Adrenalin O.D.
- Released: 1984
- Recorded: 1984 at Sanctuary, Caldwell, N.J.
- Genre: Hardcore punk, punk rock
- Length: 24:02
- Label: Buy Our Records
- Producer: Adrenalin O.D.

Adrenalin O.D. chronology
| Let's Barbecue (EP) (1983) | The Wacky Hi-Jinks of Adrenalin O.D. (1984) | HumungousFungusAmongus (1986) |

The Wacky Hi-Jinks of Adrenalin O.D. is the debut album by hardcore punk band Adrenalin O.D. It was released in 1984 through the band's own label Buy Our Records.

The album is celebrated as being one of the most ridiculous albums in punk and one of Adrenalin O.D.'s best efforts. It is known for its speed, sense of humor and sarcastic lyrics that satirize middle-class suburban living.

The album was later reissued in 2008 on Chunksaah Records.

== Track listing ==
All tracks are written by Adrenalin O.D.

| No. | Title | Length |
|---|---|---|
| 1. | "A.O.D. vs. Godzilla" | 3:06 |
| 2. | "White Hassle" | 1:26 |
| 3. | "New Years Eve" | 1:18 |
| 4. | "Small Talk" | 1:34 |
| 5. | "Going to a Funeral" | 1:53 |
| 6. | "Corporate Disneyland" | 1:13 |
| 7. | "Trans Am (The Saga Continues)" | 1:38 |
| 8. | "Sightseeing" | 2:47 |
| 9. | "Middle-Aged Whore" | 1:31 |
| 10. | "World War IV" | 1:14 |
| 11. | "Clean and Jerk" | 1:39 |
| 12. | "Sleep" | 1:22 |
| 13. | "Rah-Jah!" | 0:49 |
| 14. | "Rock & Roll Gas Station" | 2:21 |
| 15. | "Paul's Not Home" | 0:11 |

== Personnel ==
- Lead vocals, guitar - Paul Richard
- Guitar, vocals - Bruce Wingate
- Bass, vocals - Jack Steeples
- Drums, vocals - Dave Scott

Production

- Engineered by Vito C
- Produced by Adrenalin O.D.
