= Adrenalin O.D. =

American hardcore punk band

Adrenalin OD
- Origin: Elmwood Park, New Jersey, United States
- Genres: Hardcore punk, punk rock
- Years active: 1981–1990, 1999, 2005, 2007, 2022–
- Labels: Buy Our Records; Relapse (reissue); Chunksaah Records (reissue)
- Past members: Jim Foster; Dave Schwartzman; Paul Richard; Jack Steeples; Bruce Wingate; Wayne Garcia; Keith Hartel; Dennis Miller

Adrenalin O.D. was an American hardcore punk band from New Jersey that existed from 1981 to 1990. They were best known for playing fast-paced music accompanied with humorous lyrics.

== History ==
Adrenalin O.D. formed in October 1981, from the demise of late 1970s punk band The East Paterson Boys Choir. A.O.D.'s first recordings saw release on the widely distributed New York Thrash cassette compilation released on ROIR cassettes in 1982. The compilation also featured the first recordings of the Beastie Boys, as well as prominent New York City punk bands like Kraut and the Washington DC band Bad Brains. The comedic and speedy "Paul's Not Home" became a college radio hit.

A.O.D.'s first vinyl release, a six-song (EP) entitled Let's Barbeque, was released on their own Buy Our Records label. Because the budget was so tight, the band could only afford 15 minutes of studio time. They recorded all six tracks in one take with no overdubs. Buy Our Records became one of New Jersey's largest indie punk labels and springboarded the careers of many bands including Flag of Democracy, Raging Slab, and Pussy Galore.

Adrenalin O.D.'s first album entitled The Wacky Hijinks of Adrenalin O.D. showcased the band's use of blazing speed-punk and sarcastic lyrics, taking aim at the suburban experience with songs like "Middle Aged Whore", "Trans Am" (the inspiration for the Dead Milkmen's "Bitchin' Camaro"), and the crowd favorite "Rock n' Roll Gas Station". The album contains an untitled and blatantly obvious backmasked track. When played backwards, it is the band members saying in unison; "God is very, very nice. Be kind to animals. Satan sucks." The band turned down offers from virtually every major metal label looking to market the band to the emerging thrash metal crowds, maintaining that even though their songs had a metallic edge they were a punk band. Some of the songs on HumungousFungusAmongus are the fastest hardcore tracks ever recorded.

Adrenalin O.D. toured nationally and created a loyal following via their live shows (described by some as an experience somewhere between Minor Threat and Don Rickles.) The band's quick wit and on-stage banter was at times as much of an improv stand-up comedy act as a hardcore punk band, and fans coined the term "funny-punk" to describe their performances. Tracks that exhibit the band's quirky sense of humor include a punk rock cover of Henry Mancini's "Baby Elephant Walk", a surf rock version of "Hava Nagila" entitled "Surfin' Jew", and a track entitled "Masterpiece" which is a punk reworking of Jean-Joseph Mouret's Fanfare-Rondeau from Symphonies and Fanfares for the King's Supper (which the band knew only as the theme from the PBS TV series Masterpiece Theatre). In response to the question, "Favorite Monster?", asked in a 1984 interview with Flesh and Bones magazine, Richard answered "Dave Scott;" Steeples answered "Paul Richard's Mom;" Wingate answered "Godzilla;" and Scott answered "Linda Blair (Excorcist)."

By their third release Cruising With Elvis in Bigfoot's UFO, the band brought in producer Daniel Rey to help the band's translation from hyper-speed to mid-tempo melodic punk. With songs like "Bulimic Food Fight", and "My Mother Can't Drive", both Stereo Review Magazine and Decibel Magazine ranked the album among the funniest records of all time. Their last release Ishtar produced by Andy Shernoff Dictators for Restless/Enigma Records saw the band starting to lose their momentum and interest. Ishtar was over budget and only available for a short time before the label folded.

Bands that have cited Adrenalin O.D. as a major influence include NOFX, Anthrax, Screeching Weasel, Bouncing Souls, Night Birds, Municipal Waste, Darkthrone, and S.O.D.

== Post-breakup ==
After parting ways with Adrenalin O.D. in 1986, Jack Steeples took over the guitar duties for Mental Decay. Mental Decay recorded and released three 7"s ("Mental Decay", "Elvis Demilo", and "Walking Stick") plus two cuts with the Headache Records compilation with Steeples on guitar. He left Mental Decay in 1995 and "cleaned up." He rejoined Mental Decay again for a short time in 1996 to record and play a number shows. In December 1995, Steeples took over bass duties and rejoined his friend and Adrenalin O.D. frontman Paul Richard in the Kowalskis. Steeples' first show with the Kowalskis would be opening for Iggy Pop. Fronted by Kitty Kowalski, the Kowalskis released a single and an album on the Blackout record label.

Band members Bruce Wingate and Wayne Garcia went on to form a three-man band Bruce Wayne in tribute to both of their first names and the secret identity of comic book hero Batman. In the mid-1990s Wingate was the musical director for two tours by cult figure Harvey Sid Fisher. He has continued to write and record as the frontman for many groups, including The International Brunch Mummies, Shyster Shyster & Flywheel, New Reagans, The Earls Of Sandwich, and the TXT PSTLZ (text pistols). He also formed a joke-techno band called Total Dick which progressed and renamed itself to District Allstarz.

Original guitarist Jim Foster was a founding member of Electric Frankenstein in 1991. Drummer Dave Scott spent three years with the ill-fated New Jersey "supergroup" Scrooge (later Grimelord) with members of Genocide and Niblick Henbane, before going on to Atlantic Recording artists Lucy's Trance. He later relocated to Florida and has played in The Hybrids, November Charlie, The F-Pipes and The Rondos. He also managed Nutrajet featuring Greg Reinel.

Adrenalin O.D. has reunited several times, including a benefit for CBGB's, along with The Dead Boys, Peter and the Test Tube Babies, and Flipper in August 2005. In 1999, they reunited to record the 31-second track "Your Kung Fu Is Old...and Now You Must Die!!!" for the compilation CD Short Music For Short People. In February 2013, Jack White and Gibby Haynes collaborated on a cover of Adrenalin O.D.'s song "Paul's Not Home" for Jack White's Third Man Records label.

The band is referenced in the video for "Milwaukee" by The Both, wherein Ted Leo plays both himself and his fictional uncle Ed Leo, who reportedly played drums for Adrenalin O.D.

In 2022, DiWulf Publishing released David Scott Schwartzman's book, "If It's Tuesday This Must Be Walla Walla: The Wacky History of Adrenalin O.D." chronicling the early history of the band. As part of the book release, AOD reunited and played two shows in November 2022.

The band performed 3 times in the United States in late 2024. The band have a United Kingdom tour planned for the summer of 2025.

== Members ==
The band's original line-up was as follows:

- Paul Richard – guitar, vocals (1981–1990, 1999, 2005, 2007, 2022–)
- Jim Foster – guitar (1981–1983, 2022–)
- Jack Steeples – bass guitar (1981–1986, 1999, 2005, 2007, 2022–)
- Dave Scott (Schwartzman) – drums (1981–1990, 1999, 2005, 2007, 2022–)

Later members of the band included:

- Bruce Wingate – guitar (1984–1990, 1999, 2005, 2007)
- Keith Hartel – bass (1987–1989)
- Ed Leo – drums (exact timeline unknown)
- Wayne Garcia – bass guitar (1989–1990)

== Discography ==
=== Albums ===
- The Wacky Hi-Jinks of Adrenalin O.D. (1984)
- HumungousFungusAmongus (1986)
- Cruising With Elvis in Bigfoot's UFO (1988)
- Ishtar (1990)
- Phat and Old Live On WFMU (1996)

=== Singles/EPs ===
- Let's Barbeque E.P. (Buy Our Records, 1983)
- Caught in the Act split 7" with Bedlam (1984)
- Nice Song in the Key of D 7" (Buy Our Records 005, 1986)
- Theme From an Imaginary Midget Western (1988)
- Sentimental Abuse (Headache Records, 1996)

=== Compilation albums ===
- Sittin' Pretty (1995)
- A.O.D. Themes – rare and unreleased demos 1981–1982 (2001)
- The Barbeque Years - Rare and Unrealeased 1982 Demos (2025)

== Compilation appearances ==
- New York Thrash cassette (ROIR, 1981)
- New Jersey's Got It? (Buy Our Records, 1985)
- Rat Music for Rat People, Vol. 3 (CD Presents, 1987)
- Short Music For Short People (Fat Wreck Chords, 1999)
