= HumungousFungusAmongus =

Studio album by Adrenalin O.D.
- Released: 1986
- Recorded: 1986 at House Of Music, West Orange, NJ
- Genre: Hardcore punk, punk rock
- Label: Buy Our Records
- Producer: Adrenalin O.D.

Adrenalin O.D. chronology
The Wacky Hi-Jinks of Adrenalin O.D. (1984)	HumungousFungusAmongus (1986)	Cruising with Elvis in Bigfoot's UFO (1988)

HumungousFungusAmongus is the second album released by American hardcore punk band Adrenalin O.D. It was first released in 1986 on vinyl through the band's label Buy on Records. The album was reissued on CD by Relapse Records in 2004.

The album continues the mix of fast paced hardcore and mid-tempo melodic punk that was shown on their debut The Wacky Hi-Jinks of Adrenalin O.D..

== Track listing ==
No.	Title	Lyrics/Music	Length
1.	"A.O.D. vs. Son of Godzilla"	Adrenalin O.D.
2.	"Office Buildings"	Richard
3.	"Yuppie"	Richard
4.	"The Answer"	Wingate
5.	"Pope on a Rope"	Scott/Steeples
6.	"Fishin' Musician"	Richard, Steeples/Richard
7.	"Pizza-n-Beer"	Steeples/Adrenalin O.D
8.	"Bugs"	Scott/Wingate, Steeples
9.	"Youth Blimp"	Richard
10.	"Commercial Cuts"
11.	"Survive"	Scott/Richard
12.	"Masterpiece"
13.	"Crowd Control"	Wingate, Steeples
14.	"Velvet Elvis"	A.O.D./Richard
15.	"Fuck the Neighbors"	Steeples, Richard
16.	"Surfin' Jew"	Traditional
17.	"Bruce's Lament"	Wingate
18.	"Nice Song"	Richard

== Personnel ==
- Paul Richard - Lead Vocals, Guitar
- Bruce Wingate - Guitar
- Jack Steeples - Bass
- Dave Scott - Drums

Production

- Producer - Adrenalin O.D.
- Engineer - Danny Grigsby
- Front Cover Artwork - Bruce Wingate
- Back cover Artwork - Angel Izquierdo
- Photography - Ron Akiyama
- Art Direction - AVR Composition Union
