= Large (surname) =

Origin
- Origin: Latin, Old French, Middle English
- Meaning: "abundant" "ample" "big" "generous" "liberal"
- Region of origin: England, see France for parallel surnames

Other names
- Variant forms: Lardge, Lurge, Larg, le Large, de Large

Large is an English surname, with variants including Lardge and Lurge. Its meaning is variable, though it may derive from the Norman French adjective, large (meaning "generous" or "big" [as in, "that's big of you", meaning generous, as well as large in size]), as it is found in the surname "le Large" in English records dating back as far as the 13th century. Harrison's work on English surnames gives the following: "Large (adjectival: French, Latin) Big; Generous [Middle English Old French large; Latin larg-us, -a, [meaning] abundant, liberal]"

He gives an early citation for the name: Austin Belz from the Hundred Rolls, a reference dating to 1273.

He also provides a quotation showing the word in its older sense of generous, full, liberal or ample in its literary context:

So large of yift [gift] and free was she (from Chaucer's Romance of the Rose I168)

Another variant surname, "de Large", appears to be continental European rather than English in origin.

Henry Brougham Guppy's survey circa 1881, based on local British directories, places Large as a surname local to North Wiltshire, and considers it to have particular prevalence among yeoman farmers.(Guppy, 1890)

According to the International Genealogical Index, the surname is also found in many other English counties; in Ireland, Scotland, Wales and other English language countries; in France and Germany, and, more rarely, in the Scandinavian countries. Large is also found in Latin America countries such as Colombia where all families surnamed Large are related.

People with the name Large, or one of its variants, include:

== People ==
- Sir Andrew Large (born 1942), British, Monetary Policy Committee member
- Bonnie Large (born 1952), American, Playboy model
- Brian Large (1937–2026), British opera video director
- Donald "Lofty" Large (1930–2006), British soldier and author
- Eddie Large (1941–2020), British comedian
- Ernest Charles Large (1902–1976), English mycologist, phytopathologist, and novelist
- Hayden Large (born 2002), American football player
- John Large (1943–2018), British engineer
- Josaphat-Robert Large (1942–2017), Haitian-American poet
- Leslie Large (1864–1896), English vegetarianism activist
- Rob Large (born 1981), English cricketer
- Robert Large (died 1441), English, Lord Mayor of London (1439–1440) and apprentice master of William Caxton, England's first printer
- Stephen Large, English musician
- Storm Large (born 1969), American singer
- William Large (1878–1964), Australian politician

=== Variants ===
- Robert C. De Large (1842–1874), American politician
