= The Story of Tracy Beaker (franchise) =

British children's drama media franchise

- Created by: Jacqueline Wilson
- Owner: BBC

Print publications
- Book(s): The Story of Tracy Beaker (1991); The Dare Game (2000); Starring Tracy Beaker (2006); Tracy Beaker's Thumping Heart (2009); Ask Tracy Beaker and Friends (2010); My Mum Tracy Beaker (2018); We are The Beaker Girls (2019)
- Magazine(s): Totally Tracy Beaker; The Story of Tracy Beaker: The DVD Collection

Films and television
- Television series: The Story of Tracy Beaker (2002–2005); Tracy Beaker Returns (2010–2012); The Dumping Ground (2013–present); My Mum Tracy Beaker (2021); The Beaker Girls (2021–2023)
- Television special(s): Tracy Beaker Parties with Pudsey (2004); Children's Party at the Palace (2006)
- Television film(s): Tracy Beaker: The Movie of Me (2004)

Theatrical presentations
- Musical(s): Tracy Beaker Gets Real

Official website
- Jacqueline Wilson website; The Story of Tracy Beaker website; Tracy Beaker Returns website; The Dumping Ground website

The Story of Tracy Beaker is a long running, award-winning British children's media franchise that began with The Story of Tracy Beaker first published on 14 February 1991. Since then the book has spawned five sequels and inspired a television franchise of which consists of nearly 400 episodes of the course of over twenty years and 5 shows including: The Story of Tracy Beaker, Tracy Beaker Returns and The Dumping Ground. The franchise explores the challenges faced by the residents of "the DG" as it is referred to by the residents and their numerous care/social workers, their relationships with their families and each other and how they overcome those challenges. Some of the topics covered in the franchise include abandonment, neglect, abuse, relationships, growing up, bullying, change, loss, racism, homelessness, runaways etc. With characters such as Jody Jackson (Kia Pegg), Elektra (Jessica Revell), Mike Milligan (Connor Bryne), Alex Walker (Connor Lawson) and Tracy Beaker herself (Dani Harmer) among many others becoming fan favourites and main stays in the ongoing narrative. Residents continue to mention older ones and pass down items from generation to generation, keeping the shows connected and maintaining the extensive lore of the franchise while also finding new ways to evolve and explore new storylines within and outside of the care system. The franchise is also recognisable as having produced award-winning actors and actresses such as Amy-Leigh Hickman (who portrayed Carmen) and Mia McKenna-Bruce (who portrayed Tee) among others.

Story of Tracy Beaker merchandise has also been released.

== Publications ==
The Story of Tracy Beaker franchise currently has seven books: The Story of Tracy Beaker, The Dare Game (reissued in 2018 as I Dare You, Tracy Beaker), Starring Tracy Beaker, My Mum Tracy Beaker, We Are the Beaker Girls, Tracy Beaker's Thumping Heart and Ask Tracy Beaker and Friends.

The Story of Tracy Beaker also had two magazine collections: Totally Tracy Beaker came with free art and craft supplies, which the reader collected, and the second magazine, The Story of Tracy Beaker: The DVD Collection, came with a DVD with episodes from the series and the reader would eventually have all five series.

== Television ==
Overview of The Story of Tracy Beaker TV series
Series	Season	Episodes		Originally released		
Series	Season	Episodes		First released	Last released	Network
The Story of Tracy Beaker	1	26		8 January 2002	4 April 2002	CBBC
The Story of Tracy Beaker	2	26		7 January 2003	3 April 2003	CBBC
The Story of Tracy Beaker	3	26		25 September 2003	1 April 2004	CBBC
The Story of Tracy Beaker	TV Film			21 February 2004		CBBC
The Story of Tracy Beaker	4	22		7 October 2004	5 April 2005	CBBC
The Story of Tracy Beaker	5	20		28 November 2005	9 December 2005	CBBC
Tracy Beaker Returns	1	13		8 January 2010	26 March 2010	CBBC
Tracy Beaker Returns	2	13		7 January 2011	25 March 2011	CBBC
Tracy Beaker Returns	3	13		6 January 2012	23 March 2012	CBBC
The Dumping Ground	1	13		4 January 2013	15 March 2013	CBBC
The Dumping Ground	2	13		10 January 2014	28 March 2014	CBBC
The Dumping Ground	3	20	10	16 January 2015	13 March 2015	CBBC
The Dumping Ground	3	20	10	6 October 2015	8 December 2015	CBBC
The Dumping Ground	4	20	10	29 January 2016	25 March 2016	CBBC
The Dumping Ground	4	20	10	30 September 2016	2 December 2016	CBBC
The Dumping Ground	5	22	12	20 January 2017	31 March 2017	CBBC
The Dumping Ground	5	22	10	13 October 2017	15 December 2017	CBBC
The Dumping Ground	6	24	12	12 January 2018	30 March 2018	CBBC
The Dumping Ground	6	24	12	21 September 2018	7 December 2018	CBBC
The Dumping Ground	7	24	12	4 January 2019	15 March 2019	CBBC
The Dumping Ground	7	24	12	27 September 2019	6 December 2019	CBBC
The Dumping Ground	8	24	12	10 January 2020	27 March 2020	CBBC
The Dumping Ground	8	24	12	25 September 2020	5 February 2021	CBBC
The Dumping Ground	9	20	10	11 June 2021	13 August 2021	CBBC
The Dumping Ground	9	20	10	21 January 2022	25 March 2022	CBBC
The Dumping Ground	10	20	10	30 September 2022	2 December 2022	CBBC
The Dumping Ground	10	20	10	21 April 2023	23 June 2023	CBBC
The Dumping Ground	11	10		26 January 2024	22 March 2024	CBBC
The Dumping Ground	12	8		18 October 2024	6 December 2024	CBBC
The Dumping Ground	13	10		17 January 2025	21 March 2025	CBBC
The Dumping Ground	14	10		23 January 2026	27 March 2026	
My Mum Tracy Beaker	1	3		12 February 2021	14 February 2021	
The Beaker Girls	1	5		13 December 2021	17 December 2021	
The Beaker Girls	2	12		13 January 2023	31 March 2023	

The BBC adapted the book for television and The Story of Tracy Beaker ran for five series on CBBC from 8 January 2002 to 9 December 2005, featuring Dani Harmer as Tracy Beaker. In 2009, a sequel series to The Story of Tracy Beaker was announced, titled Beaker's Back but eventually retitled Tracy Beaker Returns. This series aired on CBBC for three series, from 8 January 2010 to 23 March 2012. In 2012, a spin-off series titled The Dumping Ground was announced, but without Harmer, as the latter chose to quit her role as Tracy. The Dumping Ground has aired on CBBC since 4 January 2013 and is still going; it is currently in its thirteenth series.

On 21 February 2004, Tracy Beaker: The Movie of Me aired on CBBC. For Children In Need that year, a The Story of Tracy Beaker special aired on CBBC titled Tracy Beaker Parties with Pudsey. Tracy Beaker Returns had one spin-off, Tracy Beaker Survival Files, which aired for one series from 16 December 2011 to 6 January 2012. The Dumping Ground has had five spin-offs: The Dumping Ground Survival Files aired for two series from 6 January to 12 December 2014; a webisode miniseries, Liam's Story, aired from 17 January to 14 March 2018, and the series aired as a full episode on CBBC on 23 March 2014; a five-part miniseries, The Dumping Ground Dish Up, aired in November 2015; and The Dumping Ground: I'm..., another webisode series in which young people and staff describe living and working in care, aired for two series from 25 January 2016 to 9 February 2017. A five-part mini-webisode series, Sasha's Contact Meetings, was released on 6 April 2018.

== Musicals ==
In 2006, The Story of Tracy Beaker was adapted into a musical, featuring Sarah Churm as Tracy Beaker. Suzie McGrath played Justine Littlewood; Jessica Martin played Tracy's mum and Louise; Alice Redmond played Tracy's foster mother, Cam; Gemma Page played social worker Elaine; and Andy Steed played Peter.
