= Montanna Thompson =

English actress (born 1988

- Born: Montanna Thompson
- Occupation: Actress
- Years active: 1998–present
- Known for: Role of Justine Littlewood in The Story of Tracy Beaker (franchise)

Montanna Thompson is an English actress. She is known for her role as Justine Littlewood in the CBBC children's series The Story of Tracy Beaker (2002–2006). Thompson has reprised her role as Justine in Tracy Beaker Returns (2012), My Mum Tracy Beaker (2021) and The Beaker Girls (2021–2023).

== Career ==
Thompson's first television appearance was in 1998, in the BBC mini-series Close Relations, in which she played the role of Allegra. In 2000, she went on to appear in The Queen's Nose, in which she appeared as Emily, a foster home resident.

In 2002, Thompson began appearing as Justine Littlewood in the CBBC series The Story of Tracy Beaker, based on the Jacqueline Wilson book of the same name. Justine was introduced in the first episode as the arch-enemy of the title character, Tracy Beaker (Dani Harmer). In 2012, Thompson reprised her role as Justine Littlewood in Tracy Beaker Returns. Thompson reprised her role once again in the 2021 series My Mum Tracy Beaker.

== Filmography ==
Year	Title	Role	Notes
1998	Close Relations	Allegra	TV mini-series
2000	The Queen's Nose	Emily	5 episodes
2002–2005	The Story of Tracy Beaker	Justine Littlewood	Main role
2004	Tracy Beaker's Movie of Me	Justine Littlewood	Television film
2004	Tracy Beaker Parties with Pudsey	Justine Littlewood	Children in Need special
2005	Casualty	Jessica Daw	2 episodes
2005	Peaches Geldof: The Teenage Mind	Girl	TV documentary
2006	Children's Party At The Palace	Justine Littlewood	Television special
2006	Doctors	Karen Drummond	Episode: "Kiss Goodbye"
2006	Sugar Rush	Anabelle	2 episodes
2007	The Last Detective	Manda	Episode: "Dangerous Liaisons"
2009	The Bill	Misti Clements	Episode: "Peer Pressure"
2012	Tracy Beaker Returns	Justine Littlewood	Episode: "Justine Littlewood Returns"
2013	Dates	Ellie	Episode: "David & Ellie"
2015	The Trials of Jimmy Rose	Ellie Rose	TV mini-series; 3 episodes
2016	Gangster Kittens	Angel	Film
2017	Kill or be Killed	Evie Kosko	Film
2021	My Mum Tracy Beaker	Justine Littlewood	Main role
2021–2023	The Beaker Girls	Justine Littlewood	Recurring role
