= Emma Reeves =

Welsh screenwriter and playwright

Emma Jane Reeves is a Welsh screenwriter and playwright, best known for her extensive work in children's television series such as the Tracy Beaker franchise. She is currently Chair of the Writers' Guild of Great Britain.

== Early life and education ==
Reeves grew up in Wrexham. She gained a First Class degree in English from Magdalen College, Oxford and an MA in creative writing from the University of East Anglia.

== Career ==
Reeves has written extensively for theatre, including shows based on material she would also work on in television, such as Hetty Feather and The Worst Witch, as well as adaptations of Cool Hand Luke and Little Women. In 2005, she moved into television, gaining her first credit on BBC One's Doctors. She became a prolific children's writer following working on The Story of Tracy Beaker, writing for series like Half Moon Investigations, Chuggington and Young Dracula. She would return to the Tracy Beaker franchise several times, writing for Tracy Beaker Returns, spin-off The Dumping Ground and in 2021, My Mum Tracy Beaker. This was followed by The Beaker Girls that same year.

In 2015, she co-created with David Chikwe the CBBC science-fiction series Eve. It starred Poppy Lee Friar and follows the adventures of a gynoid, a female android, named Eve (also known as Project Eternity) living with a family in suburbia, trying to make sense of human life as a teenage girl. It concluded on 14 December 2016 with an hour-long episode, which was later split into two parts when it was repeated in January 2017. Reeves developed and wrote a new adaptation of The Worst Witch, which ran for four series between 2017 and 2020. She would win 'Best British Children's Television' at the British Screenwriters' Awards for her work. In 2019, she helmed a sequel-reboot of The Demon Headmaster for CBBC. While well received, it was cancelled due to the COVID-19 pandemic. Reeves returned to adult drama in 2024, writing on the period drama The Hardacres. In 2025 she adapted the Gifted series of novels by Marilyn Kaye into the television series Gifted for Black Camel Pictures and Media Valley which was then released by the BBC.

Reeves has written audio plays for the Big Finish Doctor Who ranges, starting with Torchwood: Forgotten Lives in 2015. She also wrote for the spin-offs The Diary of River Song and The New Adventures of Bernice Summerfield . Outside of the UK, Reeves co-wrote the Lifetime Television movie The Murder of Princess Diana.
