= Tracy Beaker =

Fictional character from the Tracy Beaker franchise

- The Story of Tracy Beaker (franchise) character
- Dani Harmer as Tracy Beaker in My Mum Tracy Beaker
- First appearance: Literature: The Story of Tracy Beaker (1991); Television: "Tracy Returns" (2002)
- Last appearance: Literature: We Are the Beaker Girls (2019); Television: "The Magician's Oath" (2025)
- Created by: Jacqueline Wilson
- Portrayed by: Dani Harmer (television); Sarah Churm (stage)

In-universe information
- Occupation: Student; Author; Careworker; Waitress; Dog walker; Shop manager
- Children: Jess Beaker
- Relatives: Carly Beaker (mother); Cam Lawson (adoptive mother); Gary (adoptive father); Ted (foster father); Julie (foster mother); Lily Kettle (foster sister); Penelope Lawson (adoptive grandmother)

Tracy Beaker is a fictional character, the lead (and longest-serving) character of the Tracy Beaker franchise. After first appearing as the main character in Jacqueline Wilson's 1991 book The Story of Tracy Beaker, she appeared in the children's television drama of the same name, portrayed by Dani Harmer, and its sequel series Tracy Beaker Returns, as well as numerous spin-offs, Jacqueline Wilson books, a play and a video game. Harmer reprised her role as Tracy in the 2021 television series My Mum Tracy Beaker followed by The Beaker Girls.

In her first appearances in the Tracy Beaker books and in the television series The Story of Tracy Beaker, Tracy lives in foster care at a care home referred to as "The Dumping Ground", or the D.G. She has a wild imagination and regularly breaks the rules. As such, She is considered a bad role-model by parents. In Tracy Beaker Returns, She works as a care worker at the Dumping Ground. She was mentioned a number of Times in the spin-off The Dumping Ground, before making a guest appearance in two episodes of the sixth series. The Tracy Beaker books were the most-loaned books from public libraries in the United Kingdom between 2000 and 2010. She last appeared in 2025. She was the only main character to appear in every Tracy Beaker spin-off series.

== Biography ==
"Tracy is so outrageous. It's great to invent somebody who is far bolder than you would ever be yourself. I do think she's got an excuse for bad behaviour, though, because she's had a really tough life. If Tracy didn't have this total determination to survive and get her own back on people, she would be an extra-specially sad soul."

— Jacqueline Wilson

Tracy Beaker is introduced as a ten-year-old girl living in a children's residential care home nicknamed the "Dumping Ground". The nickname is explained in The Story of Tracy Beaker as being where children in care are "dumped" when they are "past their sell-by date." She has been described as a modern heroine with regular looks and curly brown hair. It is revealed that she has been placed in care not because she is an orphan but because her mother could not look after her. Tracy imagines that her mother is a Hollywood star who will collect her one day. Carly Beaker, who is Tracy's mother, really is a film star but does stunts, as revealed in Tracy Beaker's Movie of Me. Tracy's personality has been described as bossy and rebellious, while still being likeable and creative. She has been estranged from her mother for a long period and regularly disagrees with the staff and children at the Dumping Ground. On top of this Tracy has been rejected by two sets of foster parents, once because the couple looking after her were about to have a baby and could not keep Tracy with them, much to her distress.

== Adaptations ==
Originally introduced in the book The Story of Tracy Beaker, to date the character has appeared in four further books, The Dare Game, Starring Tracy Beaker, My Mum Tracy Beaker and We Are the Beaker Girls. She has also appeared in Red Nose Day special called Tracy Beaker's Thumping Heart.

In 2002, the BBC adapted the book into a children's television drama series based on the books, The Story of Tracy Beaker, starring Dani Harmer as Tracy. The program ran for five series on CBBC until 2006 and included a one-off feature-length movie, Tracy Beaker's Movie of Me. Harmer first took on the role at the age of 12 and has maintained it for 20 years. She appeared in the TV special for Her Majesty the Queen's 80th Birthday and a charity miniseries, Parties with Pudsey. The character returned for an additional three series of Tracy Beaker Returns until 2012, in which an adult Tracy Beaker helps a new generation of kids at the Dumping Ground.

The character has also appeared in a stage adaptation of the book, Tracy Beaker Gets Real, starring Sarah Churm as Tracy. It was written by Mary Morris, one of the writers of the TV series. Like the television series, the set used elements of cartoon themes, similar to the illustrations in the books.

In 2009, Tracy Beaker became a video game character in Tracy Beaker: The Game on Nintendo DS and PC. The game, described as "bookish", involves reading large portions of text to make choices for the character.

== Television appearances ==
=== The Story of Tracy Beaker ===
==== Series 1 (2002) ====
Tracy returns to the Dumping Ground after being kicked out of Ted and Julie's house because they were expecting a new baby, and Tracy has a bad history with babies. She angrily packs her things to leave but is upset to see her best friend Louise (Chelsie Padley) being friends with Justine Littlewood (Montanna Thompson). Tracy becomes Justine's worst enemy after discovering that Justine has been given her old bedroom while Tracy was away being fostered. She breaks Justine's alarm clock (by sneaking into her room) that her dad got for her. In an attempt to escape from the Dumping Ground, she meets her new friend, Ben Batambuze, who says he lives on the streets. As they chat, they become instant friends and walk together happily along the streets. Tracy is impressed with the large amounts of chocolate Ben gives her.

Tracy meets Cam Lawson (Lisa Coleman), a struggling author, as there is not much activity in the Dumping Ground and Tracy is extremely excited, but is upset when Justine has to dampen her spirits and wears makeup, from Adele, to impress her, with disastrous results. She does this by bribing her. Since she is an author and Tracy loves writing, she wants to make a first good impression on her and ends up having a fight with Justine, as she provoked her, making them embarrassed as Cam watches the whole thing. Cam, who has still not decided whether or not to foster her, needs more time to think about the deed and every time Tracy hears this it antagonizes her. Banned from phoning her, Tracy enlists Ben's help to go to see Cam in person. When they arrive at her flat, Cam is out, so Tracy and Ben rearrange the furniture, play music and eat chocolate. When Cam gets home, she is furious and takes Tracy back. Tracy later apologies for breaking into her flat, and Cam says that she is still considering fostering her. Cam asks Tracy to move in with her. Tracy agrees, packs straight away and has a lovely goodbye from all the staff and children.

==== Series 2 (2003) ====
Tracy lands back at the Dumping Ground after setting fire to Cam's kitchen. After this incident, Tracy refuses to talk to Cam, so Elaine (Nisha Nayar) resolves to get them talking with a series of role-play and trust exercises. Whilst Elaine briefly leaves the room, Tracy and Cam sneak off and Tracy decides to show Cam what it is like to 'be her', which culminates in a disappearance at the shops to indicate how she felt when Cam left her. As the episode ends, their friendship is back on track. Tracy meets Ben's Aunt and Uncle, Kate and Jasper, who decide that they want to foster her. Tracy is initially ecstatic about this, only to learn that living with Kate and Jasper would mean moving to Scotland – far away from the DG, her best friend Ben and of course, Cam. In the end Tracy decides to go to Scotland, but only for a holiday.

==== Series 3 (2003–2004) ====
Tracy is still living in the DG but gets worried when she hears that new head care worker Shelley Appleton (Nicola Reynolds) is considering moving her to a different care home. To make matters worse, Cam is leaving for New York. Fortunately, after the other kids form an alliance to all leave if Tracy does, Shelley postpones the idea. She later makes friends with new arrival Jackie Hopper, who makes a dash for the door at every opportunity, whom Tracy convinces to stay at the Dumping Ground for a while.

==== Series 4 (2004–2005) ====
Tracy is back and living with Cam, and just around the corner at the new location of the Dumping Ground is the arrival of the Wellards. They guarantee it will not be a smooth move. But Tracy Beaker's taken back to save the day. Whilst in the Dumping Ground, it is Bouncer's birthday and he is leaving, Tracy is living with Cam and tries to set straight the situation at the DG. Tracy decides it's time to meet Cam's mother, her adoptive grandmother, and surprisingly likes her, which she did not expect. Tracy is still living with Cam. Tracy spends the shopping money for things she wants like turkey nuggets and fizzy drinks. One time, Tracy wakes up and she is back at the care-home, and everyone seems to be singing and not enjoying themselves and suddenly it becomes like the West End musical, Chicago. Crash, Jackie and Tracy have a master plan as they take pranks from the nasty Wellards. But Chantal is feeling rather emotional over Jackie's feelings for her. Tracy helps when Bouncer has feelings over care worker Jane.

==== Series 5 (2005–2006) ====
The first few episodes of the fifth series do not feature Tracy, as she is on holiday with Cam in Egypt. She contacts the DG daily. However, she returns to the care home afterwards, when Cam's new boyfriend Gary moves in with them. Most episodes do not include Tracy as Dani Harmer (who plays Tracy) was working on another project at the same time as this series. Tracy Beaker makes a shock return to the Dumping Ground. Tracy has decided that she cannot live with Cam anymore because Cam wants her new boyfriend Gary to move in with them. Tracy is forced to think about her future, so she agrees to spend time with Cam and Gary, and, to her surprise, they get on very well, until Cam drops the bombshell that they are getting married – this is way too much for Tracy to handle and she wants nothing to do with the 'sordid' affair. Cam and Gary get married, and Tracy only manages to make it thanks to Crash and Jackie. In the end, Cam and Gary tell Tracy they are going to adopt her.

==== Children's Party at the Palace (2006) ====
Tracy, alongside Justine Littlewood and Crash Watkins, appear in Elizabeth II's 80th birthday special.

=== Tracy Beaker Returns ===
==== Series 1 (2010) ====
Four years later, she has written an autobiography, however, she used Cam's credit card to publish it. Cam notifies the credit card company, and the police soon catch on. Tracy is arrested and interviewed before being locked up, where it was revealed that Cam's marriage with Gary did not work, with Tracy stating that they do not talk about him. The reason why is still unknown. She is released when Cam drops the charges, on condition that she pays her back and that she helps write a column for the newspaper. When she returns home, she hears some angry sounding messages from Cam, and she runs away from home. She ends up in the Dumping Ground and Mike allows her to stay the night. The next day she asks Mike for a job, and he lets her become an assistant care worker. However, she does not do a good job, always being late and breaking her promises to the kids. When she is told that she might be fired, she quits and leaves. With the help of the kids, she gets her job back. After that, she has a job filled with excitement almost every day and she becomes closer to the kids, particularly Lily and Toby because of their problems. Some of her adventures as a care worker include her disastrous first night shift at the Dumping Ground, her attempt to get Lily back with Poppy and Rosie and her attempt of finding out about stolen goods in Sapphire's room. In the last episode of the first series, Tracy is offered a job for a newspaper in London, and she has to write an article about life in care. Everyone refuses to help at first, but eventually they decide to help her. Tracy is given the job, but she turns it down, saying that she would much rather stay at the Dumping Ground.

==== Series 2 (2011) ====
Tracy learns that the council are going to shut down the Dumping Ground and so she climbs onto the roof and starts a protest. The protest ends in disaster, however, as Tracy made Lily climb onto the roof and she does not moves with the Perrys and end up with Tracy and Cam. As a result, the Dumping Ground is briefly blue, but re-Beaker-ised thanks to the news reports about the accident. Mike is almost sacked because of the protest, but he is thankfully let in. Lily is fostered by Cam after the accident, and Tracy starts to feel jealous as it has always just been her and Cam living together. After briefly getting a second job at a cafe to avoid spending time at home, Tracy finally accepts having Lily as a sister and they start to bond even more. After many more adventures at the Dumping Ground, including being made to dress up as a giant sausage with Sapphire and having to be a team leader during a weekend in the countryside, Tracy finally loses Lily as a sister when she decides to live with her dad once again. When Cam leaves for New York, Tracy starts having panic attacks at home, finally resulting in a big one in front of the kids.

==== Series 3 (2012) ====
Tracy deals with cynical Burnywood care worker Dennis Stokle, tries to get shy, mousy Kitty out of her shell despite being warned of her unpredictable behavior resulting in Tracy being injured badly, and helping Lily to try to help her to get Rosie and Poppy with their dad, Steve Kettle. In episode 7, Tracy has difficulty at the Dumping Ground when Justine Littlewood returns. Later in the episode, Justine announced that she is getting married with a man called Charlie. (Episode 12). Tracy and Rick show Justine why this is a bad idea. In the final episode of Tracy Beaker Returns, Tracy decides to leave DG because she becomes a fully qualified care worker in a different care home. She is replaced with Melanie, who makes Tracy jealous because on Tracy's last day of working at the DG she does everything better than Tracy does including saving Jody Jackson's life after she has an allergic reaction. Tracy sleeps overnight at the DG then the next morning says goodbye to Mike and leaves for good. but still has cameos in the main series.

=== The Dumping Ground ===
==== Series 4 (2016) ====
In episode 19, it is revealed that at some point Tracy gave Tee a Peter Pan book. With Tee leaving to live in a flat with Carmen, she passes the book down to her roommate, Sasha Bellman, which included a message written inside saying “We are all lost boys when we arrive at the Dumping Ground. But when we leave, we are found again” - Tracy Beaker. So Tee passes the book down to Sasha, and tells her to the same when she leaves and is “found”.

==== Series 5 (2017) ====
When Ashdene Ridge was threatened with closure, it is mentioned that Tracy donated £500 to the fundraiser set up by Tee to help save the care home.

==== Series 6 (2018) ====
After leaving her job as a care worker at Elm Tree House, Tracy is mentioned a few occasions throughout The Dumping Ground. It is not until the sixth series of the show where she makes a special guest appearance in the series finale going to her long serving care worker, Mike Milligan's wedding, as the best man. She appears in episode 23 & 24.

==== Series 7 (2019) ====
While Tracy does not make a physical appearance, her voice can be heard at the end of the series 7 finale as Mike leaves Ashdene Ridge for the last time, where he imagines hearing Tracy telling him to “bog off”.

==== Series 13 (2025) ====
Tracy makes a very brief guest appearance in episode 6, as one of the customers for a car wash run by a few of the residents of Porters Lodge (Harmony, Izzy, Jimi and Erin).

=== My Mum Tracy Beaker ===
My Mum Tracy Beaker premiered on CBBC on 12 February 2021. The series follows on from the events of its predecessors, The Story of Tracy Beaker, Tracy Beaker Returns and The Dumping Ground. Harmer reprised her role as Tracy Beaker, as well as Montanna Thompson returning to play Tracy's arch-nemesis Justine Littlewood, Lisa Coleman as Tracy's adoptive mother Cam Lawson, and Ruth Gemmell as Tracy's biological mother Carly Beaker. New characters joining the new series include Emma Davies as Tracy's daughter Jess, Jordan Duvigneau as Tracy's boyfriend Sean Godfrey, Noah Leacock as Tyrone and Danielle Henry as Jess' teacher Miss Mary Oliver.

== Reception ==
Similar to Wilson's other characters, Tracy Beaker is a child from a difficult background, dealing with her issues in a cynical manner and with much yelling. Her fanbase is primarily girls between 8 and 14, as 90% of those who turn up to Jacqueline Wilson's book signings are in that group. However, the books are also on reading lists for schools, so boys will be involved in the classroom. The Story of Tracy Beaker has been UK libraries' most-loaned book between 2000 and 2010.

In its description of Tracy, an article for the Herald Scotland states: "Though her life is bleak, Tracy is funny, imaginative, articulate and hopeful, like all Wilson's heroines." A Liverpool Echo article describes Tracy as "a heroine – a cult character who could be played by any actress."
