= List of The Story of Tracy Beaker episodes =

The Story of Tracy Beaker (also known as Tracy Beaker or TSOTB) is a British television programme adapted from the book of the same name by Jacqueline Wilson. It ran on CBBC for five series, from 2002 to 2005 and also contained a feature-length episode, Tracy Beaker's Movie of Me, broadcast in 2004, as well as a week of interactive episodes for Children in Need. The theme song was written and performed by Keisha White. All of the five series have been released on DVD and the entire first series had been made available on Netflix, but for unknown reasons it was later removed. Series 1–3 has been added onto Amazon Prime.

== Series overview ==
Series	Episodes	Originally released	
Series	Episodes	First released	Last released
1	26	8 January 2002	4 April 2002
2	26	7 January 2003	3 April 2003
3	26	25 September 2003	1 April 2004
Television film		21 February 2004	
4	22	7 October 2004	5 April 2005
5	20	28 November 2005	9 December 2005

== Episodes ==
=== Series 1 (2002) ===
No. in series	Title	Directed by	Written by	Original release date	Prod. code
1	"Tracy Returns"	Susan Tully	Elly Brewer	8 January 2002	1.1
2	"Dares"	David Skynner	Elly Brewer	10 January 2002	1.2
3	"Sneaking in Ben"	Susan Tully	Andy Walker	15 January 2002	1.3
4	"Cam's First Visit"	Susan Tully	Elly Brewer	17 January 2002	1.4
5	"Child of the Week"	Susan Tully	Elly Brewer	22 January 2002	1.5
6	"The Truth is Revealed"	Susan Tully	Carol Russell	24 January 2002	1.6
7	"Never Ever Wanna See Him Again"	Susan Tully	Mary Morris	29 January 2002	1.7
8	"The 1000 Words About Tracy"	Susan Tully	Arnold Evans	31 January 2002	1.8
9	"Bad Peter"	Susan Tully	Mary Morris	7 February 2002	1.9
10	"Cam's Place"	Susan Tully	Andy Walker	12 February 2002	1.10
11	"Dumping Ground Virus"	David Skynner	Elly Brewer	14 February 2002	1.11
12	"Justine's Telly"	Susan Tully	Elly Brewer	19 February 2002	1.12
13	"Tracy and Cam Row"	Susan Tully	Elly Brewer	21 February 2002	1.13
14	"Sleepover"	David Skynner	Mary Morris	26 February 2002	1.14
15	"Parent's Evening"	Susan Tully	Laura Summers	28 February 2002	1.15
16	"The Postcard"	Susan Tully	Roger Griffiths	5 March 2002	1.16
17	"Where’s the Work"	David Skynner	Arnold Evans	12 March 2002	1.17
18	"Helpful Tracy"	David Skynner	Mary Morris	19 March 2002	1.18
19	"New Girl"	David Skynner	Laura Summers	14 March 2002	1.19
20	"Treasure Hunt"	David Skynner	Laura Summers	5 February 2002	1.20
21	"Romance"	David Skynner	Elly Brewer	7 March 2002	1.21
22	"Temporary Care Worker"	David Skynner	Othniel Smith	21 March 2002	1.22
23	"Cut the Weed"	David Skynner	Graham Alborough	26 March 2002	1.23
24	"Need Armbands"	David Skynner	Laura Summers	28 March 2002	1.24
25	"Miss You"	David Skynner	Mary Morris	2 April 2002	1.25
26	"The End!"	David Skynner	Elly Brewer	4 April 2002	1.26

=== Series 2 (2003) ===
No. in series	Title	Directed by	Written by	Original release date	Prod. code
1	"Back & Bad"	Delyth Thomas	Mary Morris	7 January 2003	2.1
2	"Bedsit"	Joss Agnew	Laura Summers	9 January 2003	2.2
3	"Brothers"	Joss Agnew	Ian Carney	14 January 2003	2.3
4	"Action Therapy"	Delyth Thomas	Gary Parker	16 January 2003	2.4
5	"Alien"	Joss Agnew	Rob Gittins	21 January 2003	2.5
6	"Doggie"	Delyth Thomas	Tracy Brabin	23 January 2003	2.6
7	"Bad Girls"	Delyth Thomas	Othniel Smith	28 January 2003	2.7
8	"Big Fight"	Delyth Thomas	Andy Walker	30 January 2003	2.8
9	"Hollywood"	Joss Agnew	Sam Bain & Jesse Armstrong	4 February 2003	2.9
10	"Home Truths"	Delyth Thomas	Mary Morris	6 February 2003	2.10
11	"Day Trip"	Joss Agnew	Gary Parker	11 February 2003	2.11
12	"Christmas"	Delyth Thomas	Laura Summers	13 February 2003	2.12
13	"Takeover"	Delyth Thomas	Sam Bain & Jesse Armstrong	18 February 2003	2.13
14	"Work"	Joss Agnew	Lucy Flannery	20 February 2003	2.14
15	"Bridesmaid"	Joss Agnew	Mary Morris	25 February 2003	2.15
16	"Quiz"	Delyth Thomas	Rob Gittins & Gary Parker	27 February 2003	2.16
17	"Two-Timing Adele"	Delyth Thomas	Abigail Abben Mensah	4 March 2003	2.17
18	"Secrets and Lies"	Joss Agnew	Othniel Smith	6 March 2003	2.18
19	"Music"	Joss Agnew	Laura Summers	11 March 2003	2.19
20	"Family Tree"	Delyth Thomas	Andy Walker	13 March 2003	2.20
21	"Ben's Party"	Joss Agnew	Laura Summers	18 March 2003	2.21
22	"Get Lost"	Joss Agnew	Mary Morris	20 March 2003	2.22
23	"The Long Goodbye"	Delyth Thomas	Othniel Smith	25 March 2003	2.23
24	"Genius at Work"	Delyth Thomas	Othniel Smith	27 March 2003	2.24
25	"Nathan's Assessment"	Delyth Thomas	Laura Summers	1 April 2003	2.25
26	"Home and Hosed"	Joss Agnew	Mary Morris	3 April 2003	2.26

=== Series 3 (2003–2004) ===
No. in series	Title	Directed by	Written by	Original release date	Prod. code
1	"Leavin' on a Jet Plane"	Delyth Thomas	Mary Morris	25 September 2003	3.1
2	"Supernatural Shelley"	Delyth Thomas	Laura Summers	2 October 2003	3.2
3	"Jackie"	Delyth Thomas	Gary Parker	9 October 2003	3.3
4	"Free Louise"	Delyth Thomas	Laura Summers	16 October 2003	3.4
5	"The Bygraves"	Delyth Thomas	Gary Parker	23 October 2003	3.5
6	"Down with School"	Delyth Thomas	Laura Summers	30 October 2003	3.6
7	"Crashed and Thrashed"	Delyth Thomas	Mary Morris	6 November 2003	3.7
8	"No-one Quite Like Grandpa"	Delyth Thomas	Othniel Smith	13 November 2003	3.8
9	"Down to Earth"	Joss Agnew	Dan Anthony	20 November 2003	3.9
10	"Nothing Happens Here"	Joss Agnew	Mary Morris	27 November 2003	3.10
11	"The Beaker Club"	Joss Agnew	Simon Nicholson	4 December 2003	3.11
12	"Power Cut"	Joss Agnew	Abigail Abben Mensah	11 December 2003	3.12
13	"Just Desserts"	Joss Agnew	Othniel Smith	18 December 2003	3.13
14	"Mind Your Own Business"	Joss Agnew	Holly Lyons	8 January 2004	3.14
15	"I Am Not In Love"	Joss Agnew	Holly Lyons	15 January 2004	3.15
16	"Time Capsule"	Joss Agnew	Marvin Close	22 January 2004	3.16
17	"Football Trial"	Joss Agnew	Andy Walker	29 January 2004	3.17
18	"We Are Family"	Joss Agnew	Tracy Brabin	5 February 2004	3.18
19	"Be Prepared"	Laurence Wilson	Laura Summers	12 February 2004	3.19
20	"Sufia the Silent"	Laurence Wilson	Ariane Sherine	19 February 2004	3.20
21	"Babies Suck!"	Laurence Wilson	Mary Morris	26 February 2004	3.21
22	"Exploited"	Laurence Wilson	Marvin Close	4 March 2004	3.22
23	"Be Quiet"	Laurence Wilson	Dan Anthony	11 March 2004	3.23
24	"Dad Trouble"	Laurence Wilson	Gary Parker	18 March 2004	3.24
25	"The Big Race"	Laurence Wilson	Gary Parker	25 March 2004	3.25
26	"Good as Gold"	Laurence Wilson	Mary Morris	1 April 2004	3.26

=== Television film (2004) ===
Title	Directed by	Written by	Original release date
Tracy Beaker: The Movie of Me	Joss Agnew	Mary Morris	21 February 2004

=== Series 4 (2004–2005) ===
No. in series	Title	Directed by	Written by	Original release date	Prod. code
1	"Return to Sender"	Delyth Thomas	Mary Morris	7 October 2004	4.1
2	"Bouncer vs. Lol"	Delyth Thomas	Gary Lawson & John Phelps	14 October 2004	4.2
3	"In With The Wellards"	Delyth Thomas	Simon Nicholson	21 October 2004	4.3
4	"Meet The Parent"	Delyth Thomas & Keith Washington	Emma Reeves	28 October 2004	4.4
5	"Single White Female"	Delyth Thomas	Emma Kennedy	4 November 2004	4.5
6	"Can't Buy Me Love"	Delyth Thomas & Keith Washington	Laura Summers	11 November 2004	4.6
7	"Life Is a Cabaret"	Delyth Thomas	Laura Summers	24 November 2004	4.7
8	"Temper, Temper"	Delyth Thomas	Aileen Gonsalves	8 December 2004	4.8
9	"Love and War"	Delyth Thomas & Keith Washington	Dan Anthony	15 December 2004	4.9
10	"Beam Me Up, Scottie"	Delyth Thomas	Tracy Brabin	4 January 2005	4.10
11	"Testing Times"	Jill Robertson	Sheila Hyde	11 January 2005	4.11
12	"Best of Enemies"	Jill Robertson	Othniel Smith	18 January 2005	4.12
13	"The Finishing Line"	Jill Robertson	Mary Morris	25 January 2005	4.13
14	"Dear Dad"	Jill Robertson	Roger Williams	1 February 2005	4.14
15	"Democracy"	Jill Robertson	Andy Walker	8 February 2005	4.15
16	"The Snake"	Jill Robertson	Laura Summers	15 February 2005	4.16
17	"Rebel Without A Clue"	Jill Robertson	Emma Reeves	22 February 2005	4.17
18	"The Long Run"	Jill Robertson	Marianne Levy	1 March 2005	4.18
19	"Independence Day"	Jill Robertson	Mary Morris	15 March 2005	4.19
20	"Beaker Witch Project"	Jill Robertson	Laura Summers	22 March 2005	4.20
21	"Roxy the Rock"	Jill Robertson	Mary Morris	29 March 2005	4.21
22	"We're Off The Map Now"	Jill Robertson	Gary Parker	5 April 2005	4.22

=== Series 5 (2005) ===
No. in series	Title	Original release date	Prod. code
1	"Caring and Sharing"	28 November 2005	5.1
To wean the kids off vegging out in front of the TV with a more classic pursuit... puppet theatres! Elsewhere, Mike is not enjoying his new role as chef.
2	"Too Many Crooks"	28 November 2005	5.2
There is a mystery thief in the Dumping Ground, as seemingly random items are going missing – but who's responsible? Meanwhile, the feud between reluctant roomies Justine and Rebecca continues to rise. Lol feels torn between Bouncer and Wolfie now that Bouncer is not living at the DG, whilst Mike's cooking continues to cause a stir amongst the kids. Note- Guest appearance of Ben Hanson as Bouncer Platkova
3	"Chantal's Goodbye"	29 November 2005	5.3
The combined force of the Trio of Terror looks set to crumble, as Chantal decides to give her returning father another chance at being a responsible dad, much to the disgust of the other two. All the other kids are overjoyed though, as it may well mean no more Wellard tyranny. Meanwhile, Justine's father Steve pays a surprise visit after a bit of underhand activity on Elaine's part. But Justine remains distant.
4	"Free Piggy"	29 November 2005	5.4
Mike creates a mini-farmyard enclosure in the back garden, complete with three chickens and a fully-grown pig! Lol and Layla feel sorry for the pig, and embark on a liberation mission. Meanwhile, Rio is pulling out all the stops to maximise his chances of getting fostered at Elaine's Open Day, but all Roxy is interested in is maintaining the Wellard unity at any cost. And, A very special face for the DG's past makes a spectacular return on Open Day.
5	"Scary Milly"	30 November 2005	5.5
After the boys discover a creepy looking mask during a loft clear-out, everyone becomes convinced it has mystical powers, especially after strange goings-on start to happen. Is it really the mask – or maybe the Dumping Ground's latest arrival, who's perpetual silence is unsettling to say the least. Meanwhile, Justine is determined to prove to Rebecca that she can be sensitive by befriending a troubled Wolfie, which leads to an embarrassing misunderstanding.
6	"Life Coach"	30 November 2005	5.6
Jackie limps back to the Dumping Ground on a crutch, but she's not in the mood for anything but solitude. Tracy's getting the impression she's not wanted by anyone, and Crash gets some news which makes him take to the punchbag in a big way. Meanwhile, Marco is having a crisis of costume.
7	"Frankelainestein"	1 December 2005	5.7
It's Mother's Day, and Marco needs a mum, but for a very special reason, so Bouncer steps in and poses as a woman, leading to a strange encounter with a very strange shopkeeper. Meanwhile, the newest arrival at the DG, Alice, becomes roommates with Layla and tries to befriend Roxy. But her belief in fairies and fortune soon makes her a target of Roxy's cruelty. and the usually scatty, neurotic Elaine undergoes a complete re-build overnight, which is welcomed by all – at first. Note- Guest Appearance of Ben Hanson as Bouncer Platkova
8	"Tracy's Fantasy"	1 December 2005	5.8
After yet another row with Cam, Tracy, indignant that all the adults in her life are telling her to just grow up and think of others, decides to get them back with a prank-fest, which leads to an accident. A dream sequence follows, where Tracy's now Head Care Worker along with Roxy, all the adults are now children, the silent Milly is the gobbiest kid in the house, and Cam's dressed up and behaving like Tracy herself, and worse still, Justine and Crash are getting married. Will this strange dream soften Tracy's heart towards Cam and Gary?
9	"Cash Cows"	2 December 2005	5.9
It's 'Be Nice To Wolfie Day' in the Dumping Ground, as two groups of kids vie for his favour after finding out he's been receiving unwanted 'conscience cheques' from his parents totalling over £1,000 – but what good will come of it? Meanwhile, Lol and Bouncer become odd-job men around the house, but who's responsible for the place falling apart? Note- Guest Appearance of Ben Hanson as Bouncer Platkova
10	"Telling Tales"	2 December 2005	5.10
Tracy, Crash, Rio, Lol and Justine are grounded after performing a series of pranks on the staff. Bored, the five keep themselves entertained by telling tales featuring the staff. Meanwhile, Shelley Appleton returns to the DG to take over the role of "Acting Careworker".
11	"A Dog's Life"	5 December 2005	5.11
After Alice introduces Layla and Roxy to one of her 'wish-necklaces', strange things seem to start happening at the DG. Firstly, an abandoned dog turns up, then a wealthy couple with a view to fostering, and it's not long before the battlelines are drawn between the money-mad kids. Meanwhile, Tracy interviews Crash and Jackie about life in care for a newspaper article, and Roxy undergoes a complete makeover.
12	"Whodunnit?"	5 December 2005	5.12
When Elaine is targeted in a revenge attack, Justine is assigned to solve the mystery. But it proves to be a tough job, as everyone seems to have a motive for punishing Elaine the Pain.
13	"Spare Dad"	6 December 2005	5.13
Crash's dad has an appointment to visit him at the Dumping Ground, but, with Justine and Jackie at loggerheads as to what's best for Crash, and Rio trying to muscle in on having a dad, Will father and son ever get the privacy they need to work out terms for starting again? Meanwhile, Justine, Jackie and Roxy fear they are becoming like Elaine as they interfere in Crash's life.
14	"Operation Careworker"	6 December 2005	5.14
When the DG kids find they'll have no say in who replaces Shelley as Head Care Worker, they decide to add their own interview stage to the three applicants up for the post. They begin to think they might have a winner, but nothing's as simple as that at Elm Tree House... Maybe the new Head Careworker lies much closer to home. Last appearance of Shelley Appleton
15	"Bouncer's Kitchen"	7 December 2005	5.15
When Mike ruins yet another meal and has to resort to takeaways once again, and finally resigns himself to the fact that Duke has gone for good, he decides to appoint Bouncer as new chef, which the kids are overjoyed at. But when Bouncer introduces a new macrobiotic regime with no sugars or additives at all, most of the kids are revolted – until very strange things start to occur... Note- Guest Appearance of Ben Hanson as Bouncer Platkova
16	"Love All"	7 December 2005	5.16
It's Valentine's Day, and Elaine and Mike have arranged a romantic disco party for all the kids, on the proviso that they all pair off for it – much to Roxy's disgust! With no love in the air, Marco and Milly spend the day playing Cupid in a series of ingenious ways, and one resident gets a comeuppance they'll never forget! Meanwhile, Justine and Rebecca are at loggerheads as they both want to be paired with Crash. Note- Guest Appearance of Ben Hanson as Bouncer Platkova
17	"Toddler In Town"	8 December 2005	5.17
After Mike bangs his head and Elaine has to take him to hospital with mild concussion, Justine is left in charge of the DG. But before she can fully start throwing her weight around, a surprise visitor arrives and turns the house upside down. Could this new arrival spell the end of her feud with Rebecca? Meanwhile, an old chest is found in the attic, and Lol, Roxy and Rio become fixated on finding out what's inside it.
18	"Two's A Crowd"	8 December 2005	5.18
There's a whole world of activity during Special Guest Day at the Dumping Ground – Justine had been looking forward to her dad Steve visiting, only to find he's brought the worst plus-one she could ever imagine, and Marco looks set to move in with the Boxers, but how will poor Milly take the news? Flying Freddie Mercer is subjected to a most demeaning prank and Bouncer finds his special treats have been doctored – It soon becomes clear that someone is trying to ruin the day. Note- Guest Appearance of Ben Hanson as Bouncer Platkova
19	"Moving On"	9 December 2005	5.19
Lol's heading to join his brother at the halfway house, and his leaving party prompts Tracy to consider her future – she hasn't long left to stay at the Dumping Ground herself, and even Alice can't see what's in store for her! After some pondering, she decides to give Cam one more chance, but how will she react to the surprise announcement Cam has for her?
20	"The Wedding"	9 December 2005	5.20
It's Cam and Gary's big day – but Tracy still doesn't want anything to do with it, and she won't tell anyone why. But when she changes her mind and crashes the wedding, Cam and her new husband drop a bombshell which changes everything! Meanwhile, it looks like Crash's artwork has finally attracted some professional interest, and it looks like the whole cycle is going to repeat itself with a new arrival at the Dumping Ground...

== Spin off media ==
=== Tracy Beaker Survival Files (2011–2012) ===
A thirteen part series entitled "Tracy Beaker Survival Files" was aired and featured clips from Tracy Beaker Returns and The Story of Tracy Beaker.

Series	Episodes	Originally released	
Series	Episodes	First released	Last released
Tracy Beaker: The Movie of Me		21 February 2004	
Tracy Beaker Survival Files		16 December 2011	6 January 2012
Jody In Wonderland		16 December 2013	
The Dumping Ground Survival Files		6 January 2014	4 December 2020
Liam's Story		17 January 2014	14 March 2014; 23 March 2014 (TV)
The Dumping Ground Dish Up		16 November 2015	20 November 2015
The Dumping Ground: I'm...		25 January 2016	9 February 2017
Floss The Foundling		25 March 2016	
Dumping Ground Island		22 December 2017	
Sasha's Contact Meeting		6 April 2018	
After The DG		16 July 2018	4 August 2018
The Joseph & Taz Files		27 August 2018	

== See also ==
- List of Tracy Beaker Returns episodes
- List of The Dumping Ground episodes
