= The Beaker Girls =

British television series

- Genre: Children's drama; Comedy drama
- Based on: We Are The Beaker Girls by Jacqueline Wilson
- Written by: Emma Reeves
- Starring: Dani Harmer; Emma Maggie Davies; Chi-Megan Ennis-McLean; Lisa Coleman; Danielle Henry; Wim Snape
- Narrated by: Emma Maggie Davies
- Music by: Kevin Sargent
- Country of origin: United Kingdom
- Original language: English
- No. of series: 2
- No. of episodes: 17

Production
- Running time: 30 minutes (series 1); 24–29 minutes (series 2)
- Production company: BBC Studios Kids & Family Productions

Original release
- Network: CBBC
- Release: 13 December 2021 – 31 March 2023

Related
- The Story of Tracy Beaker; Tracy Beaker Returns; The Dumping Ground (franchise); My Mum Tracy Beaker (chronologically)

The Beaker Girls is a British children's television series that premiered on CBBC and BBC iPlayer on 13 December 2021. The series follows on from the events of its predecessors, The Story of Tracy Beaker, Tracy Beaker Returns, The Dumping Ground and My Mum Tracy Beaker. It sees Dani Harmer reprise her role as Tracy Beaker and Emma Maggie Davies return as her daughter Jess. Lisa Coleman and Montanna Thompson also returned, as well as several cast members from My Mum Tracy Beaker. In August 2022, Dani Harmer posted on her Instagram that filming for the second series had finished. The BBC confirmed that Series 2 would be the final series of the My Mum Tracy Beaker/Beaker Girls boxset for now. It began airing on 13 January 2023 and concluded on 31 March.

== Plot ==
Tracy and Jess are settling into their new life in the seaside town of Cooksea. Their new friend Flo is a former actress who owns a junk shop ironically named 'The Dumping Ground' of which Tracy becomes the manager, they later meet a teenager named Jordan, who is later found out to be a runaway from the care system, and Tracy invites her to stay with her and Jess.

== Production ==
Following the success of the miniseries My Mum Tracy Beaker, in August 2021, CBBC announced that a new series based on the book We Are The Beaker Girls would premiere in mid December. The series saw most of the main cast from My Mum Tracy Beaker reprise their roles along with newcomers Chi-Megan Ennis-McLean as Jordan Whitely and Alibe Parsons as junk shop owner Flo. Wim Snape replaces Jim English in the role as Peter Ingham. The series is set in the fictional town of Cooksea and was filmed in summer 2021 in Clevedon on the North Somerset coast. A second series was announced in 2022 and filmed over the summer, and then shown in January 2023.

== Cast ==
Main

- Dani Harmer as Tracy Beaker
- Emma Maggie Davies as Jessica "Jess" Beaker, Tracy's 12-year-old daughter
- Chi-Megan Ennis-McLean as Jordan Whitely, a 15-year-old care runaway teenage girl
- Wim Snape as Peter Ingham, an old friend from Tracy's time in care, and the headteacher of Cooksea High
- Noah Leacock as Tyrone, Jess' best friend
- Alibe Parsons as Florence "Flo" Garland, the elderly owner of the junk shop
- Daisey Hamilton as Patience "Paysh" Price, Jess' school friend
- Emma Handy as Mrs Joanne Cook, Jess' form teacher
- Simon Lipkin as Simon “Si” Rajani-Martin, Jess' father (Series 2; recurring series 1)
- Taj Kandula as Priya Rajani-Martin, Si's wife (Series 2)
- Diya Sohi as Asha Rajani-Martin, Priya's daughter and Si's stepdaughter (Series 2)

Recurring

- Lisa Coleman as Camilla "Cam" Lawson, Tracy's adoptive mum and Jess' adoptive grandmother
- Danielle Henry as Mary Oliver, Cam's wife and Tracy's adoptive stepmother
- Montanna Thompson as Justine Littlewood - Tracy's childhood enemy
- Myles Young as baby Steve Godfrey-Littlewood, (son of Justine and Sean)
- Jordan Duvigneau as Sean Godfrey, Tracy's ex-boyfriend and father of Justine's baby, Steve Godrey-Littlewood (Series 1)
- Tarun Sivakanesh as Ajay Rajani-Martin, Priya's son and Si's stepson (Series 2)
- Jesse Benjamin as Alex Rajani-Martin, Priya and Si's son (Series 2)
- Buddy Skelton as Moses "Mosey" Price, Patience's brother (Series 2)
- Mersey Moore as Seren, Mrs Cook's niece (Series 2)

Guest

- Nisha Nayar as Elaine "the Pain" Boyak - Tracy's former social worker
- Connor Byrne as Mike Milligan - Tracy's former care worker and colleague

== Episodes ==
=== Series overview ===
Series	Episodes	Originally released	
Series	Episodes	First released	Last released
1	5	13 December 2021	17 December 2021
2	12	13 January 2023	31 March 2023

=== Series 1 (2021) ===
No.	Title	Directed by	Written by	Original release date
1	"The Ice Cream Thief"	John McKay	Emma Reeves	13 December 2021
Tracy and Jess are settling into their new life in the seaside town of Cooksea. Their new friend Flo is a former actress who owns a junk shop ironically named 'The Dumping Ground' of which Tracy becomes the manager. Whilst out buying ice creams, Jess is mugged by a thief who turns out to be a girl named Jordan who is in care and meets another girl called Patience at the beach. Tracy's friend and former Dumping Ground resident Peter Ingham returns and is set to become Jess' new headteacher when she starts secondary school. Jess does her best to help Jordan but is furious when she discovers she is a thief and has stolen from the local shop. Meanwhile Jess' friend Tyrone and Tracy's ex-boyfriend Sean Godfrey turn up to surprise them in their new hometown.
2	"Showdown at the Shore"	John McKay	Emma Reeves	14 December 2021
Sean and Tyrone’s visit leads to an eventful picnic on the beach as everyone discovers the truth about Jordan. Justine Littlewood returns and vandalises Sean Godfrey's car, accusing him of cheating on her and reveals to Tracy that her father is suffering with dementia. Meanwhile, Jordan has nowhere to run when Tracy discovers the truth about her.
3	"My Sister Jordan"	John McKay	Emma Reeves	15 December 2021
Tracy invites Jordan to live with them and Jess is relieved that her secret is finally out, but now has to adjust to life with Jordan as part of her family. Cam and Mary arrive in Cooksea to give their advice after Peter informs them of Tracy's decision. Jess starts secondary school and is shocked to find out her new teacher is the woman who she threw a burger at on the pier. After overhearing Cam and Mary encouraging Tracy to inform social services, Jordan runs away.
4	"The Runaway Returns"	John McKay	Emma Reeves	16 December 2021
Tracy discovers that Jordan has stolen £500 from her bank account and as Jess struggles to deal with Jordan’s disappearance, she also has to find space to deal with the surprise arrival of her father back in her life and begins to reconnect with him and discovers her father is married and that she has a younger half brother called Alex. Jess is angry with Tracy for not telling her about her father's family and after going to Cam for advice decides she is not ready to let her father back in her life.
5	"The Beaker Girls' Christmas"	John McKay	Emma Reeves	17 December 2021
It is Christmas in Cooksea, Jordan has now been missing for several months however when Jess and Patience are in town they discover Jordan busking for money, however she runs away yet again and Jess discovers she is sleeping rough. Jess questions Jordan as to why she stole from her mum. Justine calls Tracy and reveals she has split up with Sean Godfrey again and that her father Steve has died. Tracy decides to invite Justine for Christmas but Jess is not happy and tells Tracy she wants to spend Christmas with her dad. When Sean Godfrey is helping out at a charity Christmas Grotto, Justine arrives and reveals she is heavily pregnant. Jess sees Jordan once again and makes one final attempt to bring her home but they discover Justine going into labour on the beach and she gives birth to a baby boy in the beach hut on Christmas Eve, whom she names after her father. The Beaker Girls celebrate Christmas with their family and friends.

=== Series 2 (2023) ===
No.	Title	Directed by	Written by	Original release date
1	"My Foster Mum Tracy Beaker"	Suri Krishnamma	Emma Reeves	13 January 2023
Tracy is almost approved to foster Jordan, but after a series of mishaps, such as Tracy falling through the floor of Jordan's new room and Jess, Jordan and Tyrone pranking the daughter of the person who is organising the fostering, will it go ahead?
2	"Fakey Beaker"	Suri Krishnamma	Emma Reeves	20 January 2023
After a mean video of Jess gets shared online, she is desperate to reinvent her image. Her and Paysh devise a plan to deduce the suspect.
3	"Between a Net and a Hard Place"	Suri Krishnamma	Candis Negaard	27 January 2023
Jess and Paysh campaign to remove a ghost net from the beach against the odds, while Asha goes all out to win Jess’s forgiveness for the cyberbullying.
4	"Tyrone Takes His Shot"	Suri Krishnamma	Paul Gerstenberger	3 February 2023
Can Jess help Tyrone make the right decision when his football dreams are threatened?
5	"Pride and Punchlines"	Suri Krishnamma	Theo Toksvig-Stewart	10 February 2023
Love is in the air as Jess develops her first crush and Flo has a date - but did the course of true love ever run smoothly?
6	"Trash or Treasure"	Meg Campbell	Lucy Moore	17 February 2023
Jess and the gang discover a ring on the beach, while Tracy gets a crush. Jess must solve a riddle to save the day in a race against time.
7	"Distinctions"	Meg Campbell	Mina Barber	24 February 2023
Jess is shocked when Asha does something unexpected that puts Jordan at risk.
8	"Telling Stories"	Meg Campbell	Sarah McDonald Hughes	3 March 2023
Tracy faces an upsetting blast from the past, while Jordan’s past threatens to stop her facing her future. Can Jess help the Beaker Girls find a way forward?
9	"Birthdays and Bombshells"	Suri Krishnamma	Julie Dixon	10 March 2023
Jess’s 13th birthday doesn’t go to plan, as a series of mishaps see her celebrating on her own. However, she takes control and throws a party that changes everything!
10	"The Last Straw"	Suri Krishnamma	Lou Ramsden	17 March 2023
Jess leads a protest against an environmentally unfriendly café against her mum’s advice and Jordan and Asha set out to change Mrs Cook’s unrepresentative musical.
11	"The Spirit of Cooksea"	Suri Krishnamma	Emma Reeves	24 March 2023
Jordan steps up to lead the community play after Seren drops out. After discovering that Jess and Asha made it possible through a prank, the truth about Jordan and Asha comes out. Asha's parents forbid them from seeing each other, leading to them running away together.
12	"The Trial of Tracy Beaker"	Suri Krishnamma	Emma Reeves	31 March 2023
After Tracy's accident, Si decides that he wants custody of Jess. To stop her family being torn apart, Jess takes matters into her own hands and organises a mock trial hosted by Justine Littlewood to show how good a mum Tracy is.

== Reception ==
The series was praised in The Guardian for having a nostalgic feel and was named as one of the seven best shows to watch in December. The writers stated "The Story of The Beaker Girls is just beginning... For millennials who grew up learning about life through Jacqueline Wilson books, the promising exit line of this year’s Tracy Beaker reboot was a welcome one. Following a now grownup Tracy and her daughter Jess, it scratched a nostalgic itch while continuing to beautifully explore the care system, with plenty of silly moments in between."
