= My Mum Tracy Beaker =

British television series

- Genre: Children's drama; Comedy drama
- Based on: My Mum Tracy Beaker by Jacqueline Wilson
- Written by: Emma Reeves
- Starring: Dani Harmer; Emma Maggie Davies; Danielle Henry; Noah Leacock; Jordan Duvigneau; Lisa Coleman; Christina Tam; Montanna Thompson; Ruth Gemmell
- Narrated by: Emma Maggie Davies
- Ending theme: "Someday" sung by Keisha White
- Country of origin: United Kingdom
- Original language: English
- No. of episodes: 3

Production
- Executive producer: Spencer Campbell
- Editor: Conor Meechan
- Running time: 30 minutes
- Production company: BBC Children's Productions

Original release
- Network: CBBC, BBC One (repeat on 28 March 2021)
- Release: 12 February – 14 February 2021

Related
- The Story of Tracy Beaker; Tracy Beaker Returns; The Dumping Ground; The Beaker Girls

My Mum Tracy Beaker is a British children's television miniseries that premiered on CBBC and BBC One on 12 February 2021. The show was aired the week after The Dumping Ground's eighth series concluded. The series follows on from the events of its predecessors, The Story of Tracy Beaker, Tracy Beaker Returns and The Dumping Ground. My Mum Tracy Beaker saw Dani Harmer reprise her role as Tracy Beaker and included original cast members Lisa Coleman, Ruth Gemmell and Montanna Thompson, as well as new cast members Emma Maggie Davies and Jordan Duvigneau.

On 18 August 2021, CBBC announced that a second series based on the book's sequel would premiere in mid December. The Beaker Girls saw most of the main cast from My Mum Tracy Beaker reprise their roles along with newcomers Chi-Megan Ennis and Alibe Parsons.

== Cast ==
- Dani Harmer as Tracy Beaker
- Emma Maggie Davies as Jess Beaker
- Jordan Duvigneau as Sean Godfrey
- Lisa Coleman as Cam Lawson
- Montanna Thompson as Justine Littlewood
- Danielle Henry as Mary Oliver
- Noah Leacock as Tyrone
- Christina Tam as Rosalie
- Ruth Gemmell as Carly Beaker
- Jim English as Peter Ingham
- Neil Ashton as Fred

== Development ==
The details regarding My Mum Tracy Beaker were announced on 3 August 2020, where it was announced that the series would be based on the 2018 book of the same name by Tracy's creator, Jacqueline Wilson, and it was confirmed that Harmer would be reprising the role of Tracy. Speaking about reprising the role of Tracy prior to filming, Harmer stated that she cannot wait to play her again, stating that she is a fan of the character herself, and she is interested to see where Tracy has ended up in life. She added that since she is a mother in real life, she knows the changes it causes to your life and personality, but confirmed that Tracy will still be the "same feisty, strong female lead that people know and love". It was later hinted that other original cast members from the franchise may reprise their roles in the series.

On 5 October 2020, it was confirmed by Harmer that filming had begun, and casting announcements were made. Emma Davies was cast as Tracy's daughter Jess, and it was confirmed that unlike previous Tracy Beaker series, the narration will not be told through the perspective of Tracy, instead being told by her 10-year-old daughter, Jess. Jordan Duvigneau was cast as Tracy's "new, rich ex-footballer boyfriend" Sean Godfrey, and the returns of characters Cam Lawson, Carly Beaker and Justine Littlewood were announced, all portrayed by the original actresses. A trailer for the series premiered on 5 February 2021, and it was confirmed that the first series, consisting of three episodes, would air on CBBC and BBC iPlayer from 12 to 14 February 2021. My Mum Tracy Beaker continues to be broadcast regularly on the CBBC Channel from 2022.

== Episodes ==
No.	Title	Directed by	Written by	Original release date	UK viewers (millions)
1	"The Person I Most Admire"	John McKay	Emma Reeves	12 February 2021	0.95
For a presentation at school, Jess talks about her mother Tracy as the person she most admires. Classmate Tyrone mocks her presentation, and the pair argue, leading teacher Mary to call Tracy. Tracy loses her temper with Miss Oliver, who recommends she attends kickboxing to manage her anger. There, Tracy meets Sean Godfrey, an ex-footballer she knew from her childhood. Jess takes a dislike to Sean and is unhappy when he asks them to move in. Sean later proposes to Tracy, but she does not respond to his proposal.
2	"Like a Family"	John McKay	Emma Reeves	13 February 2021	0.59
Sean tells Jess that she can decide if Tracy and Sean get married, and she eventually says that they can. Tracy arrives home to find Justine Littlewood in a business meeting with Sean, and the pair put their rivalry behind them and discuss their past. Tracy invites her birth mother, Carly, to her engagement party. She arrives late and has a confrontation with Tracy's adoptive mother, Cam. Jess finds Sean's second phone, and sees messages from a woman that is not Tracy. She follows Sean to a restaurant, and sees him kissing Justine.
3	"I Want My Mum Back"	John McKay	Emma Reeves	14 February 2021	0.43
Jess shows Tracy Sean's phone, who then moves out and leaves her engagement ring at his house. Tracy returns to working as a waitress, but is fired when she assaults Justine in the restaurant after she insults Jess. Sean begs for Tracy's forgiveness, but she insists that they are over. Carly questions Tracy on why she refuses to reconcile with Sean, who explains that she must put Jess first to be a good mother. She then forgives Carly for her bad mothering skills. Cam and Mary get married, and Weedy Peter attends at the wedding as a teacher friend of Mary's. He talks with Tracy, and informs her that he is a headteacher now, and the pair laugh about their past.

== Ratings ==
On 15 February 2021, CBBC announced that the series was their most successful programme launch with 2.1 million streams on BBC iPlayer during the first three days of being made available. The first episode on 12 February attracted an average figure of 492,000 viewers aged four and above on CBBC itself. Seven-day ratings saw the figure rise to 883,000.
