= Alibe Parsons =

American-British actress (born 1935)

- Born: Alibe Joan Peak; 21 December 1935 (age 90); Missouri, United States
- Occupation: Actress

Alibe Parsons (born 21 December 1935) is an actress who has worked in both film and television.

== Early life ==
Born in Missouri, Alibe studied theatre arts and singing in Los Angeles, becoming a talented pianist at the age of 13. This led to appearing on stage and screen as a dancer, notably with the Lester Horton Dancers On 6 March 1954, she married actor John Copage (known for various roles in the Star Trek franchise). They were together for 10 years and had a son, actor Marc Copage (best known as Corey Baker in the sitcom Julia).

== Career ==
After leaving America, Alibe went on to appear in films and act on stage in both Italy and Spain. Arriving in Europe around 1972 with the American Negro Theatre, she decided to settle in London and has remained there since. The actress married her second husband, Derek Lawrence Parsons, in Gibraltar on 1 November 1973.

On television, she is best known for her regular role in the 1970s BBC drama Gangsters as Sarah Gant. She also had a recurring role in the science fiction series Space: 1999 and an appearance in Doctor Who in the 1986 serial The Trial of a Time Lord (segment: Mindwarp). In 2021, she joined the cast of The Beaker Girls as Flo.

Her other credits include Coronation Street, Bergerac, Lovejoy, Holby City, The Bill, and Waking the Dead.

Her film roles include Game for Vultures (1979), The Bitch (1979), Biggles (1986), and Aliens (1986).

Stage work includes touring for four years with the Royal Shakespeare Company in The Crucible and The Winter's Tale to places such as Poland and performing in Abbey Theatre's production of You Can't Take It with You in Dublin.
