= Children's Party at the Palace =

2006 event

"Ladies and gentlemen, and children everywhere. As has been so evident this afternoon British children's literature has been for many years an extraordinary success story and I am glad that we have been able to celebrate this great achievement here at Buckingham Palace."

— Queen Elizabeth II, 2006.

The Children's Party at the Palace was an event organised by Peter Orton of Hit Entertainment and David Johnstone of DJI consult, held in the Garden at Buckingham Palace on 25 June 2006 in honour of the 80th birthday of Queen Elizabeth II. The event, which had the theme of British children's literature, was attended by 2,000 children and 1,000 adults who were chosen through a national ballot. On arrival, all guests received a purple hamper with snacks put together by Jamie Oliver.

For the occasion, the palace grounds were transformed into scenes from children's books, including places like the Hundred Acre Wood, with 80 costumed characters and a model of the BFG sitting at a huge piano. The grounds also had an authors' corner, where authors like J. K. Rowling, Philip Pullman, Eric Hill and Raymond Briggs read from their books and signed autographs.

== The Queen's Handbag ==
The main attraction of the party was a pantomime-style play called The Queen's Handbag, written by children's author and playwright David Wood and directed by Trevor Nunn, which was performed on a stage resembling Buckingham Palace and broadcast live on both BBC One and the CBBC Channel.

In the play, the villains of children's literature are angry to find out none of them have been invited to the party, so they decide to ruin the party for the goodies too. After multiple failed attempts, one of them manages to steal the Queen's handbag. Without its contents (her reading glasses) the Queen won't be able to deliver her closing speech. Multiple scenes of the play, including a scene starring Harry Potter and his friends at Hogwarts that was filmed during production of the Order of the Phoenix film, were pre-recorded and played on large video screens.

The play ended with a rendition of "Supercalifragilisticexpialidocious" by the entire cast, led by the London company of the musical Mary Poppins. Throughout the programme, the audience was kept up to date about the status of the missing handbag with reports from both BBC News and Crimewatch. The use of a fake newsflash caused complaints to be made to the BBC.

=== Cast ===
- Queen Elizabeth II as herself
- Prince Philip, Duke of Edinburgh as himself
- Pam St Clement as Aunt Sponge
- June Brown as Aunt Spiker
- The Big Friendly Giant
- Sophie Dahl as Sophie
- Ronnie Corbett as Mr. Tibbs
- Meera Syal as Mary
- Patsy Kensit as The Grand High Witch
- Thomas the Tank Engine
- Jonathan Ross as The Fat Controller
- Postman Pat
- Mr. Men and Little Miss
- The Gruffalo
- Fireman Sam
- Maisy
- Kacey Ainsworth as Peter Pan
- Kelly Osbourne as Wendy
- Anthony Head as Captain Hook
- Noddy
- Martin Clunes as Mr. Plod
- Sly and Gobbo
- Janine Duvitski as Maid at Buckingham Palace
- Angelina Ballerina
- Dennis the Menace and Gnasher
- Alexander Loxton as Peter Rabbit
- Konnie Huq, Gethin Jones, Zöe Salmon, Matt Baker and Mabel as The Famous Five
- Daniel Radcliffe as Harry Potter
- Rupert Grint as Ron Weasley
- Emma Watson as Hermione Granger
- Matthew Lewis as Neville Longbottom
- Harry Hill as The Prime Minister's Owl Keeper
- Bernard Cribbins as Station Guard
- Alan Titchmarsh as Percy the Park Keeper
- Winnie-the-Pooh
- Rupert Bear
- Paddington Bear
- Kipper
- Spot
- Scarlett Strallen as Mary Poppins
- Gavin Lee as Bert
- Joe Pasquale as The White Rabbit
- Sanjeev Bhaskar as Robin Hood
- Dani Harmer as Tracy Beaker
- Montanna Thompson as Justin Littlewood
- Darragh Mortell as Crash Watkins
- Sam Aston as Horrid Henry
- Luke Tittensor as William Brown
- Bradley Walsh as Burglar Bill
- Richard O'Brien as The Child Catcher from Chitty Chitty Bang Bang
- Amanda Redman as Cruella de Vil
- Nicholas Lyndhurst as Cruella's chauffeur
- Jerry Hall as The Queen of the Pirates
- Nick Ross as himself
- Fiona Bruce as herself
- Huw Edwards as himself
- Sophie Raworth as herself
- Simon Grant as Owl
- Matthew Stevens as Jazz Singer in the London Underground
