= The Story of Tracy Beaker (TV series) =

British television series

- The Story of Tracy Beaker title card
- Created by: Jacqueline Wilson (Books)<
- Based on: The Story of Tracy Beaker
- Showrunner: Elly Brewer
- Starring: List of Tracy Beaker series characters
- Opening theme: "Someday" sung by Keisha White
- Country of origin: United Kingdom
- Original language: English
- No. of series: 5
- No. of episodes: 120 + 5 specials (list of episodes)

Production
- Executive producers: Cas Lester (2002–2003); Jane Dauncey (2004–2005); Josephine Ward (2006)
- Producers: Jane Dauncey (2002–2003); Mia Jupp (2004–2005); Jane Steventon (2006–2007)
- Production locations: Ealing, London (Series 1); Cardiff, Wales (Series 2–5)
- Running time: 14 minutes (regular episode); 69 minutes (Tracy Beaker: The Movie of Me); 30 minutes (Parties With Pudsey)
- Production company: BBC

Original release
- Network: CBBC
- Release: 8 January 2002 – 9 December 2005

Related
- Tracy Beaker Survival Files (2011–2012); The Dumping Ground Survival Files (2014–2020); Tracy Beaker Returns (2010–2012); The Dumping Ground (2013–present); My Mum Tracy Beaker (2021); The Beaker Girls (2021–2023)

The Story of Tracy Beaker (informally known as Tracy Beaker or TSOTB) is a British television programme series adapted from the book of the same name by Jacqueline Wilson. It ran on CBBC for five series, from January 2002 to December 2005 and also contained a feature-length episode, Tracy Beaker: The Movie of Me, broadcast in February 2004, as well as a week of interactive episodes for Children in Need. The theme song was written and produced by Brian Harris and Nigel Lowis and performed by Keisha White.

It has become one of CBBC's most popular and repeated programmes, and still airs, however sporadically, on the channel as of 2026. Subsequently, it has spawned a number of spin-offs: Tracy Beaker Returns in 2010, which was followed by The Dumping Ground in 2013, and both My Mum Tracy Beaker and The Beaker Girls in 2021.

== Production ==
The Story of Tracy Beaker, written by Jacqueline Wilson, was first published in 1991. Wilson's book Cliffhanger had previously been adapted as a two-part drama for television in 1995, though this was the first of her works to become a fully fledged series. The first series was filmed on location at Amherst Lodge in Ealing, which doubled as the care home Stowey House, during Summer 2001. The building, which was a former maternity home and children's home, was sold by Ealing Council shortly after the series aired, and production moved to Cardiff for series 2. Amherst Lodge has since been developed into flats.

Due to a change in production location, many of the cast from the first series departed: Jay Haher (Zac Patterson), Sonny Muslim (Ryan Patterson), Joe Starrs (Peter Ingham) and Jerome Holder (Maxy King). The building used across the second and third series, plus Tracy Beaker: The Movie of Me was The Hollies, a former nursing home on Station Road in Llanishen. No reference was made to the change in location and the children's home continued to be known as Stowey House. The Hollies now houses private offices.

The fourth series was filmed at Skomer House, on Marine Parade in Penarth, and the change in location was addressed within the programme for the first time, and the children's home was named as Cliffside during the series. The building, which was once a nursing home, has since been redeveloped into a luxury hotel and spa, Holm House.

The fifth and final series saw another change in production location, with the Elm Tree House School in Llandaff doubling as another new care home, Elm Tree House, taking inspiration from the real building. After production ended, the former school was demolished to make way for a small housing development. The name of the building was retained for Tracy Beaker Returns and the first series of The Dumping Ground, regardless of being filmed in Newcastle and not Cardiff.

== Episodes ==
| Series | Episodes | Originally released | |
| Series | Episodes | First released | Last released |
|---|---|---|---|
| 1 | 26 | 8 January 2002 | 4 April 2002 |
| 2 | 26 | 7 January 2003 | 3 April 2003 |
| 3 | 26 | 25 September 2003 | 1 April 2004 |
| Television film | | 21 February 2004 | |
| 4 | 22 | 7 October 2004 | 5 April 2005 |
| 5 | 20 | 28 November 2005 | 9 December 2005 |

The pilot episode aired on 8 January 2002 and the series finale aired on 9 December 2005. The show spanned a total of five series with 120 episodes in total.

Series 1 builds upon the characters introduced within Jacqueline Wilson's books: Tracy (Dani Harmer), Justine (Montanna Thompson), Louise (Chelsie Padley), Peter Ingham (Joe Starrs), Elaine Boyak (Nisha Nayar), Adele (Rochelle Gadd), Jenny (Sharlene Whyte) and Cam (Lisa Coleman), whilst introducing other careworkers and children who live in Stowey House. Three episodes in Series 1 form the basis of the show and make the format and atmosphere easy to understand, "Sneaking in Ben" shows Tracy's friendships, "The Truth Is Revealed" shows Tracy's way of thinking and "Friend" shows Tracy's way of understanding things.

From Series 2 onwards the show differs greatly from Wilson's follow-up novels, although the Movie of Me does share some narrative similarities with sequel The Dare Game.

== Home releases ==
The Story of Tracy Beaker has been released on DVD in the UK by Right Entertainment and Universal Pictures Video, under licence from the BBC.

The series saw five retail compilation releases which each featured episodes from their respective series, titled "Best of Me" (released on 6 February 2006), "More of Me" (Released on 22 May 2006), "Starring Me" (Released on 2 October 2006), "Totally Me" (Released on 26 March 2007) and "Farewell from Me?" (released on 7 January 2008). These releases featured the half-hour version of the series, with two episodes combined into one, except for "Farewell From Me", which contains twelve standard-length episodes. All five volumes were later combined with the DVD release of "The Movie of Me" to form "Tracy Beaker – The Boxset of Me" ( released on 11 February 2008).

Tracy Beaker – The Movie of Me was released on DVD by Right/Universal on 23 July 2005.

From 2006–2008, the entire series was released on twenty-four DVD sets that were released as part of a fortnightly-published magazine titled the "Tracy Beaker DVD Collection".

== Awards and nominations ==
| Ceremony | Award | Nominee | Result |
|---|---|---|---|
| 2002 Children's BAFTA Awards | Children's Drama | The Story of Tracy Beaker | Nominated |
| 2003 Children's BAFTA Awards | Children's Drama | The Story of Tracy Beaker | Nominated |
| 2003 Children's BAFTA Awards | Children's Writer | Mary Morris | Nominated |
| 2004 Children's BAFTA Awards | Children's Drama | Tracy Beaker: The Movie of Me | Nominated |
| 2005 Children's BAFTA Awards | Children's Writer – Adapted In | Mary Morris | Nominated |
| 2005 Royal Television Awards | Children's Award | Tracy Beaker: The Movie of Me | Won |
| 2006 Children's BAFTA Awards | Children's Drama | The Story of Tracy Beaker | Nominated |

== Reruns ==
When the series ended, repeats of the series were shown frequently on the CBBC channel until 24 March 2016 (stopping part-way through series 5). However, all episodes were released on the BBC iPlayer in July 2017 and remained there until the end of the year. The episodes returned in September 2018, and on 2 December 2018, the movie was shown again, followed by two episodes of the show on 3 and 4 December 2018. The movie continues to be broadcast regularly, and the series returned to the iPlayer in May 2019. The series was repeated again on CBBC from 4 January 2021, and again from 6 July 2026.

== See also ==
- Punky Brewster, a U.S. TV series with largely the same premise, as well as a similar main character.
- Lizzie McGuire, a U.S. TV series most commonly associated with the "animated thoughts/reactions" concept.
