= Danielle Henry =

British actress (born 1985/86)

- Born: 1985 or 1986 (age 40–41)
- Occupation: Actress
- Years active: 2001–present
- Television: Emmerdale; Doctors; My Mum Tracy Beaker

Danielle Henry (born 1985/1986) is a British actress, known for playing Mandy Marquez in the BBC soap opera Doctors. She has also appeared as Latisha Daggert in the ITV soap opera Emmerdale, as well as Mary Oliver in the CBBC series My Mum Tracy Beaker.

== Career ==
Henry made her debut acting appearance in the ITV soap opera Emmerdale; she appeared as Latisha Daggert from 2001 to 2002, later making a brief return in 2006. She then made appearances in series such as Torchwood and Survivors, and in 2011, she starred in the BBC series Candy Cabs. In 2012, Henry was cast in the BBC soap opera Doctors as series regular Mandy Marquez. In the soap, she played the girlfriend of Freya Wilson, who is portrayed by Lu Corfield, her former Candy Cabs co-star. The pair were nominated for Best On-Screen Partnership at the 2014 British Soap Awards. In 2021, she starred in the CBBC series My Mum Tracy Beaker as Mary Oliver.

== Filmography ==
Year	Title	Role	Notes
2001–2002, 2006	Emmerdale	Latisha Daggert	Regular role
2005	Doctors	Jenny Crowther	Episode: "Intervention"
2007	Diamond Geezer	Chanelle	Episode: "Old School Lies"
2008	Torchwood	Megan	Episode: "Something Borrowed"
2009	Paradox	Kalla Hudson	1 episode
2010	Survivors	Tanya	1 episode
2010	Soulboy	Chrissie	Film
2010	Moving On	Jen	Episode: "I am Darleen Fyles"
2011	Casualty	Siobhan Davies	Episode: "A Real Shame"
2011	Candy Cabs	Sally-Ann	Main role
2011	Lost Christmas	WPC	Film
2012–2014	Doctors	Mandy Marquez	Regular role
2015	No Offence	Jan	1 episode
2017	Broken	WPC Haley Magee	Episode: "Carl"
2019	Moving On	Trish	Episode: "A Walk in My Shoes"
2020	The Third Day	Islander	Recurring role
2021	My Mum Tracy Beaker	Mary Oliver	Main role
2021–2023	The Beaker Girls	Mary Oliver	Main role
2021	Silent Witness	DI Lisa Brodie	2 episodes
2023	The Reckoning	Nurse	Guest role
2023	Time	Tess Palmer	Supporting role
2024	Odd Squad	Takeaway Trudy	Episode: "A Tour of Odd Squad"
2025	The Good Ship Murder	Lindsay Eldergill	Episode: "Gran Canaria"

== Awards and nominations ==
Year	Ceremony	Category	Nominated work	Result	Ref.
2014	British Soap Awards	Best On-Screen Partnership (with Lu Corfield)	Doctors	Nominated	
2014	British Soap Awards	Sexiest Female	Doctors	Nominated	
