= Dani Harmer =

English actress (born 1989)

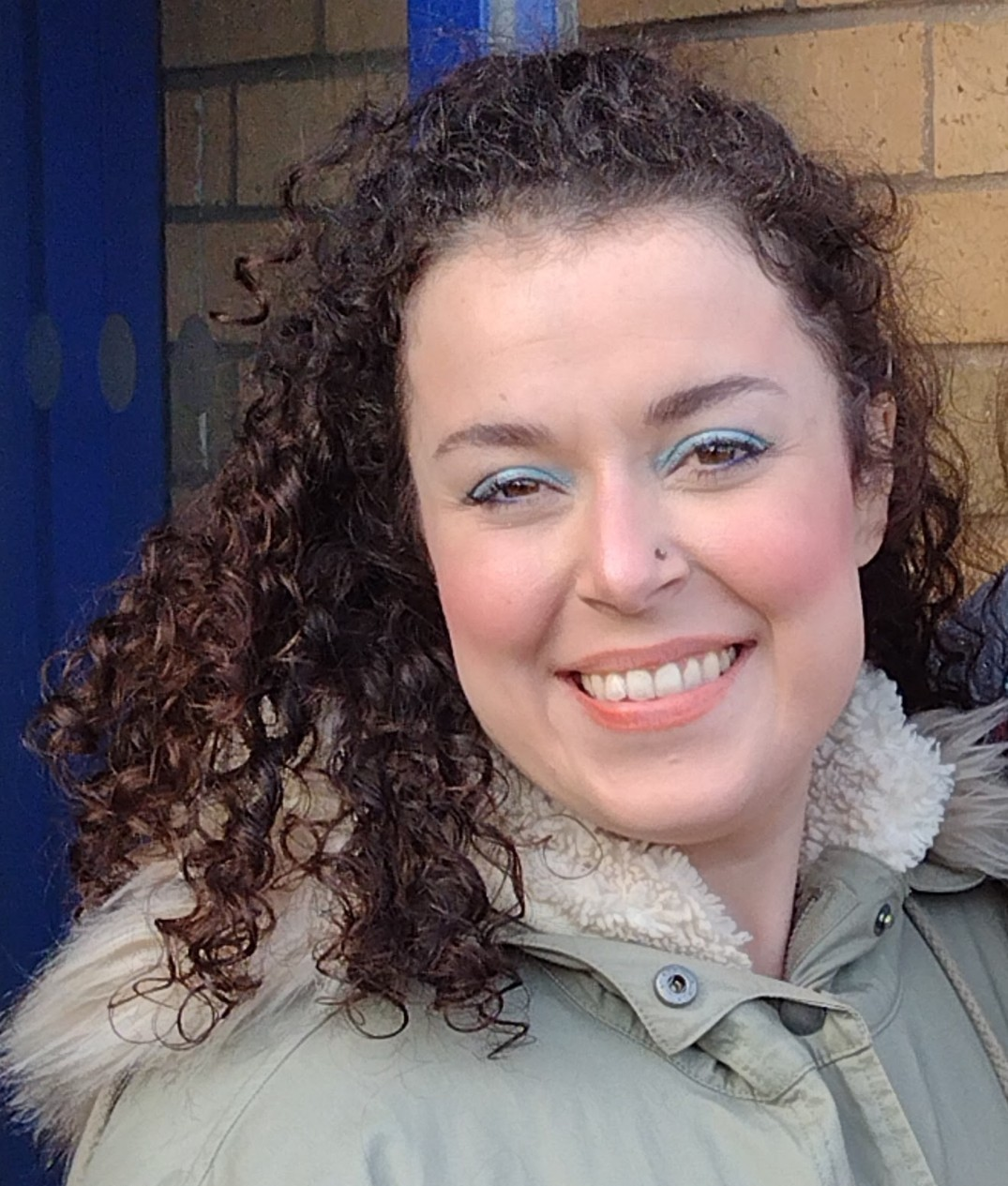
- Harmer in 2024
- Born: Danielle Jane Harmer; 8 February 1989 (age 37); Bracknell, Berkshire, England
- Occupations: Actress; television personality
- Years active: 1995–present
- Organization: The Dani Harmer Academy
- Agent: Allex Mann
- Partner: Simon Brough (2015–present)
- Children: 2
- Website: daniharmeracademy.com

Danielle Jane Harmer (born 8 February 1989) is an English actress, television personality, and former singer. She is best known for her lead role as Tracy Beaker in the CBBC series The Story of Tracy Beaker (2002–2006), Tracy Beaker Returns (2010–2012), for which she was nominated for a BAFTA in 2010, The Tracy Beaker Survival Files (2011–2012), My Mum Tracy Beaker (2021), and The Beaker Girls (2022–2023).

Harmer played the role of Molly Louise Venables in the BBC One comedy series After You've Gone (2007–2008). She starred in her own CBBC sitcom Dani's House (2008–2012), which received several awards and nominations from BAFTA Kids, and its spin-off Dani's Castle (2013–2014). Harmer also occasionally presented Friday Download and continuity clips for CBBC.

In 2008, Harmer branched into the music industry and signed a £3m record deal with Universal Group. She recorded her debut studio album, Superheroes, in September 2009, and released the single and theme from Dani's House, "Free", but the album was never released and it was later confirmed she had abandoned her music career indefinitely.

In 2012, Harmer competed in the fourth series of Let's Dance for Sport Relief alongside Tyger Drew-Honey, in which they both finished as joint runners-up. Later that year, she competed in the tenth series of Strictly Come Dancing, partnered with Vincent Simone, reaching the final and finishing in fourth place.

In 2022, Harmer directed scenes of The Beaker Girls, and in 2024 she directed her first full episode of The Dumping Ground, going on to direct their online content the following series.

== Early life ==
Danielle Jane Harmer was born and raised in her hometown Bracknell, Berkshire, to parents Jill, a former legal worker and children's casting agent, and Andy Harmer, a mechanic and chauffeur. Her parents are now divorced. She has a younger sister named Betsy, who works as a hairdresser. From the age of five, Harmer attended Stagecoach drama lessons. Harmer won a scholarship to attend Redroofs Theatre School at the age of seven, and left with three GCSEs. Harmer's educational achievements beyond GCSEs are unknown.

== Career ==
Harmer made her stage debut at the age of six in the musical The Who's Tommy in the West End. She has appeared in a number of pantomimes: Dolly Mixture in Snow White (2004), the title character in Peter Pan (2005, Alban Arena, 2006 in Worthing and 2010 in High Wycombe), Dick Whittington (2007, Wolverhampton Grand Theatre) and the title role in Cinderella alongside Joe Tracini (2012, York Barbican) to name a few. She appeared as an extra in Harry Potter and the Philosopher's Stone. Her big break arrived when she landed the title role in CBBC's dramedy series The Story of Tracy Beaker, in which she starred for five series, and in the accompanying feature-length film Tracy Beaker's Movie of Me.

Her other TV credits include the ITV drama series Trial & Retribution, My Family, Pie in the Sky, The 10th Kingdom, Beast, Touch Me, I'm Karen Taylor, "Beep Beep" in the British television series The Beeps, and the pilot for Coming of Age. She was one of the presenters known as "packers" in the 2006 series of the Saturday morning show Mighty Truck of Stuff.

In November 2008, The Guardian reported that After You've Gone was to be cancelled by the BBC, due to ITV moving Coronation Street to the same slot on ITV1. The BBC had announced a fourth series of the show in January of that year to be aired in 2009; however, the series ended with a Christmas special in 2008.

In 2008, Harmer signed a record deal with record label Universal/Decca worth £3 million, under the management of Daniel Glatman, some time before beginning work on her debut album. The album was recorded and written in 2008 with the help of producer and songwriter Tom Nichols, and entitled Superheroes. The album's lead and only single "Free" was released on 25 May 2009, after becoming the theme song of the TV show Dani's House, in which Harmer plays the lead role. The song reached number 117 on the Official Chart. "Free" was featured on the compilation album Pop Princesses 2009. The scheduled release date of Superheroes was October 2009, which was later pushed back to early 2010. Rumours circulated that the album had been cancelled by Harmer's record company due to poor sales of the lead single, she responded that "they are just waiting for the right time to release it". No further comment was made until mid-2012, when Harmer stated via Twitter that she had given up music because she wanted to focus on her acting career. The album never surfaced, but the artwork and 30-second previews of each track were released in early 2010, along with the track list. The song is still available to stream on Spotify.

Harmer returned to the role of Tracy Beaker in early 2010 in the 13-episode BBC series Tracy Beaker Returns, in which her character had developed into a care worker and had written an autobiography about what life is like for children in care. Three series aired of Tracy Beaker Returns. It concluded on 23 March 2012, due to Harmer deciding to quit her role as Tracy. A spin-off was created called The Dumping Ground but did not feature her, though she did return for two episodes at the end of series 6, and one episode in series 13 for a cameo appearance. She then starred in another TV show called Dani's Castle, a spin-off from Dani's House. This aired at the start of 2013 and ended in 2015.

Harmer was due to star as Jane in Disco Inferno, which was planned to tour across the UK in autumn 2012. However, it was announced on 5 September 2012, after an investor pulled out, that the musical had been cancelled. Harmer confirmed via her Twitter account on the same day that she would be a contestant on the upcoming tenth series of Strictly Come Dancing.

She portrayed Janet in the 2013 UK tour of the stage production The Rocky Horror Show.

In 2018, Harmer joined 26 other celebrities and performed an original Christmas song called Rock With Rudolph, written and produced by Grahame and Jack Corbyn. The song was recorded in aid of Great Ormond Street Hospital and was released digitally on independent record label Saga Entertainment on 30 November 2018 under the artist name The Celebs. The music video debuted exclusively with The Sun on 29 November 2018, and had its first TV showing on Good Morning Britain on 30 November 2018. The song peaked at number two on the iTunes pop chart.

In 2020, it was announced that Harmer would be reprising the role of Tracy Beaker in the 2021 CBBC series, My Mum Tracy Beaker. It follows Tracy as a single mother and is based around her relationship with her 10 year-old daughter Jess (Emma Maggie Davies).

In 2022, Harmer assisted with directing on The Beaker Girls alongside her acting role, going on to make her director debut with a full episode of The Dumping Ground in 2025.

Between July and November 2024 she recapped her time on Tracy Beaker in a YouTube miniseries with former co-star Chelsie Padley. Other members of the cast also featured in certain episodes.

In September 2025, Harmer was announced to appear in the seventh series of RuPaul's Drag Race UK as a special celebrity guest during a makeover challenge (episode "The Hun Makeover").

The Dani Harmer Academy is a performing arts academy founded and run by Harmer in Berkshire. The academy offers educational classes such as drama, dance and singing, for children and young people. Harmer is also an acting coach at the academy.

== Personal life ==
On 28 June 2016, Harmer gave birth to her daughter, Avarie-Belle Betsy Rachel Brough. In August 2021, Harmer and her partner Simon Brough announced that she was pregnant with their second child. On 7 February 2022, Harmer gave birth to her son, Rowan León James Brough.

Harmer made a political remark in 2019 after filming a video where she adapted her Tracy Beaker line into "Bog off Tories!" She expressed her support for the Labour Party through a tweet stating: "Off to vote Labour." She has expressed support for transgender people on social media app Threads.

== Filmography ==
=== Film ===
Year	Title	Role	Notes
2001	Harry Potter and the Philosopher's Stone	Hogwarts Student	Uncredited
2009	Waiting in Rhyme	Miss Yates – Single Mother	Short film
2011	The Itch of the Golden Nit	Crazy Daisy (voice)	Short film

=== Television ===
Year	Title	Role	Notes
1997	Pie in the Sky	Twin (Lessy)	Episode: "The Apprentice"
1999–2002	Trial & Retribution	Amy Walker	4 episodes
2000	The 10th Kingdom	Merrypip Girl	Mini-series; 1 episode
2001	Beast	Emily	Episode: "Lamb"
2002–2006	The Story of Tracy Beaker	Tracy Beaker	Lead role (series 1–4); recurring role (series 5)
2003	My Family	Trick or Treater	Episode: "Friday the 31st"
2003	Sleeping Beauty Uncovered	Good Fairy	Television film
2004	Tracy Beaker: The Movie of Me	Tracy Beaker	Television film
2005	Celebrity Weakest Link	Herself	Contestant (Christmas Special)
2005–2006	Dick & Dom in da Bungalow	Herself	3 episodes
2006	The Children's Party at the Palace	Tracy Beaker	Television Special
2006	Mighty Truck of Stuff	Packer	Episode: "Mum's Off"
2007	Coming of Age	Chloe	Pilot episode
2007	SMart	Herself	Guest presenter; 1 episode
2007	Touch Me I'm Karen Taylor	Various	Unknown episodes
2007–2008	The Beeps	Beep Beep (voice)	Series 1 & 2; 45 episodes
2007–2008	After You've Gone	Molly Venables	Main role (series 1–3; 25 episodes)
2008–2012	Dani's House	Dani / Co-ordinator Zark	Lead role (series 1–5; 65 episodes)
2010	Little Crackers	Young Jo (voice)	Episode: "Jo Brand's Little Cracker: Goodbye Fluff"
2010	My Life	Herself	Narrator, episode: "Billboard Kids"
2010–2012	The Wright Stuff	Herself	Panellist; 7 episodes
2010–2012	Tracy Beaker Returns	Tracy Beaker	Lead role (series 1–3)
2011	Tracy Beaker Survival Files	Tracy Beaker	Lead role (13 episodes)
2011	Friday Download	Herself	Guest presenter, 4 episodes
2011	Hacker Time	Herself	Episode: "Dani Harmer"
2012	Strictly Come Dancing	Herself	Contestant; 4th place
2012	Pointless Celebrities	Herself	Contestant, series 2; episode 6
2013	Walk on the Wild Side	Herself	Guest presenter; 1 episode
2013–2014	Dani's Castle	Dani	Lead role; also associate producer (series 1 & 2; 26 episodes)
2014	Let's Dance for Sport Relief	Herself	Contestant; runner-up
2015	Pointless Celebrities	Herself	Contestant, series 7; episode 7: "The Noughties"
2015	Sarah & Duck	Rainbow's Niece (voice)	Episode: "Rainbow's Niece"
2018	The Chase: Celebrity Special	Herself	Contestant; 1 episode
2018–2021	Saturday Mash-Up!	Herself	4 episodes
2018	The Dumping Ground	Tracy Beaker	Series 6; episodes 23 & 24
2019	Secret Life of Boys	Herself	Episode: "Chris and Tell"
2020	Pointless Celebrities	Herself	Contestant, series 12; episode 16: "Children's TV"
2020	Celebrity Come Dine with Me	Herself	5 episodes
2021	My Mum Tracy Beaker	Tracy Beaker	Main role (3 episodes)
2021	Ricky Wilson's Art Jam	Herself	Episode: "Dani Harmer"
2021–2023	The Beaker Girls	Tracy Beaker	Main role (series 1 & 2; 17 episodes)
2022	Celebrity Mastermind	Herself	Contestant; 1 episode
2022	Kids' TV: The Surprising Story	Herself	Television Special
2025	The Dumping Ground	Tracy Beaker	Series 13; episode 6
2025	The Dumping Ground	Director	Series 13; episode 8 (main); episode 9 (assistant)
2025	Richard Osman's House of Games	Herself	Contestant, 5 episodes
2025	RuPaul's Drag Race UK	Herself	Special guest / makeover guest; (series 7; 1 episode)

== Theatre ==
Year	Title	Role	Location
1995	The Who's Tommy	Tommy	West End Theatre
1999	Annie	July	West End
2004	Snow White	Dolly Mixture	Pantomime; The Cresset
2005	The Wizard of Oz	Scraps Doll	UK Tour
2005	Peter Pan	Peter Pan	Pantomime; Alban Arena
2006	The Wizard of Oz	Dorothy	Pantomime; Central Theatre, Chatham
2006	Peter Pan	Peter Pan	Pantomime; The Hawth
2007	Dick Whittington	Spirit of the Bells	Pantomime; Grand Theatre, Wolverhampton
2010	The Wizard of Oz	Dorothy	Pantomime; UK Tour
2010	Peter Pan	Peter Pan	Pantomime; Wycombe Swan
2011	The Wizard of Oz	Dorothy	Pantomime; Ipswich Regent
2012	The Wizard of Oz	Dorothy	Pantomime; UK Tour
2012	Cinderella	Cinderella	Pantomime; York Barbican
2013	The Wizard of Oz	Dorothy	Pantomime; UK Tour
2013	The Rocky Horror Show	Janet	UK Tour
2013	Jack and the Beanstalk	Princess Tamara	Pantomime; The Hexagon
2014	Peter Pan	Wendy	Pantomime; UK Tour
2014	Cinderella	Cinderella	Pantomime; Theatre Royal, Bath
2015	Beauty and the Beast	Belle	Pantomime; UK Tour
2015	Treasure Island	Marilyn the Mermaid	Pantomime; Royal Hippodrome
2015	Cinderella	Cinderella	Pantomime; Assembly Hall
2016	The Wizard of Oz	Dorothy	Pantomime; UK Tour
2016	Cinderella	Cinderella	Pantomime; Bournemouth Pavillion
2017	Robin Hood	Maid Marian	Pantomime; UK Tour
2017	Jack and the Beanstalk	Jill	Pantomime; Shaw Theatre
2018	Twelfth Night	Viola	Exeter Barnfield
2018	Beauty and the Beast	Belle	Pantomime; UK Tour
2018	The Wizard of Oz	Wicked Witch of the West	Pantomime; Playhouse, Whitley Bay
2018	Snow White	Snow White	Pantomime; The Anvil, Basingstoke
2019	Peter Pan	Wendy	Pantomime; UK Tour
2021	Cinderella	Fairy Godmother	Pantomime; Theatre Royal, Bath
2023	Beauty and the Beast	Fairy Bon Bon	Pantomime; Palace Theatre, Mansfield
2024	The Wizard of Oz	Glinda	Pantomime; Grand Theatre, Swansea
2024	Beauty and the Beast	Fairy Bon Bon	Pantomime; Grand Opera House, York
2025	Beauty and the Beast	Belle	Pantomime; Playhouse, Whitley Bay
2026	Peter Pan	Tinkerbell	Pantomime; Grand Theatre, Swansea
2026	Beauty and the Beast	Fairy Cupid	Pantomime; Royal and Derngate

== Strictly Come Dancing ==
Harmer competed in the tenth series of the BBC ballroom dancing show Strictly Come Dancing, in 2012. She was paired up with Vincent Simone and the couple succeeded in reaching the grand final and finished in fourth place.

Week No.	Dance/Song	Judges' score					Result
Week No.	Dance/Song	Craig Revel Horwood	Darcey Bussell	Len Goodman	Bruno Tonioli	Total	Result
1	Waltz – "Open Arms"	5	5	6	5	21	None
2	Salsa – "Mama Do the Hump"	7	6	7	7	27	Safe
3	Foxtrot – "Over the Rainbow"	7	6	8	8	29	Safe
4	Cha Cha Cha – "Scooby-Doo"	6	6	8	7	27	Safe
5	Jive – "Dance with Me Tonight"	8	8	9	8	33	Safe
6	Tango – "Rumour Has It"	8	8	9	9	34	Safe
7	Quickstep – "You Can't Hurry Love"	9	9	9	9	36	Safe
8	Samba – "Single Ladies (Put a Ring on It)"	9	9	9	9	36	Safe
9	Viennese Waltz – "That's Amore"	8	8	9	9	34	Safe
10	Quickstep/Charleston Fusion – "Happy Feet"	9	10	9	10	38	Safe
11	American Smooth – "Haven't Met You Yet"	8	8	9	9	34	Safe
11	Argentine Tango – "Libertango"	9	9	10	10	38	Safe
12	Tango – "Rumour Has It"	9	9	9	9	36	Eliminated (4th)
12	Showdance – "Bohemian Rhapsody"	8	9	9	9	35	Eliminated (4th)

== Awards and nominations ==
Winner of the 2010 Children's BAFTA for Best Drama, Harmer was nominated for her performance as Tracy Beaker in its various incarnations, with the programme attracting a nomination in the Children's Drama Category at the 2011 RTS Awards. Harmer was nominated for a BAFTA Cymru for Best Actress for her performance in Tracy Beaker's Movie of Me. Dani's House, her own hit CBBC show received a 2009 Children's BAFTA nomination.

In 2009, Harmer received a Gold Blue Peter Badge for her role in Tracy Beaker.
