= List of The Dumping Ground episodes =

Overview of episodes

The Dumping Ground is a British children's drama series that focuses on the lives and experiences of young people and their care workers in care, broadcast on CBBC. The programme began on 4 January 2013, with one series airing each year since. As of 20 March 2026, 240 episodes of The Dumping Ground have aired.

== Series overview ==
Series	Episodes		Originally released	
Series	Episodes		First released	Last released
1	13		4 January 2013	15 March 2013
2	13		11 January 2014	28 March 2014
3	20	10	15 January 2015	13 March 2015
3	20	10	6 October 2015	8 December 2015
4	20	10	28 January 2016	25 March 2016
4	20	10	29 September 2016	2 December 2016
5	22	12	20 January 2017	31 March 2017
5	22	10	12 October 2017	15 December 2017
6	24	12	11 January 2018	30 March 2018
6	24	12	20 September 2018	7 December 2018
7	24	12	4 January 2019	15 March 2019
7	24	12	27 September 2019	6 December 2019
8	24	12	11 January 2020	27 March 2020
8	24	12	25 September 2020	5 February 2021
9	20	10	11 June 2021	13 August 2021
9	20	10	21 January 2022	25 March 2022
10	20	10	30 September 2022	2 December 2022
10	20	10	21 April 2023	23 June 2023
11	10		26 January 2024	22 March 2024
12	8		18 October 2024	6 December 2024
13	10		18 January 2025	21 March 2025
14	10		23 January 2026	20 March 2026

== Episodes ==
=== Series 1 (2013) ===
No. overall	No. in series	Title	Directed by	Written by	Original release date	UK viewers (millions)
1	1	"Home Alone (Freedom – Part 1)"	Craig Lines	Elly Brewer	4 January 2013	0.63
2	2	"Liberty in the DG (Freedom – Part 2)"	Craig Lines	Emma Reeves	4 January 2013	0.63
3	3	"Baby"	Craig Lines	Dawn Harrison	11 January 2013	0.68
4	4	"S.O.S."	Craig Lines	Dawn Harrison	18 January 2013	0.50
5	5	"What Would Gus Want?"	Stewart Svaasand	Elly Brewer	25 January 2013	0.63
6	6	"The Real Faith Davis"	Stewart Svaasand	Heather Imani	1 February 2013	0.55
7	7	"The Truth Is Out There"	Stewart Svaasand	Emma Reeves	8 February 2013	0.59
8	8	"Dreamland"	Stewart Svaasand	Mark Burt	15 February 2013	0.49
9	9	"A Day in the Past"	Diana Patrick	Steve Turner	22 February 2013	0.46
10	10	"Oh, Mo!"	Diana Patrick	Elly Brewer	1 March 2013	0.43
11	11	"Seriously Funny"	Diana Patrick	Matt Evans	8 March 2013	0.42
12	12	"Esme"	Diana Patrick	Nimer Rashed	15 March 2013	0.48
13	13	"Scary Beasts"	Diana Patrick	Dawn Harrison	15 March 2013	0.65

=== Series 2 (2014) ===
No. overall	No. in series	Title	Directed by	Written by	Original release date	UK viewers (millions)
15	1	"Kick Off (Booting Up – Part 1)"	Sallie Aprahamian	Elly Brewer	10 January 2014	0.57
16	2	"Quitters (Booting Up – Part 2)"	Sallie Aprahamian	Dawn Harrison	10 January 2014	0.57
17	3	"The Dumping Ground Experience"	Sallie Aprahamian	Sarah-Louise Hawkins	17 January 2014	0.32
18	4	"The Barbecue"	Sallie Aprahamian	Debbie Oates	24 January 2014	0.45
19	5	"Finding Frank"	Nigel Douglas	Emma Reeves	31 January 2014	0.30
20	6	"Holding On"	Nigel Douglas	Matt Evans	7 February 2014	0.30
21	7	"Endurance"	Nigel Douglas	Sarah-Louise Hawkins	14 February 2014	0.36
22	8	"I Have a Dream"	Diana Patrick	Julie Dixon	21 February 2014	0.34
23	9	"Sticks and Stones"	Diana Patrick	Mark Burt	28 February 2014	0.38
24	10	"G.I. Johnny"	Diana Patrick	Elly Brewer	7 March 2014	0.47
25	11	"Be My Girl"	Diana Patrick	Dawn Harrison	14 March 2014	0.36
26	12	"Hope"	Diana Patrick	Emma Reeves	21 March 2014	0.41
27	13	"Face the Music"	Diana Patrick	Elly Brewer	28 March 2014	0.30

=== Series 3 (2015) ===
No. overall	No. in series	Title	Directed by	Written by	Original release date	UK viewers (millions)
Part 1
28	1	"Party Games (Law and Disorder - Part 1)"	Roberto Bangura	Emma Reeves	16 January 2015	0.27
29	2	"Grand Theft DG (Law and Disorder - Part 2)"	Roberto Bangura	Emma Reeves	16 January 2015	0.27
30	3	"Stuck with You"	Roberto Bangura	Sarah-Louise Hawkins	23 January 2015	0.30
31	4	"Mischief"	Roberto Bangura	Dawn Harrison	30 January 2015	0.25
32	5	"Now You See Me"	Nigel Douglas	Jane Eden	6 February 2015	0.25
33	6	"It's Not About the Money"	Roberto Bangura	Julie Dixon	13 February 2015	0.25
34	7	"Fake it to Make It"	Nigel Douglas	Davey Jones	20 February 2015	0.26
35	8	"Breaking In"	Nigel Douglas	Jeff Povey	27 February 2015	0.34
36	9	"The Long Way Home"	Nigel Douglas	Matthew Leys	6 March 2015	0.27
37	10	"Dragon Slayer"	Nigel Douglas	Julie Dixon	13 March 2015	0.31
Part 2
38	11	"Three Days"	Matthew Evans	Dawn Harrison	6 October 2015	0.35
39	12	"Free to Good Home"	Matthew Evans	Dawn Harrison	13 October 2015	0.42
40	13	"Better Than You"	Matthew Evans	Dawn Harrison	20 October 2015	0.39
41	14	"Who Are You?"	Matthew Evans	Davey Jones	27 October 2015	0.35
42	15	"Where Is Love?"	Matthew Evans	Richard Lazarus	3 November 2015	0.44
43	16	"The Goodbye Girl"	Sallie Aprahamian	Jeff Povey	10 November 2015	0.26
44	17	"Something Borrowed"	Sallie Aprahamian	Sophie Petzal	17 November 2015	0.36
45	18	"What Matters?"	Sallie Aprahamian	Julie Dixon	24 November 2015	0.36
46	19	"Coming Round"	Sallie Aprahamian	Jane Eden	1 December 2015	0.31
47	20	"Refuge"	Sallie Aprahamian	Emma Reeves	8 December 2015	0.45

=== Series 4 (2016) ===
No. overall	No. in series	Title	Directed by	Written by	Original release date	UK viewers (millions)
Part 1
48	1	"Lost and Found (Slings and Arrows - Part 1)"	Sallie Aprahamian	Dawn Harrison	29 January 2016	0.38
49	2	"Bear-Faced Liar (Slings and Arrows - Part 2)"	Sallie Aprahamian	Dawn Harrison	29 January 2016	0.38
50	3	"Stepping Up"	Sallie Aprahamian	Sarah-Louise Hawkins	5 February 2016	0.45
51	4	"They Walk Among Us"	Sallie Aprahamian	Jeff Povey	12 February 2016	0.31
52	5	"Hold the Front Page"	Sallie Aprahamian	Julie Dixon	19 February 2016	0.26
53	6	"Growing Pains"	Sarah Walker	Matt Evans	26 February 2016	0.36
54	7	"Submarine"	Sarah Walker	Ian Kershaw	4 March 2016	0.27
55	8	"First Past the Post"	Sarah Walker	Matthew Leys	11 March 2016	0.26
56	9	"Survivors"	Sarah Walker	Ian Kershaw	18 March 2016	0.35
57	10	"The End of It All"	Sarah Walker	Julie Dixon	25 March 2016	0.22
Part 2
58	11	"Perfect Match"	Duncan Foster	Dawn Harrison	30 September 2016	0.29
59	12	"Doris"	Duncan Foster	Dawn Harrison	7 October 2016	0.27
60	13	"Risky Business"	Duncan Foster	Jessica Lea	14 October 2016	0.37
61	14	"Troll (Note: On screen, the episode was titled "I Troll" for an unknown reason.)"	Duncan Foster	Owen Lloyd-Fox	21 October 2016	0.19
62	15	"It Takes Two"	Duncan Foster	Sarah-Louise Hawkins	28 October 2016	0.20
63	16	"Getting To Know You"	Noreen Kershaw	Matt Evans	4 November 2016	0.20
64	17	"Two Camps"	Noreen Kershaw	James Gillam-Smith	11 November 2016	0.21
65	18	"How to Be Perfect"	Noreen Kershaw	Nick Leather	18 November 2016	0.35
66	19	"One for Sorrow"	Noreen Kershaw	Ian Kershaw	25 November 2016	0.25
67	20	"Two for Joy"	Noreen Kershaw	Ian Kershaw	2 December 2016	0.23

=== Series 5 (2017) ===
No. overall	No. in series	Title	Directed by	Written by	Original release date	UK viewers (millions)
Part 1
68	1	"Miscreants, Robots and Bullies (Back in the Game - Part 1)"	Duncan Foster	Dawn Harrison	20 January 2017	0.24
69	2	"Back in the Game (Back in the Game - Part 2)"	Duncan Foster	Dawn Harrison	20 January 2017	0.24
70	3	"One Giant Leap"	Duncan Foster	Owen Lloyd-Fox	27 January 2017	0.23
71	4	"The Fairytale Princess"	Duncan Foster	Owen Lloyd-Fox and Jessica Lea	3 February 2017	0.21
72	5	"Sittin' in a Tree"	Delyth Thomas	Sarah-Louise Hawkins	10 February 2017	0.27
73	6	"Faking It"	Delyth Thomas	Matt Evans	17 February 2017	0.17
74	7	"Sasha Bellman P.I."	Delyth Thomas	Jeff Povey	24 February 2017	0.20
75	8	"Belief"	Delyth Thomas	Ian Kershaw	3 March 2017	0.20
76	9	"Vox Populi"	Jordan Hogg	Gareth Sergeant	10 March 2017	0.19
77	10	"Free"	Jordan Hogg	Ian Kershaw	17 March 2017	0.21
78	11	"The Wardrobe"	Jordan Hogg	Jeff Povey	24 March 2017	0.16
79	12	"Farvel"	Jordan Hogg	Ian Kershaw	31 March 2017	0.16
Part 2
80	13	"Choose Your Own Adventure"	David Innes Edwards	Owen Lloyd-Fox	13 October 2017	0.25
81	14	"Making Waves"	David Innes Edwards	Ella Greenhill	20 October 2017	0.19
82	15	"The Phantom of Ashdene Ridge"	David Innes Edwards	Vincent Lund & Matthew Cooke	27 October 2017	0.24
83	16	"The Switch"	David Innes Edwards	Sarah-Louise Hawkins	3 November 2017	0.23
84	17	"Mission Totally Possible"	Simon Massey	Keith Brumpton	10 November 2017	—
85	18	"Sick"	Simon Massey	Kim Millar	17 November 2017	0.24
86	19	"Rough Justice"	Simon Massey	Matt Evans	24 November 2017	0.18
87	20	"Where You Belong"	Simon Massey	Furquan Akhtar	1 December 2017	0.23
88	21	"#SaveTheDG"	Steve Brett	Dawn Harrison	8 December 2017	0.23
89	22	"What Lies Beneath"	Steve Brett	Dawn Harrison	15 December 2017	0.25

=== Series 6 (2018) ===
No. overall	No. in series	Title	Directed by	Written by	Original release date	UK viewers (millions)
Part 1
91	1	"Jody on the Ropes"	David Innes Edwards	Dawn Harrison	12 January 2018	0.29
92	2	"Saved by the Bell"	David Innes Edwards	Dawn Harrison	19 January 2018	0.22
93	3	"Give and Take"	David Innes Edwards	Sarah-Louise Hawkins	26 January 2018	—
94	4	"Heroes"	David Innes Edwards	Ian Kershaw	2 February 2018	0.22
95	5	"SorryNotSorry"	Fiona Walton	Kim Millar	9 February 2018	—
96	6	"Cat's in the Cradle"	Fiona Walton	Mark Stevenson	16 February 2018	0.25
97	7	"Challenging Times"	Fiona Walton	Keith Brumpton	23 February 2018	0.25
98	8	"Two Sides to Every Story"	Fiona Walton	Keith Brumpton	2 March 2018	0.19
99	9	"Utopia"	Dave Beauchamp	Gareth Sergeant	9 March 2018	0.22
100	10	"The Lurgy"	Dave Beauchamp	Owen Lloyd-Fox	16 March 2018	0.15
101	11	"RyanMan"	Dave Beauchamp	Jeff Povey	23 March 2018	0.21
102	12	"Holding Out for a Hero"	Dave Beauchamp	Jeff Povey	30 March 2018	0.21
Part 2
103	13	"Stuck"	Sean Glynn	Kim Millar	14 September 2018	0.20
104	14	"The Secret"	Sean Glynn	Suzanne Cowie	21 September 2018	0.20
105	15	"Bird's Song"	David Innes Edwards	Marissa Lestrade	28 September 2018	0.17
106	16	"Home"	Sean Glynn	Furquan Akhtar	5 October 2018	0.19
107	17	"Faker"	Sean Glynn	Dawn Harrison	12 October 2018	0.20
108	18	"Me, Myself and I"	Mark Reynaud	Mark Stevenson	19 October 2018	0.25
109	19	"Jay and Bird's Day Off"	Jamie Annett	Gareth Sergeant	26 October 2018	0.16
110	20	"Wasters"	Jamie Annett	Rachel Smith	2 November 2018	0.18
111	21	"Joyless Division"	Alex Jacob	Keith Brumpton	9 November 2018	0.22
112	22	"No Escaping"	Alex Jacob	John Hickman	16 November 2018	0.20
113	23	"To Have and Not to Hold"	Jamie Annett	Jeff Povey	30 November 2018	0.28
114	24	"Missing Presumed Single"	Jamie Annett	Jeff Povey	7 December 2018	0.31

=== Series 7 (2019) ===
No. overall	No. in series	Title	Directed by	Written by	Original release date	UK viewers (millions)
Part 1
115	1	"Rage"	David Beauchamp	Gareth Sergeant	4 January 2019	0.28
116	2	"Five Doors"	David Beauchamp	Gareth Sergeant	4 January 2019	0.22
117	3	"The Lone Ranger"	Tracey Larcombe	Mark Stevenson	11 January 2019	0.20
118	4	"Face Your Fear"	David Beauchamp	Suzanne Cowie	18 January 2019	0.21
119	5	"Run the Risk"	David Beauchamp	John Hickman	25 January 2019	0.21
120	6	"Candi-Rose?"	Tracey Larcombe	Colin Steven	1 February 2019	0.21
121	7	"The Return of the Freaky Twins"	Tracey Larcombe	Dawn Harrison	8 February 2019	0.25
122	8	"Snake"	Tracey Larcombe	Kim Millar	15 February 2019	0.18
123	9	"Three's a Crowd"	Gary Williams	Christine Robertson	22 February 2019	0.20
124	10	"A Mother's Love"	Gary Williams	Kayleigh Llewellyn	1 March 2019	0.26
125	11	"2 + 2 = 5"	Gary Williams	Keith Brumpton	8 March 2019	0.21
126	12	"There's a Million Ways to Say Goodbye"	Gary Williams	Jeff Povey	15 March 2019	0.22
Part 2
127	13	"The Boss"	Steve Brett	Joe Williams	27 September 2019	0.21
128	14	"The Movie Business"	Steve Brett	John Hickman	4 October 2019	0.16
129	15	"Two Hands, Four Hands"	Steve Brett	David Chikwe	11 October 2019	0.24
130	16	"Letting Go"	Steve Brett	Suzanne Cowie	18 October 2019	0.18
131	17	"Tyler Means Business"	Nicole Volavka	Claire Miller	25 October 2019	0.14
132	18	"Go Fish"	Hildegard Ryan	Julie Dixon	1 November 2019	0.22
133	19	"King Of Comedy"	Nicole Volavka	Kim Millar	8 November 2019	0.13>
134	20	"Champions"	Nicole Volavka	Gareth Sergeant	15 November 2019	0.18
135	21	"Another Planet"	Nicole Volavka	Rachel Smith	22 November 2019	0.20
136	22	"Reunion"	Amanda Mealing	Owen Lloyd-Fox	29 November 2019	0.22
137	23	"Mighty Mike Milligan"	Alex Jacob	Jeff Povey	6 December 2019	0.19
138	24	"The Last Dance"	Alex Jacob	Jeff Povey	6 December 2019	0.17

=== Series 8 (2020-21) ===
No. overall	No. in series	Title	Directed by	Written by	Original release date	UK viewers (millions)
Part 1
139	1	"Natural Selection"	Nicole Volavka	Julie Dixon	10 January 2020	0.15
140	2	"Follow My Leader"	Nicole Volavka	Dawn Harrison	17 January 2020	0.15
141	3	"Auld Lang Syne"	Nicole Volavka	Claire Miller	24 January 2020	0.17
142	4	"Somebody"	Nicole Volavka	Rachel Smith	31 January 2020	0.15
143	5	"Sugar and Spice"	Sean Glynn	Christine Robertson	7 February 2020	0.14
144	6	"Love Hearts And Roses"	Sean Glynn	John Hickman	14 February 2020	0.17
145	7	"A Matter of Life and Debt"	Sean Glynn	Anthony MacMurray	21 February 2020	0.16
146	8	"Risk"	Sean Glynn	Gareth Sergeant	28 February 2020	0.19
147	9	"The Replacement"	Alex Jacob	Hannah George	6 March 2020	0.13
148	10	"Do the Right Thing"	Alex Jacob	Suzanne Cowie	13 March 2020	0.11
149	11	"Trouble in Paradise"	Alex Jacob	Claire Miller	20 March 2020	0.16
150	12	"Go Your Own Way"	Alex Jacob	Mark Stevenson	27 March 2020	0.13
Part 2
151	13	"What's Mine Is Mine"	John Howlett	Zoe Lister	25 September 2020	0.08
152	14	"Shattered"	John Howlett	Matt Sinclair	2 October 2020	0.09
153	15	"Keeping Face"	Hildegard Ryan	Dawn Harrison	9 October 2020	0.08
154	16	"Everybody Needs a Friend"	Hildegard Ryan	Dare Aiyegbayo	16 October 2020	0.10>
155	17	"Truth or Scare"	John Howlett	Jeff Povey and Anthony MacMurray	23 October 2020	0.10>
156	18	"Sasha Claus"	Gary Williams	Gareth Sergeant	11 December 2020	0.08>
157	19	"Great Expectations"	Hildegard Ryan	Hannah George	8 January 2021	0.09
158	20	"Snakes and Ladders"	Vicki Kisner	David Chikwe	15 January 2021	0.13>
159	21	"Nobody's Perfect"	Hildegard Ryan	Kim Millar	22 January 2021	0.10>
160	22	"Broken Record"	Gary Williams	Asher Pirie	29 January 2021	0.10>
161	23	"Far From The Tree"	Gary Williams	Christine Robertson	5 February 2021	0.10
162	24	"Dream Life"	Gary Williams	John Hickman	5 February 2021	0.11

=== Series 9 (2021-22) ===
u

No. overall	No. in series	Title	Directed by	Written by	Original release date	UK viewers (millions)
Part 1
163	1	"Moment of Truth"	Diana Patrick	Julia Kent	11 June 2021	0.06>
164	2	"Sweet and Sour"	Diana Patrick	Kim Millar	18 June 2021	0.11
165	3	"The Remote"	Diana Patrick	Jeff Povey	25 June 2021	0.10
166	4	"The Diwata of Ogleton Wood"	Diana Patrick	Paul Campbell	2 July 2021	0.11>
167	5	"Old Friends"	Diana Patrick	Hannah George	9 July 2021	0.10>
168	6	"Partners in Crime"	Sean Glynn	Scott Payne	16 July 2021	0.10
169	7	"Festival Fibber"	Sean Glynn	Niki Rooney	23 July 2021	0.07>
170	8	"Losing Your Cool"	Sunny Bahia	John Hickman	30 July 2021	0.08
171	9	"Memory Lane"	Sean Glynn	Zoë Lister	6 August 2021	0.07>
172	10	"Run, Rescue, Repeat"	Sean Glynn	Dawn Harrison	13 August 2021	0.06>
Part 2
173	11	"Saviour"	Vicki Kisner	Rachel Smith	21 January 2022	0.12>
174	12	"Friend Zone"	Vicki Kisner	Joseph Lidster	28 January 2022	0.10>
175	13	"Face to Face"	Paul Riordan	Christine Robertson	4 February 2022	0.10>
176	14	"Finders Keepers"	Paul Riordan	Robert Butler	11 February 2022	0.07>
177	15	"The Beat Goes On"	Vicki Kisner	Dare Aiyegbayo	18 February 2022	0.08>
178	16	"The Brothers Murray"	Paul Riordan	Matt Sinclair	25 February 2022	0.07>
179	17	"Rocket Man"	Vicki Kisner	Claire Miller	4 March 2022	0.08>
180	18	"Stand Up"	Alex Browning	Mark Boutros	11 March 2022	0.09>
181	19	"The Master Plan"	Paul Riordan	Owen Lloyd-Fox	18 March 2022	N/A
182	20	"Breaking Chains"	Paul Riordan	Ciara Conway	25 March 2022	N/A

=== Series 10 (2022-23) ===
No. overall	No. in series	Title	Directed by	Written by	Original release date	UK viewers (millions)
Part 1
183	1	"A Hole New Start"	Lee Skelly	Dawn Harrison	30 September 2022	N/A
184	2	"Over and Out"	Lee Skelly	Dawn Harrison	7 October 2022	N/A
185	3	"We Aren't Family"	Lee Skelly	Hannah George	14 October 2022	N/A
186	4	"My Greatest Composition"	Lee Skelly	Thabo Mhlatshwa	21 October 2022	N/A
187	5	"Frogs On A Train"	Daymon Britton	Kat Rose-Martin	28 October 2022	N/A
188	6	"Take Flight"	Daymon Britton	Sameera Steward	4 November 2022	N/A
189	7	"The Real Candi-Rose"	Daymon Britton	Julia Kent	11 November 2022	N/A
190	8	"The Dodo"	Daymon Britton	Wally Jiagoo	18 November 2022	N/A
191	9	"Trapped"	David Innes Edwards	Paul Gerstenberger	25 November 2022	N/A
192	10	"The Hardest Word"	David Innes Edwards	Rachel Smith	2 December 2022	N/A
Part 2
193	11	"Under New Management"	Stephanie Zari	Scott Payne	21 April 2023	N/A
194	12	"The Mole Hunt"	Stephanie Zari	Scott Payne	28 April 2023	N/A
195	13	"Natural Habitat"	David Innes Edwards	Rob Kinsman	5 May 2023	N/A
196	14	"Karma Drama Queen"	Richard Johnstone	Jeff Povey	12 May 2023	N/A
197	15	"Intergalactic"	Stephanie Zari	Jane Wainwright	19 May 2023	N/A
198	16	"Sister to Sister"	Stephanie Zari	Gemma Mushington	26 May 2023	N/A
199	17	"Mother's Day"	Duncan Foster	Matthew Leys	2 June 2023	N/A
200	18	"Life Is What You Bake It"	Duncan Foster	Jordan Barrett	9 June 2023	N/A
201	19	"The Monster Within"	Duncan Foster	Niki Rooney	16 June 2023	N/A
202	20	"Bright Sparks"	Duncan Foster	Keith Brumpton	23 June 2023	N/A

=== Series 11 (2024) ===
No. overall	No. in series	Title	Directed by	Written by	Original release date	UK viewers (millions)
203	1	"Welcome Home"	Daymon Britton	Paul Rose	26 January 2024	N/A
204	2	"I Can Explain"	Lee Skelly	Rob Evans	2 February 2024	N/A
205	3	"Imagine"	Lee Skelly	Jane Wainwright	9 February 2024	N/A
206	4	"Seeing Red"	Lee Skelly	Rob Evans	16 February 2024	N/A
207	5	"Likes"	Lee Skelly	Omar Khan	23 February 2024	N/A
208	6	"Mum's the Word"	Daymon Britton	Jordan Barrett	1 March 2024	N/A
209	7	"Coming Clean"	Daymon Britton	Ciaran Cruickshank	8 March 2024	N/A
210	8	"Big Little Fibs"	Daymon Britton	Tony Cooke	15 March 2024	N/A
211	9	"Fly Away Home"	Duncan Foster	Martin Jameson & Ali Taylor	22 March 2024	N/A
212	10	"Bring the House Down"	Duncan Foster	Ali Taylor	22 March 2024	N/A

=== Series 12 (2024) ===
No. overall	No. in series	Title	Directed by	Written by	Original release date	UK viewers (millions)
213	1	"The Tooth Fairy"	Duncan Foster	Paul Gerstenberger	18 October 2024	N/A
214	2	"Picnic 'n' Mix"	David Innes Edwards	Ali Taylor	25 October 2024	N/A
215	3	"Trouble Doubled"	Meg Campbell	Martin Jameson & Sergio Casci	1 November 2024	N/A
216	4	"Same but Different"	Meg Campbell	Omar Khan & Martin Jameson	8 November 2024	N/A
217	5	"Best Day Ever"	Meg Campbell	Ali Taylor	15 November 2024	N/A
218	6	"Swapsies"	David Innes Edwards	Niki Rooney	22 November 2024	N/A
219	7	"The Howling"	David Innes Edwards	Chris Grady	29 November 2024	N/A
220	8	"Day Trip"	David Innes Edwards	Julia Kent	6 December 2024	N/A

=== Series 13 (2025) ===
No. overall	No. in series	Title	Directed by	Written by	Original release date	UK viewers (millions)
221	1	"The Wild Card"	Alexander Jacob	Lydia Rynne	17 January 2025	N/A
222	2	"Bonnie Rides Again"	Alexander Jacob	Paul Gerstenberger	17 January 2025	N/A
223	3	"WrestlePalooza"	Alexander Jacob	Omar Khan	24 January 2025	N/A
224	4	"Game Over"	Alexander Jacob	Christine Robertson	31 January 2025	N/A
225	5	"The Right Place"	Jordan Hogg	Jayshree Patel	7 February 2025	N/A
226	6	"The Magician’s Oath"	Jordan Hogg	Lydia Rynne	14 February 2025	N/A
227	7	"Chaos and Confessions"	Jordan Hogg	Jon Macqueen	21 February 2025	N/A
228	8	"Tangled"	Dani Harmer	Matilda Feyisayo Ibini & Lydia Rynne	28 February 2025	N/A
229	9	"Camp Mayhem"	Sean Glynn	Shazia Rashid	7 March 2025	N/A
230	10	"Sister Trap"	Sean Glynn	Emma Pritchard	14 March 2025	N/A

=== Series 14 (2026) ===
No. overall	No. in series	Title	Directed by	Written by	Original release date	UK viewers (millions)
231	1	"Skid Row"	Claire Tailyour	Jon Macqueen	23 January 2026	N/A
232	2	"Prison Rules"	Claire Tailyour	Mark Oswin	23 January 2026	N/A
233	3	"Monkey Business"	Claire Tailyour	Emma Pritchard	30 January 2026	N/A
234	4	"Gifted"	Claire Tailyour	Omar Khan	6 February 2026	N/A
235	5	"Pantpocalypse"	Claire Tailyour	Lydia Rynne	13 February 2026	N/A
236	6	"The Siege of Porter's Lodge"	Jason Wingard	Jon Macqueen	20 February 2026	N/A
237	7	"Out of Bounds"	Jason Wingard	Shazia Rashid	27 February 2026	N/A
238	8	"Phone Alone"	Jason Wingard	Jeffrey Aidoo	6 March 2026	N/A
239	9	"Speaking Up"	Jason Wingard	Mark Oswin	13 March 2026	N/A
240	10	"Lost Girl"	Jason Wingard	Tasha Dhanraj & Jon Macqueen	20 March 2026	N/A

== Specials ==
Series	Episodes	Originally released
Jody In Wonderland		16 December 2013
Floss The Foundling		25 March 2016
Dumping Ground Island		22 December 2017
Sasha's Contact Meeting		6 April 2018
After The DG		16 July – 4 August 2018
The Joseph & Taz Files		27 August 2018

=== Jody In Wonderland (2013) ===
No. overall	Title	Directed by	Written by	Original release date	UK viewers (millions)
14	"Jody in Wonderland"	Nigel Douglas	Elly Brewer	16 December 2013	0.50
Jody is faced with a terrible dilemma when she's asked to make a witness statement against her brother Kingsley. Jody leaves Mike's office seeing a rabbit. Following the rabbit, she enters a rather unfamiliar world with strangely familiar – yet utterly different – characters. First Appearance: Stacy Liu as May Li Wang

=== Floss The Foundling (2016) ===
After the end of the episode, The End Of It All in series 4, a five-minute crossover between The Dumping Ground and Hetty Feather aired on CBBC, titled A Special Dumping Ground Adventure. Its official title (according to CBBC Online) is Floss The Foundling and has instead used this title online and in subsequent TV airings.

No. overall	Title	Directed by	Written by	Original release date
—	"Floss The Foundling"	Makalla McPherson	Matt Evans	25 March 2016
When Floss has to do the vacuuming. she ruins a picture that Tyler, Billie and Toni work on when they don't want her help. Floss falls asleep on the sofa and ends up in the Foundling Hospital. She encounters Hetty Feather, who introduces Floss to the Foundling Hospital ways. Sheila and Elizabeth are mean towards Floss and Hetty gets Floss out of trouble with Matron Bottomley. Floss and Hetty make friends. When Floss wakes up, she draws a replacement picture. Guest Starring: Isabel Clifton as Hetty Feather, Polly Allen as Sheila Ormsby, Isabelle Allen as Elizabeth and Eva Pope as Matron Bottomley

=== Dumping Ground Island (2017) ===
After the end of series 5, an hour special aired, titled Dumping Ground Island. It is filmed in the North East of England as well as Crete, Greece. It is the first episode across the Tracy Beaker franchise that has been filmed abroad.

No. overall	Title	Directed by	Written by	Original release date	UK viewers (millions)
90	"Dumping Ground Island"	David Innes Edwards	Owen Lloyd-Fox	22 December 2017	N/A
The young people talk to Tyler about their problems for the Kids in Care forum and he is pressured into solving them. May-Li is concerned about Tyler's lack of sleep over his work for his podcast and suggests he interviews the young people. Floss wants Ryan to teach her to be evil. Tyler daydreams when Jody asks for his help with her mum and Tyler tells Jody about an island he dreams he could run away to. For his podcast, Tyler insults the young people using false names and after Ryan finds Tyler's notes for the forum in the bin, Ryan distracts him away. Ryan shares the podcast recording with the young people and Tyler escapes to his room to dream about the island. Tyler finds himself on his dream island and explores, swims and climbs, but he isn't happy when Jody, Ryan, Sasha and Dexter turn up and Ryan and Jody insist Tyler is in charge to find food. Floss later arrives on the island. Ryan finds a fridge with fruit and fills up his bag, but when he returns to the young people, he refuses to share. In the cave, Tyler's laptop plays a message to him and Ryan agrees to share the food if they build the shelter. Sasha and Dexter fall out when Sasha calls Dexter names and Sasha works out Jody likes Tyler. Back at the cave, Tyler thinks he has bipolar and Ryan winds Jody up about Tyler not liking her. Jody goes to the cave and tells Tyler it's her birthday and her mum forgot. Tyler rubbishes what Ryan said and kisses Jody, which shocks her, but Jody kisses Tyler back. When Tyler snaps out of his dream, he tells Dexter that Sasha cares about him, he gets Ryan to teach Floss how to be evil and leaves Jody a birthday card.

=== Sasha's Contact Meeting (2018) ===
After the end of the first half of series 6, a five-part mini webisode series was shown on BBC iPlayer, titled Sasha's Contact Meeting. It featured Annabelle Davis as Sasha Bellman and Endy McKay as Jenny Holmes, Sasha's new social worker.

No. overall	Title	Directed by	Written by	Original release date	UK viewers (millions)
1	"Sasha's Contact Meeting: Episode 1"	Michael J Ferns	Lauren Sequeira	6 April 2018	N/A
Sasha tells her vlog viewers that she has had to miss a trip to the theme park to see her social worker, Maureen. Sasha goes to see Maureen but finds another woman there, who introduces herself as Jenny Holmes and her new social worker. Sasha insists she does not need a pathway plan as she knows what she wants to do, but tells her vlog viewers the meeting will not last long.
2	"Sasha's Contact Meeting: Episode 2"	Michael J Ferns	Lauren Sequeira	6 April 2018	N/A
Sasha tells Jenny that she feels meeting will not be worth it for her. When Jenny asks Sasha about her education, Sasha plans to study Art, but Jenny wants proper answers from Sasha. Sasha attempts to question Jenny about her being a social worker, but Jenny wants to focus on the plan. Jenny then asks Sasha about what she will do for money, but Sasha refuses to answer. When Jenny is out of the room, Sasha pours water over her documents and then wants to film her reaction, but Jenny notices the phone. Jenny insists they are going to complete the plan.
3	"Sasha's Contact Meeting: Episode 3"	Michael J Ferns	Lauren Sequeira	6 April 2018	N/A
Jenny tells Sasha she has to respect people's privacy and Sasha chooses to ignore Jenny's request by using her phone. Sasha rubbishes Jenny's belief that she is scared and tells Jenny her interests. Jenny then asks Sasha about where she will live when she has left care as she knows Sasha chose not to live with her mum, asking if she wants to live independently. Jenny brings up Sasha's anger, which is the same way she acted when she was going to live in secure accommodation, and Sasha denies she is angry.
4	"Sasha's Contact Meeting: Episode 4"	Michael J Ferns	Lauren Sequeira	6 April 2018	N/A
When Jenny tries to talk about Sasha's emotions, Sasha insists she is in control and independent and walks out of her meeting. She locks herself in her bedroom and turns up her music to get Jenny to leave her alone. Jenny leaves Sasha a note, telling her she is in the garden and an emotional Sasha destroys her canvas.
5	"Sasha's Contact Meeting: Episode 5"	Michael J Ferns	Lauren Sequeira	6 April 2018	N/A
Sasha joins Jenny in the garden and Jenny attempts to guess how Sasha feels so she talks. Sasha admits to Jenny she does and does not regret moving back in with her family, but knows it was right not to and has to be independent as well as admitting she is scared. Jenny reassures Sasha that it is normal to feel guilty about putting herself first instead of her family. Sasha also admits she misses Josh and feels like she is the same person she was when she arrived and her anger messes things up. Jenny praises Sasha for talking and encourages her to talk to people.

=== After The DG (2018) ===
After The DG, a mini webisode series, is being shown on Instagram. It featured Jessica Revell and Kasey McKellar, reprising their roles as Elektra Perkins and Bailey Wharton respectively. The series was announced in 2018 and is aimed at older fans.

No. overall	Title	Directed by	Written by	Original release date	UK viewers (millions)
1	"Elektra After The DG"	Trim Lamba	Sabrina Mahfouz	16 July 2018 – 4 August 2018	N/A
Elektra is selected as a Young Changemaker. On the scheme, Elektra struggles to fit in and is harassed by her violent ex-boyfriend, Matt. Elektra is tasked to make a short video for social media to encourage change and empower young people as part of the scheme. Elektra fails to make a blog for the scheme and she eventually decides to quit the scheme. Elektra also begins to develop feelings previously unexperienced for her former classmate Sula. Elektra has no money, but decides to take a road trip and Sula joins her. Elektra runs out of money and has no food, but cannot return to work until the cover leaves.
2	"Bailey After The DG"	Will Herbert	Emma Hill	16 July 2018 – 4 August 2018	N/A

=== The Joseph & Taz Files (2018) ===
In August 2018, a five-part mini webisode series was shown on BBC iPlayer, titled The Joseph & Taz Files. It featured Yousef Naseer as Joseph Stubbs and Jasmine Uson as Taz De Souza.

No. overall	Title	Directed by	Written by	Original release date	UK viewers (millions)
1	"The Joseph & Taz Files: Episode 1"	Will Herbert	Karrissa Hamilton-Bannis	25 August 2018	N/A
Joseph tries to video a comet, but captures strange midnight activity instead. He’s convinced it can all be explained by science, but Taz believes it’s a ghost. How will they solve the mystery?
2	"The Joseph & Taz Files: Episode 2"	Will Herbert	Karrissa Hamilton-Bannis	25 August 2018	N/A
Joseph and Taz aren’t getting along, when they find a mysterious footprint in the attic. It has them thinking there is even more to this mystery – if only they could work together to solve it
3	"The Joseph & Taz Files: Episode 3"	Will Herbert	Karrissa Hamilton-Bannis	25 August 2018	N/A
Joseph and Taz try to capture more evidence of the ‘ghost’ by setting up another camera and staging a sleepover in the attic. They almost bond before clashing again and Joseph wishes Taz would just disappear…
4	"The Joseph & Taz Files: Episode 4"	Will Herbert	Karrissa Hamilton-Bannis	25 August 2018	N/A
Joseph frantically searches for Taz, using his app and some cameras. He thinks he’s getting close when he gets a huge surprise…
5	"The Joseph & Taz Files: Episode 5"	Will Herbert	Karrissa Hamilton-Bannis	25 August 2018	N/A
The real ‘ghost’ is finally revealed and Joseph and Taz decide to forge a new partnership for the future
