= The Dumping Ground =

British children's television drama series

- Genre: Children's drama
- Based on: The Story of Tracy Beaker by Jacqueline Wilson
- Directed by: Various
- Starring: List of The Dumping Ground characters
- Theme music composer: Jeremy Holland-Smith
- Composer: Simon Rogers
- Country of origin: United Kingdom
- Original language: English
- No. of series: 14
- No. of episodes: 240 (list of episodes)

Production
- Executive producers: Foz Allan; Lis Steele; Lucy Martin; Kim Crowther; Jonathan Phillips; Jane Dauncey
- Producers: Louise Sutton; Simon Nelson; Philip Leach; Gert Thomas; Emma Bodger; Jonathan Wolfman
- Animator: David Gregory
- Camera setup: Multi-camera
- Running time: 28 minutes
- Production companies: BBC Children's Productions (2018–2022); BBC Studios Kids & Family (2022–)

Original release
- Network: CBBC (2013–present); CBBC HD (2013–present); BBC iPlayer (2024–present)
- Release: 4 January 2013 – present

Related
- The Story of Tracy Beaker; Tracy Beaker Returns; My Mum Tracy Beaker; The Beaker Girls

The Dumping Ground is a British children's television drama series that focuses on the lives and experiences of young people who live in a children's home with their care workers. The show has continuously aired on CBBC since its inception in 2013, being one of the channel's longest-running and most successful shows. The show is a continuation of Tracy Beaker Returns, which aired from 2010 to 2012. It is the third television series in the Tracy Beaker franchise.

The Dumping Ground broadcast its 100th episode on 16 March 2018, which was the tenth episode of series six.

In 2024, the eleventh series of The Dumping Ground marked a complete revamp of the show, including a new house, new title sequence and logo, and the animated sequences are no longer a part of the show, much like My Mum Tracy Beaker and The Beaker Girls.

A fourteenth series began airing on the CBBC Channel on 23 January 2026 and concluded on 27 March 2026. A fifteenth series is currently in development.

== Plot ==
The series revolves around the life of children in a care home; typically each episode follows one or more characters' life and includes subplots featuring other characters. The Dumping Ground deals with issues related to the care system as well as social issues such as friendships, family, relationships, mental health, adolescence, racism and LGBT parenting.

== Production ==
The first series, consisting of thirteen, thirty-minute episodes, was commissioned in March 2012. A second series, also with thirteen, thirty-minute episodes, was announced in May 2013. The third and fourth series, announced in 2014 and 2015 respectively, both had an increase in episodes: twenty, thirty-minute episodes. In 2018, it was confirmed that two further series, with 24 episodes in each series, would be made.

The first series was produced in summer 2012 at the former La Sagesse convent school in the Jesmond area of Newcastle-upon-Tyne which had previously been used throughout Tracy Beaker Returns. The former Fathers' house was used as the exterior of Elm Tree House, whilst the show's interior scenes were filmed in a grander building elsewhere on the same site. Property owners Barratt Homes decided to redevelop the school buildings into a luxury housing estate following the first series, preventing the BBC (and anyone else for that reason) from using the building and production was forced to move to another area of Newcastle. The recognisable cream and red exterior of Elm Tree House was demolished in March 2014 though the building used for interior scenes partially remains intact.

Between series two and four, interior scenes were filmed at the former Hookergate School in High Spen, Gateshead, which had previously been used as the Bradlington High School in CBBC series Wolfblood. A nearby children's respite care home, Kites Rise, on Smaile's Lane in Rowlands Gill doubled as the exterior of new care home Ashdene Ridge. The move was not explicitly addressed, but in the 2013 Christmas special Jody in Wonderland, residents and staff can be seen unpacking boxes and bags. The nearby housing estates in Rowlands Gill doubled as the fictional surrounding Talbot Ward area of Pottiswood, where the show is set. The exact location of Pottiswood has never been explicitly said within the programme, though landmarks such as the Tyne Bridge have been seen across the various series and characters have addressed the fact that they are in the North East of England. In Series 10, it is shown on a map to be north west of Ponteland in Northumberland. The garden exterior scenes were filmed against the back of a building at Hookergate School, and therefore did not accurately match the exterior of the front of Kites Rise.

From series five, the filming of interior care home scenes and garden scenes were moved to the former Loansdean Fire Station in Morpeth, Northumberland following Gateshead Council's decision to redevelop the Hookergate School. Kites Rise's façade continue to double as Ashdene Ridge.

Principal filming returned to the Hookergate School in series 9, and following a change of ownership at Kites Rise a replica of the building's frontage was constructed around an old caretaker's house on the school site. The replica is noticeably smaller than the real building and in wide shots the adjoining garage can be seen just to be a wooden façade. The original chimney of the caretaker's house can be seen above the Ashdene Ridge roof. This arrangement continued into series 10.

In the final episode of Series 10, Ashdene Ridge caught on fire and therefore production moved to a former middle school in Hexham for Series 11, doubling as the interior and exterior of new care home Porter's Lodge.

== Awards and nominations ==
| Ceremony | Award | Nominee | Result |
|---|---|---|---|
| 2013 Writers' Guild of Great Britain Awards | Best Children's Television Script | Elly Brewer for "What Would Gus Want?" | Won |
| 2013 Writers' Guild of Great Britain Awards | Best Children's Television Script | Emma Reeves for "The Truth is Out There" | Nominated |
| 2013 British Academy Children's Awards | Best Drama | The Dumping Ground | Won |
| 2014 British Academy Children's Awards | BAFTA Kid's Vote – Television | The Dumping Ground | Nominated |
| 2014 British Academy Children's Awards | Best Actor | Kia Pegg as Jody Jackson | Nominated |
| 2015 British Academy Children's Awards | Best Drama | The Dumping Ground | Nominated |
| 2015 British Academy Children's Awards | Interactive: Adapted in 2015 | The Dumping Ground: You're The Boss | Won |
| 2016 Royal Television Society North East and the Border Awards | Drama in 2016 | The Dumping Ground | Won |
| 2016 British Academy Children's Awards | Best Drama | The Dumping Ground | Nominated |
| 2018 Royal Television Society NETB Awards | Best Drama (Long Form) | Ian Kershaw for "Farvel" | Nominated |
| 2018 Royal Television Society NETB Awards | Performance of the Year | Annabelle Davis | Won |
| 2018 Royal Television Society NETB Awards | Performance of the Year | Lewis G Hamilton | Nominated |
| 2018 Royal Television Society NETB Awards | Rising Star | Jordan Barrett, Script Editor | Nominated |
| 2018 Royal Television Society NETB Awards | Rising Star | Rachel Smee, Make Up Trainee | Nominated |
| 2018 Royal Television Society NETB Awards | Professional Excellence – Costume and Make-up | Michael Birtley | Won |
| 2018 British Academy Children's Awards | Performer | Annabelle Davis | Nominated |
| 2019 Royal Television Society NETB Awards | Best Drama (Long Form) | Ian Kershaw for "Heroes" | Won |
| 2019 British Academy Children's Awards | Best Drama | The Dumping Ground | Nominated |
| 2019 British Academy Children's Awards | Performer | Emily Burnett | Won |
