= Tracy Beaker Returns =

British television series

- Series intertitle
- Genre: Children's Drama
- Created by: Jacqueline Wilson, and Tracy Beaker Productions Ltd
- Starring: List of Tracy Beaker series characters
- Country of origin: United Kingdom
- No. of series: 3
- No. of episodes: 39 (list of episodes)

Production
- Executive producer: Josephine Ward
- Producer: Gina Cronk
- Running time: 30 minutes

Original release
- Network: CBBC, BBC One, BBC Two
- Release: 8 January 2010 – 23 March 2012

Related
- The Story of Tracy Beaker; The Dumping Ground

Tracy Beaker Returns is a British television programme. Based upon the novels by Jacqueline Wilson, it is the sequel series to The Story of Tracy Beaker. The series stars Dani Harmer who reprised her role as protagonist Tracy Beaker. The third and final series ended on 23 March 2012. A sequel spin-off, The Dumping Ground, started airing on 4 January 2013 and it is the longest-running CBBC show.

== Premise ==
When author Tracy Beaker is arrested for using her adoptive mother Cam's credit card to publish her autobiography, she seeks refuge at Elmtree House, a care home nicknamed "The Dumping Ground" where she used to live as a child. She meets the children who are intrigued by her and her story. Wanting to pay Cam back, Tracy asks the head care worker, Mike (Connor Byrne), for a job. As Mike is short-staffed, he agrees to hire her as an assistant care worker since she knows so much about life in care. Tracy then uses her background as a former child in care to become fully involved in the children's lives.

== Production ==
The first series was produced in summer 2009, then provisionally known Beaker's Back. Set designers revamped buildings of the former La Sagesse convent school in the Jesmond area of Newcastle-upon-Tyne into the children's home, retaining the Elm Tree House name from series 5 of The Story of Tracy Beaker, despite the original series being filmed in Cardiff. The father's house was developed into the exterior of Elm Tree House, whilst the show's interior scenes were filmed in a grander building elsewhere on the same site. Classroom buildings and the Jesmond Towers were also used for scenes, as well as local landmarks such as the MetroCentre shopping centre. Production continued at La Sagesse through series two and three and into the first series of The Dumping Ground until property owners Barratt Homes decided to redevelop the school buildings into a luxury housing estate. The recognisable exterior of Elm Tree House was demolished in mid-2013 though the building used for interior scenes partially remains intact.

== Episodes ==
Series	Episodes	Originally released	
Series	Episodes	First released	Last released
1	13	8 January 2010	26 March 2010
2	13	7 January 2011	25 March 2011
3	13	6 January 2012	23 March 2012

== Ratings ==
Episode ratings from BARB.

Series	Episode No.	Airdate	Total Viewers	Series Average	CBBC Weekly Ranking	BBC iPlayer requests (Note: Up to the end of the relevant month)	Source
1	1	8 January 2010	828,000	547,000	1	565,000	
1	2	8 January 2010	828,000	547,000	1	565,000	
1	3	15 January 2010	699,000	547,000	1	—N/a	—N/a
1	4	22 January 2010	564,000	547,000	1	—N/a	—N/a
1	5	29 January 2010	594,000	547,000	1	—N/a	—N/a
1	6	5 February 2010	485,000	547,000	1	—N/a	—N/a
1	7	12 February 2010	550,000	547,000	1	—N/a	—N/a
1	8	19 February 2010	432,000	547,000	2	—N/a	—N/a
1	9	26 February 2010	423,000	547,000	1	—N/a	—N/a
1	10	5 March 2010	503,000	547,000	1	324,000	
1	11	12 March 2010	512,000	547,000	1	—N/a	—N/a
1	12	19 March 2010	447,000	547,000	2	—N/a	—N/a
1	13	26 March 2010	524,000	547,000	1	—N/a	—N/a
2	1	7 January 2011	548,000	519,000	1	451,000	
2	2	7 January 2011	548,000	519,000	1	451,000	
2	3	14 January 2011	426,000	519,000	1	—N/a	—N/a
2	4	21 January 2011	374,000	519,000	1	—N/a	—N/a
2	5	28 January 2011	482,000	519,000	1	—N/a	—N/a
2	6	4 February 2011	498,000	519,000	1	636,000	
2	7	11 February 2011	567,000	519,000	1	580,000	
2	8	18 February 2011	583,000	519,000	1	477,000	
2	9	25 February 2011	623,000	519,000	1	—N/a	—N/a
2	10	4 March 2011	611,000	519,000	1	556,000	
2	11	11 March 2011	596,000	519,000	1	625,000	
2	12	18 March 2011	463,000	519,000	1	—N/a	—N/a
2	13	25 March 2011	453,000	519,000	1	—N/a	—N/a
3	1	6 January 2012	856,000	727,000	1	756,000	
3	2	6 January 2012	856,000	727,000	1	756,000	
3	3	13 January 2012	874,000	727,000	1	688,000	
3	4	20 January 2012	856,000	727,000	1	612,000	
3	5	27 January 2012	748,000	727,000	1	—N/a	—N/a
3	6	3 February 2012	781,000	727,000	1	831,000	
3	7	10 February 2012	704,000	727,000	1	980,000	
3	8	17 February 2012	646,000	727,000	1	730,000	
3	9	24 February 2012	631,000	727,000	1	676,000	
3	10	2 March 2012	608,000	727,000	1	802,000	
3	11	9 March 2012	728,000	727,000	1	723,000	
3	12	16 March 2012	631,000	727,000	1	596,000	
3	13	23 March 2012	659,000	727,000	1	607,000	

== Development and production ==
In March 2009, the BBC announced the new 13-part series under the working title Beaker's Back!. The series was filmed in the old La Sagesse School in Jesmond, Newcastle upon Tyne in the summer of 2009, and directed by Neasa Hardiman, Craig Lines and Michael Davies.

In February 2010, it was announced that Tracy Beaker Returns would be renewed for a second series to air in 2011. Filming took place throughout summer and autumn of 2010 and premiered on 7 January 2011.

On 6 April 2010, it was announced that Classic Media's UK division (formerly known as Entertainment Rights) had picked up worldwide distribution rights to the series, with the exception of UK television rights which were retained by the BBC.

It was announced on 12 March 2011 that a third series has been commissioned to be filmed entirely in the North East. The third series later premiered on 6 January 2012.

A fourth series of Tracy Beaker Returns was supposed to be released in 2013 but, owing to Dani Harmer's decision not to return as Tracy, it was instead scrapped and reworked into The Dumping Ground, which was commissioned by CBBC in 2012, filmed over the summer of that year, and took the January 2013 release date, beginning on 4 January.

== Home media ==
All thirteen episodes of Series 1 were released as part of a two-case boxset titled "Complete Series 1 Collection", released by Universal Pictures UK and Classic Media (now DreamWorks Classics) on 23 March 2011. Series 2–3 have not seen any DVD releases.

== Awards and nominations ==
It won the Children's BAFTA award on 28 November 2010 for best drama. On the same night, Dani Harmer and Richard Wisker received nominations in the performer category. It also won a Royal Television Award in 2011, in the Children's Drama Category.

Ceremony	Award	Nominee	Result
2010 Children's BAFTA Awards	BAFTA Kids' Vote Television	Tracy Beaker Returns	Nominated
2010 Children's BAFTA Awards	Children's Drama	Tracy Beaker Returns	Won
2010 Children's BAFTA Awards	Children's Performer	Dani Harmer	Nominated
2010 Children's BAFTA Awards	Children's Performer	Richard Wisker	Nominated
2011 Children's BAFTA Awards	BAFTA Kids' Vote Television	Tracy Beaker Returns	Nominated
2011 Royal Television Awards	Children's Drama	Tracy Beaker Returns	Won
2012 Children's BAFTA Awards	BAFTA Kids' Vote Television	Tracy Beaker Returns	Nominated
2012 Children's BAFTA Awards	Children's Drama	Tracy Beaker Returns	Nominated
2012 Children's BAFTA Awards	Children's Writer	Elly Brewer	Nominated
