= Relocation =

Relocation may refer to:

- Relocation (computing)
- Relocation of professional sports teams
  - Major League Baseball relocations of 1950s–1960s
  - Relocation of professional sports teams in Australia and New Zealand
  - Relocation of professional sports teams in China
  - Relocation of professional sports teams in Europe
  - Relocation of professional sports teams in the United States and Canada
- Relocation (personal), the process of vacating a fixed residence for a different one
- Population transfer
- Rental relocation
- Structure relocation
- Car relocation

== See also ==
- Relocated
- Relocation service
- Myka Relocate
- Moving (disambiguation)
- Relocation center → Internment
