= Moving Day =

Moving Day may refer to:

== History ==
- Moving Day (Quebec), a traditional moving day in the province of Quebec
- Moving Day (New York City) or "Rent Day", a traditional moving day in New York City
- Moving Day (Boston), a traditional moving day in Boston, Massachusetts

== Culture ==
- Moving Day (painting), an 1822 work by Louis-Léopold Boilly
- Moving Day (poetry collection), a book of poetry by Ralph Fletcher
- Moving day, a golf term referring to the penultimate day of a golf tournament when competitors try to move up the leaderboard

== Films ==
- Moving Day (1936 film), a Mickey Mouse cartoon
- Moving Day (1998 film), a Canadian short film directed by Chris Deacon
- Moving Day (2012 film), a Canadian feature film directed by Mike Clattenburg

== Television episodes ==
- "Moving Day" (The Goodies) or "The New Office"
- "Moving Day" (How I Met Your Mother)
- "Moving Day" (NYPD Blue)
- "Moving Day" (The Shield)
