= Moving =

Moving or Movin' may refer to:

== Moving of goods ==
- Relocation (personal), the process of leaving one dwelling and settling in another
- Relocation of professional sports teams
- Relocation (computing)
- Structure relocation

== Music ==
=== Albums ===
- Moving (Peter, Paul and Mary album), 1963
- Moving (The Raincoats album), 1983
- Movin' (Herman van Doorn album), 2001
- Movin' (Jennifer Rush album), 1985

=== Songs ===
- "Moving" (Kate Bush song), 1978
- "Moving" (Supergrass song), 1999
- "Moving" (Travis song), 2013
- "Moving", by Cathy Davey from Tales of Silversleeve, 2007
- "Moving", by Ed Sheeran from -, 2023
- "Moving", by Suede from Suede, 1993
- "Movin'" (Brass Construction song), 1976
- "Movin'" (Mohombi song), 2014
- "Movin'", by Moka Only from Magickal Weirdness, 2015
- "Movin'", by Skin from Fake Chemical State, 2006

== Other uses ==
- Moving (1988 film), a comedy starring Richard Pryor
- Moving (1993 film), a Japanese film
- Moving (British TV series), a British sitcom starring Penelope Keith
- Moving (South Korean TV series), a South Korean streaming television series
- Movin' (brand), a brand name used for radio stations

== See also ==
- Moving company, a type of company that will relocate household or other goods.
- Relocation service, relating to employees and company departments
- Move (disambiguation)
- Movin' On (disambiguation)
- Moving In (disambiguation)
- Moving on Up (disambiguation)
- Relocation (disambiguation)
