= Removal =

Removal may refer to:

- Removal (band)
- Removal jurisdiction in the United States courts
- Deportation, the legal removal by a government of a foreign citizen from its territory
- Removal of a child from its parents and placement in foster care by a child protection agency

Removal may also indirectly refer to:

- Administrative removal in immigration law
- Amputation, removal of a body extremity by trauma or surgery
- Deforestation (forest/tree removal)
- Enucleation of the Eye (eye removal)
- Hair removal
- Hedgerow removal
- Hidden-line removal, computer graphics
- Indian removal, the early 19th century United States domestic policy
- Manual placenta removal
- Removal services for moving house
- Removal of Internet Explorer
- Rib removal
- Penectomy (penis removal); see also emasculation
- Snow removal
- Stock removal
- Under cover removal
- Wire removal

== See also ==
- Relocation (disambiguation)
- Removable (disambiguation)
- Remove (disambiguation)
