= Moving On Up =

Moving On Up or Movin' On Up may refer to:

- "Moving On Up" (M People song), 1993, also covered by Belgian singer Roselle
- "Moving On Up (On the Right Side)", a 1996 song by Beverley Knight
- "Movin' On Up" (Primal Scream song), a 1991 song by Primal Scream from Screamadelica
- "Movin' On Up", a song by Azealia Banks, 2018
- "Movin' On Up", a 2000 episode of King of the Hill
- "Movin' On Up", the theme song of the television series The Jeffersons
- Movin' On Up, an album by Keith Frank

== See also ==
- Movin' On (disambiguation)
- Movin' Up (disambiguation)
- Moving (disambiguation)
- Moving In (disambiguation)
