= California New York Express Movers =

American moving and storage company

- Company type: Private
- Industry: Moving company
- Founded: 1995; 31 years ago
- Founder: Idan Mor
- Headquarters: Los Angeles, California, United States
- Area served: Los Angeles, San Francisco and New York City
- Website: www.moveeast.com

California New York Express Movers (CNYX) is an American moving and storage company that specializes in cross country/long distance moves. Based in Los Angeles, California, it provides moving services for long-distance moves.

It was founded by Idan Mor in 1995. The company is headquartered in Los Angeles, California, with offices and storage facilities in New York City and San Francisco. The company specializes solely in moving back and forth between Los Angeles, San Francisco, and New York City where they have additional storage facilities. They also provide moving services in New Jersey, Connecticut, and Pennsylvania.
