= Dumbo Moving and Storage =

American moving company

- Type: Privately held company
- Industry: Transport and Storage
- Founded: 2006; 20 years ago
- Founder: Lior Rachmany, Founder and CEO
- Headquarters: Brooklyn, New York, United States
- Number of employees: 185 (2016)
- Website: dumbomoving.com

Dumbo Moving and Storage, an American moving company based in Brooklyn, New York. The company made national headlines in 2016 for an advert that was deemed inappropriate to appear on subway cars.

== History ==
The company was founded in 2006.

In 2015, Fortune ranked Dumbo as one of the 100 Best Workplaces For Women. In April 2015, Dumbo announced a partnership with NYC Mammas Give Back, a New York non-profit that supports at-risk families.

Dumbo partnered with startup Crater in February 2016 to facilitate virtual price estimates. The new feature allowed customers to schedule a video call rather than an in-person appointment. The videos can be accessed by the moving crew as preparation before a move happens.

The company made national headlines in 2016 when one of its ads was deemed too inappropriate to appear on subway cars. The advertisement was rejected by the state-run Metropolitan Transportation Authority (MTA). Dumbo Moving submitted three ads to the MTA as part of its "protection-themed campaign" including the controversial partially nude couple touching amid moving boxes, a father in industrial goggles changing a diaper, and a man pleading for help from the Mafia. The company moved forward with the latter other two ads, but placed the controversial couple on the sides of their moving vans. In March 2016, members of the Orthodox Jewish community in Brooklyn painted over the ad on a company truck which had received criticism from the community for being "too risqué."
