= Movin' Up =

Movin' Up may refer to:

- Movin' Up (song), the debut single from Eurodance band Dreamworld
- Movin' Up (album), the debut album for the power pop trio The Elvis Brothers
- Movin' Up!, a 1977 album by organist Don Patterson

== See also ==
- Moving Up, an American reality television series that airs on The Learning Channel
- Moving On Up (disambiguation)
- Moving (disambiguation)
