= Lien =

Security on property or debt

A lien (/ˈliːn/ or /ˈliːən/) (Note: The pronunciation /ˈliːn/ is more common in US English.) is a form of security interest granted over an item of property to secure the payment of a debt or performance of some other obligation. The owner of the property, who grants the lien, is referred to as the lienee and the person who has the benefit of the lien is referred to as the lienor or lien holder.

The etymological root is Anglo-French lien or loyen, meaning "bond", "restraint", from the Latin ligamen, from ligare "to bind".

In the United States, the term lien generally refers to a wide range of encumbrances and would include other forms of mortgage or charge. In the US, a lien characteristically refers to nonpossessory security interests (see generally: Security interest § Types).

In other common-law countries, the term lien refers to a very specific type of security interest, being a passive right to retain (but not sell) property until the debt or other obligation is discharged. In contrast to the usage of the term in the US, in other countries it refers to a purely possessory form of security interest; indeed, when possession of the property is lost, the lien is released. However, common-law countries also recognize a slightly anomalous form of security interest called an "equitable lien", which arises in certain rare instances.

Despite their differences in terminology and application, there are some similarities between liens in the US and elsewhere in the common-law world.

== History ==
Outside the US, a common-law lien may be defined as a passive right to retain a chattel (and, sometimes, documentary intangibles and papers) conferred by law. Modern law has generally left the legal lien to cases where it has been historically established without any real effort to make it applicable to current conditions. In Tappenden v Artus [1964] 2 QB 185, Diplock LJ referred to a lien as a "self-help" remedy, like "other primitive remedies such as abatement of a nuisance, self-defence or ejection of trespassers to land". Equitable liens are an unusual species of property right, usually considered sui generis.

=== Common-law lien ===
Common-law liens are divided into special liens and general liens. A special lien, the more common kind, requires a close connection between the property and the service rendered. A special lien can only be exercised regarding fees relating to the instant transaction; the lienor cannot use the property held as security for past debts. A general lien affects all of the property of the lienee in the possession of the lienor and stands as security for all of the debts of the lienee to the lienor. A special lien can be extended to a general lien by contract, which is commonly done in the case of carriers. A common-law lien only gives a passive right to retain; there is no power of sale which arises at common law, although some statutes have also conferred an additional power of sale, and it is possible to confer a separate power of sale by contract.

The common-law liens are closely aligned to the so-called "common callings" but are not co-extensive with them.

A common-law lien is a very limited type of security interest. Apart from the fact that it only amounts to a passive right to retain, a lien cannot be transferred; it cannot be asserted by a third party to whom possession of the goods is given to perform the same services that the original party should have performed; and if the chattel is surrendered to the lienor, the lien entitlement is lost forever (except for where the parties agree that the lien shall survive a temporary re-possession by the lienor). A lienee who sells the chattel unlawfully may be liable for conversion and surrendering the lien.

=== Equitable lien ===
In common-law countries, equitable liens give rise to unique and complex issues. An equitable lien is a nonpossessory security right conferred by operation of law, which is similar in effect to an equitable charge. It differs from a charge in that it is nonconsensual. It is conferred only in very limited circumstances, the most common (and least ambiguous) concerning the sale of land; an unpaid vendor has an equitable lien over the land for the purchase price, notwithstanding that the purchaser has gone into occupation of the property. It is seen as a counterweight to the equitable rule, which confers a beneficial interest in the land on the purchaser once contracts are exchanged for purchase.

It is a matter of conjecture how far equitable liens extend outside the unpaid vendor's lien. Equitable liens have been held to exist in several cases involving choses in action, but not yet concerning chattels. The Australian courts have been the most receptive towards equitable liens concerning personal property (see Hewett v Court (1983) 57 ALJR 211), but a review of the cases still leaves a lack of clarity concerning the principles upon which an equitable lien will be imposed.

- In Re Stucley [1906] 1 Ch 67, a vendor of a reversionary interest in a trust fund sold the interest to the trustee and was held to have an equitable lien in the subject matter. However, it was personalty and not realty.
- In Barker v Cox (1876) 4 Ch D 464, the purchaser of property that was included in a marital settlement paid the price in advance to one of the trustees, and the purchaser was held to have an equitable lien in investments which the trustees subsequently acquired with the purchase price.
- In Langen and Wing v Bell [1972] Ch 685, a director's service agreement required him to assign his shares in the company if he was terminated, and he was to receive a price calculated at a later date when the annual accounts were available; he was held to have an equitable lien over the transferred shares to secure the payment of the eventual purchase price.
- In Lord Napier and Ettrick v Hunter [1993] 2 WLR 42, it was held that an indemnity insurer's subrogation rights concerning funds improperly paid directly to the insured were subject to an equitable lien.

But overall, there is still a lack of central nexus.

=== Statutory liens and contractual liens ===
Although arguably not liens as such, two other forms of encumbrance are sometimes referred to as liens.

==== Statutory liens ====
Certain statutes provide a passive right to retain property against its owner as security for obligations. For example, section 88 of the Civil Aviation Act 1982 of the United Kingdom permits an airport to detain aircraft for unpaid airport charges and aviation fuel. Although this right has been treated as a lien under UK insolvency law, it has been argued that such statutory rights are not in fact liens, but rights analogous to liens, although an argument may be made that this is a distinction without a difference.

==== Contractual liens ====
It has also been argued that an agreement by contract that one party may retain the goods of another party until paid is not a lien, as under the common law, liens could only be nonconsensual. However, under insolvency law, such rights will be treated as liens even if they are not expressed as liens.

== United States ==
Liens can be "consensual" or "nonconsensual" ("voluntary" or "involuntary" in different states). Consensual liens are imposed by a contract between the creditor and the debtor:

- Mortgage
- Chattel mortgage

Nonconsensual liens typically arise by statute or by the operation of the common law. Those laws give a creditor the right to impose a lien on an item of real property or a chattel by the existence of the relationship of creditor and debtor. Those liens include:

- tax liens, imposed to secure payment of a tax;
- "weed liens" and "demolition liens", assessed by the government to rectify a property from being a nuisance and public hazard;
- homeowner association (HOA) liens for unpaid assessments, fines, late charges, interest, costs, and attorney fees;
- attorney's liens, against funds and documents to secure payment of fees;
- mechanic's liens, which secure payment for work done on real property or land;
- judgment liens, imposed to secure payment of a judgment; and
- maritime liens, imposed on ships by admiralty law.

Liens are also "perfected" or "unperfected" (see Perfection (law)). Perfected liens are those for which a creditor has established a priority right in the encumbered property concerning third-party creditors. Perfection is generally accomplished by taking steps required by law to notify third-party creditors of the lien. The fact that an item of property is in the hands of the creditor usually constitutes perfection. Where the property remains in the hands of the debtor, a further step must be taken, like recording a notice of the security interest with the appropriate office.

Perfecting a lien is essential in protecting the secured creditor's interest in the property. A perfected lien is valid against bona fide purchasers of property and even against a trustee in bankruptcy; an unperfected lien may not be.

=== Equitable lien (U.S.) ===
In the United States, references to an "equitable lien" is a right, enforceable only in equity, to have a demand satisfied out of a particular fund or specific property without having possession of the fund or property. An equitable lien is a legal remedy rather than a security interest created to contemplate or support a transaction. In US law, such liens characteristically arise in four circumstances:

1. when an occupant of land, believing in good faith to be the owner of the land, makes improvements, repairs, or other expenditure that permanently increases the land's value;
2. when one of two or more joint owners makes expenditures of the kind described above;
3. when a tenant for life completes permanent and beneficial improvements to the estate begun earlier by the testator; and
4. when land or other property is transferred subject to the payment of debts, legacies, portions, or annuities to third persons.

=== Mover's lien ===
Movers are typically entitled to a mover's lien under UCC § 7-307/308 to withhold a customer's goods to secure payment. This is a possessory lien and is the nonconsensual type of lien (because it exists automatically under a statute instead of being affirmatively agreed upon). However, the concept of a mover's lien is often abused in a moving scam known as a hostage load, whereby the moving company will extort money not owed by the customer by refusing to deliver the goods unless the customer pays money inflated beyond the contractual estimate. Because the customer is interested in obtaining their goods, they are under duress to pay the ransom. Hostage loads in at least the interstate context are illegal under 49 USC 13905. The Federal Motor Carrier Safety Administration (FMCSA) regulates the moving industry and sometimes takes enforcement action by fining and delicensing offending moving companies. Moving companies that deliberately engage in hostage-loading may also be considered to be engaging in racketeering in violation of the Racketeer Influenced and Corrupt Organizations Act.

Disputes between legitimate lienholding of chattels versus hostage-loading can sometimes be averted by the customer, including an advanced (before-the-fact) consensual waiver of the mover's right to a lien in the written contract, obligating the moving company to deliver the goods with reasonable dispatch regardless of payment disputes. Failure to do so would constitute conversion or trespass to chattels.

== Maritime liens ==
A maritime lien is a lien on a vessel given to secure the claim of a creditor who provided maritime services or suffered an injury from the vessel's use. Maritime liens are sometimes referred to as tacit hypothecation. Maritime liens have little in common with other liens under the laws of most jurisdictions.

The maritime lien has been described as "one of the most striking peculiarities of Admiralty law". A maritime lien constitutes a security interest upon ships of a nature otherwise unknown to the common law or equity. It arises purely by operation of law. It is a claim upon the property, both secret and invisible, often given priority by statute over other forms of registered security interest. Although characteristics vary under the laws of different countries, it can be described as:

1. a privileged claim,
2. upon maritime property,
3. for service to it or damage done by it,
4. accruing from the moment that the claim attaches,
5. travelling with the property unconditionally,
6. enforced by an action in rem.

== Nomenclature ==
Throughout the world, there are many different types and sub-divisions of liens. Not all of the following liens exist in all legal systems that recognise the concept of a lien. The following are descriptions that are not necessarily mutually exclusive. Types of lien include:

- accountant's lien—the right of an accountant to retain a client's papers until the accountant's fees have been paid.
- agent's lien
- agister's lien—the lien of an agister over animals in the agister's care as security for fees.
- agricultural lien (United States)—a statutory lien that protects the seller of farming equipment by giving the seller a lien on crops grown with the equipment.
- architect's lien—the right of an architect to retain a client's papers until the architect's fees have been paid.
- attachment lien—a lien on property seized by pre-judgment attachment.
- attorney's lien—the right of an attorney to retain a client's papers until the attorney's fees have been paid (also referred to as a charging lien, solicitor's lien or a retaining lien in some jurisdictions).
- banker's lien—the right of a bank to satisfy a customer's matured debt by seizing the customer's money or property within the bank's possession.
- blanket lien—a lien that gives the lienor the entitlement to take possession of any or all of the lienee's real property to cover a delinquent loan.
- carrier's lien—a carrier's right to retain possession of cargo until the cargo owner pays shipping costs.
- choate lien (United States)—a lien in which the lienee, the property, and the monetary amount are established so that the lien is perfected and nothing else needs to be done to make the lien enforceable.
- common-law lien—a lien arising under the common law, rather than by statute, equity, or agreement between the parties.
- concurrent lien—means one of two or more liens over the same property.
- consummate lien (United States)—a judgment lien arising after the denial of a motion for a new trial.
- conventional lien (United States)—a lien created by agreement between the parties in circumstances where the law would not otherwise create a lien.
- deferred lien (United States)—a lien that only takes effect from a future date.
- demurrage lien—a carrier's lien on goods for any unpaid demurrage charges.
- dragnet lien (United States)—a lien that is enlarged to cover any additional credit extended to the debtor to the same creditor.
- environmental lien—a charge, security, or encumbrance on a property's title to secure payment of cost or debt arising from response actions, cleanup, or other remediation of hazardous substances or petroleum products.
- equitable lien—a lien that is enlarged to cover any additional credit extended to the debtor to the same creditor.
- execution lien—a lien on property seized by levy of execution.
- factor's lien—a lien, usually statutory, on property held on consignment by a factor.
- first lien—a lien that takes priority over all other encumbrances over the same property.
- floating lien (United States)—a lien that is expanded to cover any additional property that is acquired by the lienee while the debt is outstanding (in common-law countries, see Floating charge).
- garnishment lien—a lien on the debtor's property held by a garnishee.
- general lien—a possessory lien by which the lien holder may retain any of the debtor's goods in the lien holder's possession until any debt due from the debtor, whether in connection with the retained goods or otherwise, has been paid. Factors, insurance brokers, packers, stockbrokers, and banker's liens are all usually general liens.
- healthcare lien (United States)—a statutory lien asserted by an HMO, insurer, medical group, or independent practice association against those liable to the, also its patient in damages, to recover money paid or claim money payable for healthcare services provided (sometimes called a healthcare lien).
- hospital lien (United States)—a statutory lien asserted by a hospital to recover the costs of emergency and other ongoing medical and other services.
- hotelkeeper's lien—a possessory or statutory lien allowing an innkeeper to hold, as security for payment, personal property that a guest has brought into the hotel (also referred to as an innkeeper's lien).
- inchoate lien—a lien that may be defeated if the relevant judgment is vacated or a motion for a new trial is granted.
- involuntary lien—a lien arising without the lienee's consent.
- judgment lien—a lien imposed on a judgment debtor's non-exempt property.
- judicial lien—a lien obtained by judgment, levy, sequestration, or other legal or equitable process or proceeding.
- junior lien—a lien that is junior or subordinate to another lien on the same property.
- landlord's lien—a lien that empowers a landlord to seize a tenant's property and sell it to satisfy overdue rent.
- manufacturer's lien—a statutory lien that secures payment for labour or materials expended in producing goods for another.
- maritime lien—see above.
- mechanic's lien—also sometimes referred to as an artisan's lien, chattel lien, construction lien, labourer's lien, in various jurisdictions.
- mineral lien—a lien on working interest that secures payment for labor or materials expended by oilfield service companies.
- mortgage lien—a lien on the mortgagor's property securing the mortgage.
- municipal lien (United States)—a lien by a municipal corporation against a property owner for the owner's proportional share of a public improvement that specifically and individually benefits the owner.
- possessory lien—a lien allowing the creditor to keep possession of the encumbered property until the debt is satisfied.
- second lien—a lien that ranks next after a first lien on the same property.
- secret lien—a lien not appearing of record and unknown to the purchasers; a lien reserved by the vendor and kept hidden from third parties to secure the payment of goods after delivery.
- solicitor's lien—the right of a solicitor to recover his costs from a client. It is broader than a conventional lien.
- special lien—a possessory lien by which the possessor of goods has the right to retain specific goods until a debt incurrent in connection with the goods has been paid (also referred to as a particular lien). The opposite of a general lien.
- statutory lien—a lien arising solely by force of statute.
- tax lien—a lien on property and all rights to property imposed by the taxing authority for unpaid taxes.
- vendee's lien—a buyer's lien on the purchased land as security for repayment of purchase money paid in, enforceable if the seller cannot or does not convey good title.
- vendor's lien—a seller's lien on land as security for the purchase price (sometimes called an unpaid vendor's lien).
- voluntary lien—a lien created with the lienee's consent.
- warehouser's lien—a lien for storage charges for goods stored with a bailee (sometimes called a warehouseman's lien).
- workers' compensation lien—a statutory lien asserted by a healthcare provider to recover the cost of emergency and ongoing medical work, usually asserted against any compensation benefits paid to a patient.

== See also ==
- Bottomry
- Detinue
- Distraint
- False lien
- Mechanic's lien
- Mortgage
- Pawnbroker
- Replevin
- Repossession
- Security interest#Legal lien
- Tax lien
