= Remover =

Remover may refer to:

- Adhesive remover
- Staple remover
- Paint remover
- Nail polish remover
- Needle remover
- Lint remover

== See also ==
- The Removers, spy novel by Donald Hamilton first published in 1961
- Remove (disambiguation)
