= Remove =

Remove, removed or remover may refer to:

- Needle remover
- Polish remover
- Staple remover
- Remove (education)
- The degree of cousinship, i.e. "once removed" or "twice removed" - see Cousin chart
- Remove (C), function in the C programming language

== See also ==
- Deletion (disambiguation)
- Moving (disambiguation)
- Removable (disambiguation)
- Removal (disambiguation)
- Strip (disambiguation)
