= Fugain =

Album by Herman van Doorn

Studio album by Herman van Doorn
- Released: February 26, 2010
- Genre: French variety songs, ballads
- Label: Brigadoon / Flow Records
- Producer: Hermanherman

Fugain is the third album by Herman van Doorn. It is published under the alias Hermanherman.

This album was #68 in the Netherlands.

== Tracks ==
1. Bravo, monsieur le monde
2. Le printemps
3. Fais comme l'oiseau
4. Je n'aurai pas le temps
5. Comme un soleil
6. Chante
7. Attention, mesdames et messieurs
8. Forteresse
9. Ne m'oublie pas
10. Les rues de la grande ville
11. La fête
12. Dis-moi pourquoi
13. Une belle histoire
