= Removable =

Removable may refer to:

- Removable media, computing/electronic data storage
- Removable partial denture, dentistry
- Removable User Identity Module (R-UIM), telecommunication

In mathematical analysis

- Removable discontinuity
- Removable set
- Removable singularity

== See also ==
- Removal (disambiguation)
- Remove (disambiguation)
