= I'm Movin' On =

I'm Movin' On or I'm Moving On may refer to:

- "I'm Movin' On" (Rascal Flatts song)
- "I'm Moving On" (Hank Snow song)
- "I'm Moving On" (Scott Cain song)
- "I'm Moving On" (Yoko Ono song)
- "I'm Moving On", a song by B.B. King on his There Is Always One More Time album
- I'm Movin' On (Jimmy Smith album)
- I'm Movin' On (CeCe Peniston album)

== See also ==
- Movin' On (disambiguation)
