= The Story of Tracy Beaker series 5 =

The Story of Tracy Beaker
- Season 5
- Series Five Title Card
- Starring: Dani Harmer; Lisa Coleman; Connor Byrne; Montanna Thompson; Nisha Nayar; Ciaran Joyce; Ben Hanson; Darragh Mortell; Cara Readle; Jack Edwards; Abby Rakic-Platt; Jack Edwards; Nicola Reynolds; Deepal Parmar; Craig Roberts; Sophie Borja; Felix Drake; Georgina Hagen; Holly Gibbs; Olivia Grant
- No. of episodes: 20

Release
- Original network: CBBC
- Original release: 28 November – 9 December 2005

Series chronology
- ← Previous; Series 4 Next → Tracy Beaker Returns Series 1

The fifth and final series of the British children's television series The Story of Tracy Beaker began broadcasting on 28 November 2005 on CBBC and ended on 9 December 2005. The series follows the lives of the children living in the fictional children's care home of Elmtree House, nicknamed by them "The Dumping Ground". It consists of twenty, fifteen-minute episodes. It is the fifth series in The Story of Tracy Beaker franchise.

== Cast ==
=== Main ===
- Dani Harmer as Tracy Beaker
- Lisa Coleman as Cam Lawson
- Connor Byrne as Mike Milligan
- Montanna Thompson as Justine Littlewood
- Nisha Nayar as Elaine Boyak
- Ciaran Joyce as Lol Plakova
- Ben Hanson as Bouncer Plakova
- Darragh Mortell as Crash
- Cara Readle as Layla
- Jack Edwards as Marco Maloney
- Abby Rakic-Platt as Jackie Hopper
- Nicola Reynolds as Shelley Appelton
- Deepal Parmar as Chantal Wellard
- Craig Roberts as Rio Wellard
- Sophie Borja as Roxy Wellard
- Felix Drake as Wolfie
- Georgina Hagen as Rebecca Chalmers
- Holly Gibbs as Milly
- Olivia Grant as Alice

=== Guest ===
- Morgan Hopkins as Steve Littlewood
- Kathryn Dimery as Carrie
- Adam Skilton as John
- Morgan Wyn Bowen as Billy
- Vinod Soni as Chantal's dad
- George McAllister as Gary
- Ram John Holder as "Flying" Freddie Mercer
- Victoria Pugh as Mrs Ball
- Phylip Harries as Shop Assistant
- Emma Treharne Jones as Mrs Lucre
- Giles Thomas as Mr Lucre
- Patrick Robinson as Theo
- Lisa Diveney as Lucy
- Owen Garmon as Mr Willis
- Pamela Merrick as Mrs Hood
- Sid Beadle as Charlie
- Dave Bond as Mr Boxer
- Anita Reynolds as Mrs Boxer
- Natasha Collett as Emily
- Ruth Collett as Romily
- Maddie Rakic-Platt as New Girl
- Sian Naiomi as Registrar

== Casting ==
Georgina Hagen, Holly Gibbs and Olivia Grant were cast as Rebecca Chalmers, Milly and Alice respectively.

== Episodes ==
No. in series	Title	Original release date	Prod. code
1	"Caring and Sharing"	28 November 2005	5.1
To wean the kids off vegging out in front of the TV with a more classic pursuit... puppet theatres! Elsewhere, Mike is not enjoying his new role as chef. Return Justine Littlewod Debut Appearance Rebecca Chalmers
2	"Too Many Crooks"	28 November 2005	5.2
There is a mystery thief in the Dumping Ground, as seemingly random items are going missing – but who's responsible? Meanwhile, the feud between reluctant roomies Justine and Rebecca continues to rise. Lol feels torn between Bouncer and Wolfie now that Bouncer is not living at the DG, whilst Mike's cooking continues to cause a stir amongst the kids. Note- Guest appearance of Ben Hanson as Bouncer Platkova
3	"Chantal's Goodbye"	29 November 2005	5.3
The combined force of the Trio of Terror looks set to crumble, as Chantal decides to give her returning father another chance at being a responsible dad, much to the disgust of the other two. All the other kids are overjoyed though, as it may well mean no more Wellard tyranny. Meanwhile, Justine's father Steve pays a surprise visit after a bit of underhand activity on Elaine's part. But Justine remains distant. Final appearance Chantal Wellhard
4	"Free Piggy"	29 November 2005	5.4
Mike creates a mini-farmyard enclosure in the back garden, complete with three chickens and a fully-grown pig! Lol and Layla feel sorry for the pig, and embark on a liberation mission. Meanwhile, Rio is pulling out all the stops to maximise his chances of getting fostered at Elaine's Open Day, but all Roxy is interested in is maintaining the Wellard unity at any cost. And, A very special face for the DG's past makes a spectacular return on Open Day. Return Tracy Beaker Cam Lawson First appearance Gary Eyette
5	"Scary Milly"	30 November 2005	5.5
After the boys discover a creepy looking mask during a loft clear-out, everyone becomes convinced it has mystical powers, especially after strange goings-on start to happen. Is it really the mask – or maybe the Dumping Ground's latest arrival, who's perpetual silence is unsettling to say the least. Meanwhile, Justine is determined to prove to Rebecca that she can be sensitive by befriending a troubled Wolfie, which leads to an embarrassing misunderstanding. First appearance Milly
6	"Life Coach"	30 November 2005	5.6
Jackie limps back to the Dumping Ground on a crutch, but she's not in the mood for anything but solitude. Tracy's getting the impression she's not wanted by anyone, and Crash gets some news which makes him take to the punchbag in a big way. Meanwhile, Marco is having a crisis of costume. Return Jackie Hooper
7	"Frankelainestein"	1 December 2005	5.7
Elaine is not having a good day today a new girl called Alice arrives to the DG Marco wants a aline for Mother's Day and is told no until he brings his mum but the shop keeper finds out he's in a care home. - Guest Appearance of Ben Hanson as Bouncer Platkova First appearance Alice
8	"Tracy's Fantasy"	1 December 2005	5.8
After yet another row with Cam, Tracy, indignant that all the adults in her life are telling her to just grow up and think of others, decides to get them back with a prank-fest, which leads to an accident. A dream sequence follows, where Tracy's now Head Care Worker along with Roxy, all the adults are now children, the silent Milly is the gobbiest kid in the house, and Cam's dressed up and behaving like Tracy herself, and worse still, Justine and Crash are getting married. Will this strange dream soften Tracy's heart towards Cam and Gary?
9	"Cash Cows"	2 December 2005	5.9
It's 'Be Nice To Wolfie Day' in the Dumping Ground, as two groups of kids vie for his favour after finding out he's been receiving unwanted 'conscience cheques' from his parents totalling over £1,000 – but what good will come of it? Meanwhile, Lol and Bouncer become odd-job men around the house, but who's responsible for the place falling apart? Note- Guest Appearance of Ben Hanson as Bouncer Platkova
10	"Telling Tales"	2 December 2005	5.10
Tracy and Lol crack an egg on Elaine Rio throws his dump on Mike and Justine and Crash splash Shelly with water and are told to be in the quiet room for 6 hours. Return Shelly Appleton
11	"A Dog's Life"	5 December 2005	5.11
After Alice introduces Layla and Roxy to one of her 'wish-necklaces', strange things seem to start happening at the DG. Firstly, an abandoned dog turns up, then a wealthy couple with a view to fostering, and it's not long before the battlelines are drawn between the money-mad kids. Meanwhile, Tracy interviews Crash and Jackie about life in care for a newspaper article, and Roxy undergoes a complete makeover.
12	"Whodunnit?"	5 December 2005	5.12
When Elaine is targeted in a revenge attack, Shelly bans everyone from going out until they find out who done it until Alice announces it was her.
13	"Spare Dad"	6 December 2005	5.13
Crash's dad has an appointment to visit him at the Dumping Ground, but, with Justine and Jackie at loggerheads as to what's best for Crash, and Rio trying to muscle in on having a dad, Will father and son ever get the privacy they need to work out terms for starting again? Meanwhile, Justine, Jackie and Roxy fear they are becoming like Elaine as they interfere in Crash's life.
14	"Operation Careworker"	6 December 2005	5.14
When the DG kids find they'll have no say in who replaces Shelley as Head Care Worker, they decide to add their own interview stage to the three applicants up for the post. They begin to think they might have a winner, but nothing's as simple as that at Elm Tree House... Maybe the new Head Careworker lies much closer to home. Last appearance of Shelley Appleton
15	"Bouncer's Kitchen"	7 December 2005	5.15
When Mike ruins yet another meal and has to resort to takeaways once again, and finally resigns himself to the fact that Duke has gone for good, he decides to appoint Bouncer as new chef, which the kids are overjoyed at. But when Bouncer introduces a new macrobiotic regime with no sugars or additives at all, most of the kids are revolted – until very strange things start to occur... Note- Guest Appearance of Ben Hanson as Bouncer Platkova
16	"Love All"	7 December 2005	5.16
It's Valentine's Day, and Elaine and Mike have arranged a romantic disco party for all the kids, on the proviso that they all pair off for it – much to Roxy's disgust! With no love in the air, Marco and Milly spend the day playing Cupid in a series of ingenious ways, and one resident gets a comeuppance they'll never forget! Meanwhile, Justine and Rebecca are at loggerheads as they both want to be paired with Crash. Note- Guest Appearance of Ben Hanson as Bouncer Platkova
17	"Toddler In Town"	8 December 2005	5.17
Mike bangs his head after Marco and Milly scare him and Elaine has to take him to hospital with mild concussion, Justine is left in charge of the DG. But before she can fully start throwing her weight around, a surprise visitor arrives and turns the house upside down. Could this new arrival spell the end of her feud with Rebecca? Meanwhile, an old chest is found in the attic, and Lol, Roxy and Rio become fixated on finding out what's inside it.
18	"Two's A Crowd"	8 December 2005	5.18
There's a whole world of activity during Special Guest Day at the Dumping Ground – Justine had been looking forward to her dad Steve visiting, only to find he's brought the worst plus-one she could ever imagine, and Marco looks set to move in with the Boxers, but how will poor Milly take the news? Flying Freddie Mercer is subjected to a most demeaning prank and Bouncer finds his special treats have been doctored – It soon becomes clear that someone is trying to ruin the day. Note- Guest Appearance of Ben Hanson as Bouncer Platkova Last appearance Marco and Milly
19	"Moving On"	9 December 2005	5.19
Lol's heading to join his brother at the halfway house, and his leaving party prompts Tracy to consider her future – she hasn't long left to stay at the Dumping Ground herself, and even Alice can't see what's in store for her! After some pondering, she decides to give Cam one more chance, but how will she react to the surprise announcement Cam has for her?
20	"The Wedding"	9 December 2005	5.20
It's Cam and Gary's big day – but Tracy still doesn't want anything to do with it, and she won't tell anyone why. But when she changes her mind and crashes the wedding, Cam and her new husband drop a bombshell which changes everything! Meanwhile, it looks like Crash's artwork has finally attracted some professional interest, and it looks like the whole cycle is going to repeat itself with a new arrival at the Dumping Ground... Last apparance Tracy Beaker Justine Littlewood Mike Elaine Roxy and Rio Wellhard Lol and Bouncer Rebeca Layla Alice and Wolfie
