= The Story of Tracy Beaker series 4 =

The Story of Tracy Beaker
- Series 4
- Series Four Title Card
- Starring: Dani Harmer; Lisa Coleman; Nisha Nayar; Clive Rowe; Ciaran Joyce; Ben Hanson; Darragh Mortell; Cara Readle; Jack Edwards; Abby Rakic-Platt; Kristal Lau; Deepal Parmar; Craig Roberts; Sophie Borja; Vincenzo Pellegrino; Felix Drake
- No. of episodes: 22

Release
- Original network: CBBC; CBBC HD (repeats)
- Original release: 7 October 2004 – 5 April 2005

Series chronology
- ← Previous; Series 3 Next → Series 5

The fourth series of the British children's television series The Story of Tracy Beaker began broadcasting on 7 October 2004 on CBBC and ended on 5 April 2005. The series follows the lives of the children living in the fictional children's care home of Cliffside, nicknamed by them "The Dumping Ground". It consists of twenty-two, fifteen-minute episodes. It is the fourth series in The Story of Tracy Beaker franchise.

== Cast ==
=== Main ===
- Dani Harmer as Tracy Beaker
- Lisa Coleman as Cam Lawson
- Nisha Nayar as Elaine Boyak
- Clive Rowe as Duke Ellington
- Ciaran Joyce as Lol Plakova
- Ben Hanson as Bouncer Plakova
- Darragh Mortell as Crash
- Cara Readle as Layla
- Jack Edwards as Marco Maloney
- Abby Rakic-Platt as Jackie Hopper
- Kristal Lau as Hayley
- Deepal Parmar as Chantal Wellard
- Craig Roberts as Rio Wellard
- Sophie Borja as Roxy Wellard
- Vincenzo Pellegrino as Sid Rooney
- Felix Drake as Wolfie

=== Guest ===
- Seren Morgan as Amy
- Sarah Cartwright as Sue
- Marilyn Le Conte as Penelope Lawson
- Jane Murphy as Kez
- Rebecca Orchard as Maureen
- Evelyn Duah as Jane
- Katy Owen as Frances
- David Bond as Mr Boxer
- Anita Reynolds as Mrs Boxer
- Kieron Self as Mr Pincher
- Montanna Thompson as Justine Littlewood
- Rhian Green as Journalist
- Lloyd Johnson as Dignitary
- Howell Evans as Jack Hopper
- Tara Breathnach as Nurse Nadia
- Charles Lewsen as Arthur MacDonald
- Ram John Holder as "Flying" Freddie Mercer
- Noel Williams as George Divine
- Mike Haywood as Minister
- Richard Elfyn as Mr Smart
- Christine Winter as Constance
- George Heritage as Christopher "Crusher"
- Jody Lunnon as Sian
- Faith Kent as Dora
- George Atkins as Henry
- Amy Starling as Social Worker
- Julian Lewis Jones as Ron

== Casting ==
Welsh child actors Deepal Parmar, Craig Roberts and Sophie Borja were cast as siblings Chantal, Rio and Roxy Wellard respectively and Felix Drake took on the role of Wolfie. Vincenzo Pellegrino joined the show, playing head careworker Sid Rooney.

== Episodes ==
| No. in series | Title | Directed by | Written by | Original release date | Prod. code |
|---|---|---|---|---|---|
| 1 | "Return to Sender" | Delyth Thomas | Mary Morris | 7 October 2004 | 4.1 |
After the events of The Movie of Me, Tracy's now living with Cam, and just around the corner at the new location of the Dumping Ground (from Stowey House to Cliffside) is the arrival of the Wellards, every care workers worst nightmare, consisting of Rio, Chantal and their younger and superior sister Roxy. They guarantee it won't be a smooth start for both the kids and the staff. But Tracy Beaker's taken back to save the day! Note: First appearance of Roxy Wellard, Rio Wellard, Chantal Wellard and Sid Rooney.
| 2 | "Bouncer vs. Lol" | Delyth Thomas | Gary Lawson & John Phelps | 14 October 2004 | 4.2 |
It's Bouncer's birthday, but he is not telling Lol he's leaving, giving the Wellards a chance to create chaos by pitting the brothers against each other until Lol finds out Bouncer is leaving.
| 3 | "In With The Wellards" | Delyth Thomas | Simon Nicholson | 21 October 2004 | 4.3 |
Abandoning her plans to spend the day with Jackie, Tracy is forced to visit an Art Centre with Cam. Meanwhile, The Wellards plot to destroy all the kids files. But not before recruiting one of the other kids to do their dirty work.
| 4 | "Meet The Parent" | Delyth Thomas & Keith Washington | Emma Reeves | 28 October 2004 | 4.4 |
Cam's mother comes to stay, and she turns out not to be as bad as Tracy originally thought. Meanwhile, Duke and Bouncer set out to prove that they are good at everything that a stereotypical man is good at when Chantal claims that there are no real men at the DG.
| 5 | "Single White Female" | Delyth Thomas | Emma Kennedy | 4 November 2004 | 4.5 |
It's time for fun & games as the kids try to get what they want from new, inexperienced, careworker Kez.
| 6 | "Can't Buy Me Love" | Delyth Thomas & Keith Washington | Laura Summers | 11 November 2004 | 4.6 |
Tracy and Crash do Cam's food shopping, but they don't stick to the list Cam gave her and spend the money on what Tracy wants, such as fifty boxes of turkey nuggets, and various gadgets. Meanwhile, at the DG, Layla comes up with her own money-making scam – doing other residents' homework for them (charging fifty pence a sheet). But when Roxy grasses Layla up to Sid, the game's up.
| 7 | "Life Is a Cabaret" | Delyth Thomas | Laura Summers | 24 November 2004 | 4.7 |
Tracy and Cam have a massive fall out and Tracy has a nightmare that the dumping ground is a prison runed by Cam and her helpers Lol and Bouncer and Duke and Sid are chefs and Elaine is the fairy godmother.
| 8 | "Temper, Temper" | Delyth Thomas | Aileen Gonsalves | 8 December 2004 | 4.8 |
Tracy, Jackie and Crash have a masterplan as they take nasty pranks from the Wellards in unusual good cheer. But after a while of inordinate kindness and tolerance (especially from Jackie), Chantal becomes emotional, suggesting she hasn't seen much of this in her life so far. Meanwhile, Sid, in a badly conceived idea to compensate for the DG having only two members of permanent staff, decides to install a small number of surveillance cameras, which Lol and Bouncer take mischievous exception to.
| 9 | "Love and War" | Delyth Thomas & Keith Washington | Dan Anthony | 15 December 2004 | 4.9 |
Bouncer develops a crush on the trainee careworker Jane, but unfortunately, the Wellards overhear his plans to send her a letter. The Wellards make sure none of the letters reach the careworker, making letters of their own and sending them to Bouncer claiming to be Jane. Note: Tracy Beaker is absent in this episode.
| 10 | "Beam Me Up, Scottie" | Delyth Thomas | Tracy Brabin | 4 January 2005 | 4.10 |
Hayley has been fostered, and Layla is upset because Hayley never told her she would be leaving. Meanwhile, Elaine has been pulling out all the stops to find a perfect foster family for Marco, so the other kids plan to turn him into a "normal" boy. Note: Final appearance of Hayley.
| 11 | "Testing Times" | Jill Robertson | Sheila Hyde | 11 January 2005 | 4.11 |
When an Inspector comes to the DG, the Wellards plot to get the care home closed down by making it look as if Sid and Duke are mistreating the kids. But Tracy and the others have other ideas, plotting to show the Inspector how nasty the Wellards are.
| 12 | "Best of Enemies" | Jill Robertson | Othniel Smith | 18 January 2005 | 4.12 |
When Tracy is invited to a hotel function by Elaine, she is reunited with her old enemy, Justine Littlewood, and the pair soon realise they have been set up to portray Elaine as one of the best social workers. Meanwhile, Lol sets up a chat show when Chantal tries on Crash's parents' wedding ring without his permission and claims that it's hers. Note: Guest appearance of Justine Littlewood.
| 13 | "The Finishing Line" | Jill Robertson | Mary Morris | 25 January 2005 | 4.13 |
Tracy and Jackie have a sleepover until Jack passes away. Note: Final appearance of Jack Hopper. Note: First appearance of Freddy Mercer.
| 14 | "Dear Dad" | Jill Robertson | Roger Williams | 1 February 2005 | 4.14 |
After falling out with Crash over a game, Rio lies to the teasing Lol that his dad is in prison. When Crash hears this, the two of them become friends, due it sounding like they had something in common. Rio later feels guilty for this as he genuinely enjoys Crash's company, although Chantal and Roxy have no qualms about freaking Marco out about it. Marco also tries to help find Duke's mystery of the missing cake. Note: Tracy Beaker is absent in this episode.
| 15 | "Democracy" | Jill Robertson | Andy Walker | 8 February 2005 | 4.15 |
It's the battle of the sexes at the DG, as the rulebook is out the window and the house is turned into a warzone. Meanwhile, Duke considers leaving the DG for a job in an office, leaving Sid reeling.
| 16 | "The Snake" | Jill Robertson | Laura Summers | 15 February 2005 | 4.16 |
Rio's secret pet snake goes missing, but will he find it? Meanwhile, Lol and Bouncer try to restore Sid's sense of humour, not really to much avail and Marco goes missing. And has Rio's snake and tells Marco off and Duke told Rio his snake will be sick if he keeps it in a box. Note: Tracy Beaker is absent in this episode.
| 17 | "Rebel Without A Clue" | Jill Robertson | Emma Reeves | 22 February 2005 | 4.17 |
Sid decides to take some time off, and employs a new careworker. But not just any careworker, Constance Carlton, winner of the "Careworker of the year" award for the last five years. The gang are delighted to see the back of boring Sid, but soon learn they should be careful what you wish for, because you just might get it, and this time, there's no Tracy Beaker to save them, as she is banned from the house.
| 18 | "The Long Run" | Jill Robertson | Marianne Levy | 1 March 2005 | 4.18 |
Jackie receives an important letter for a Sports Academy, but will she take it? Meanwhile, after seeing Tracy flash the cash she was given by Cam's mother, the rest of the DG kids try to sweet-talk a couple from an old folks home into parting with their cash. But they make the mistake of underestimating the elderly.
| 19 | "Independence Day" | Jill Robertson | Mary Morris | 15 March 2005 | 4.19 |
Bouncer moves ever closer to the big shift from DG to Halfway House. But when Lol befriends new boy Wolfie and begins spending all his time with him, Bouncer wonders if he will be missed when he has left. Meanwhile, Marco and Layla are convinced Wolfie has eaten their pet. Note: First appearance of Shaun "Wolfie" Lynch (Felix Drake). Note: Tracy Beaker is absent in this episode.
| 20 | "Beaker Witch Project" | Jill Robertson | Laura Summers | 22 March 2005 | 4.20 |
Tracy and the Dumping ground go camping in the woods have Sausages and beans for dinner and go for a walk.
| 21 | "Roxy the Rock" | Jill Robertson | Mary Morris | 29 March 2005 | 4.21 |
Tracy and Roxy go head-to-head in a championship for the "Queen of the Dumping Ground" title, whilst a parcel from Chantal's father threatens to tear the Wellard trio apart. Meanwhile, Lol and Bouncer try to get into the Guinness Book Of World Records for 'Standing On Your Head In The Airing Cupboard All Day'. Until Chantal and Rio find out Roxy stole Chantal's letter from her dad.
| 22 | "We're Off The Map Now" | Jill Robertson | Gary Parker | 5 April 2005 | 4.22 |
The DG kids visit Carters Woods for Jackie and Bouncers last day, meeting Tracy and Cam along the way. But as they are led on a secret trail, it soon becomes clear that they have been set up by Sid and Duke, and Tracy and Cam receive a spectacular surprise. Note: Final appearances of Sid Rooney and Duke Ellington.

== Production ==
Jane Dauncey returned to her role as executive producer for her second and final series. Mia Jupp did not return as producer for this series, but did return in series 5. Instead, she was replaced by Jane Steventon. Filming began shortly after the end of the previous series, in 2004. Delyth Thomas returned for her third series, directing seven episodes alone and three episodes with Keith Washington, who joined the directing team (replacing Laurence Wilson). Replacing Joss Agnew and directing twelve episodes is Jill Robertson.

Mary Morris returned to her head writer position for a fourth series. Holly Lyons, Marvin Close, Ariane Sherine and Abigal Abben-Mensah did not return to write for series 4. They were replaced by Emma Reeves (who would later become head writer), Emma Kennedy, Aileen Gonsalves, Sheila Hyde, Roger Williams, Marianne Levy and writing duo - Gary Lawson & John Phelps. Returning from writing the previous three series are Morris, Laura Summers, Othniel Smith and Andy Walker. Returning from writing the previous two series are Gary Parker and Tracy Brabin while returning from writing series 3 are Simon Nicholson and Dan Anthony. Morris and Summers wrote four episodes each; Reeves wrote two episodes; and Nicholson, Kennedy, Gonsalves, Anthony, Brabin, Hyde, Smith, Williams, Walker, Levy, Parker and writing duo - Gary Lawson & John Phelps wrote one episodes each.

== Awards and nominations ==
| Ceremony | Award | Nominee | Result |
|---|---|---|---|
| 2005 Children's BAFTA Awards | Children's Drama | The Story of Tracy Beaker | Nominated |

== Ratings ==
| Episode no. | Total viewers | CBBC weekly ranking |
|---|---|---|
| 1 | 299,000 | —N/a |
| 2 | 216,000 | —N/a |
| 3 | 312,000 | 6 |
| 4 | 355,000 | 3 |
| 5 | 924,000 | 1 |
| 6 | 909,000 | 1 |
| 7 | 958,000 | 1 |
| 8 | 922,000 | 1 |
| 9 | 925,000 | 1 |
| 10 | 999,000 | 1 |
| 11 | 861,000 | 1 |
| 12 | 475,000 | 3 |
| 13 | 138,000 | —N/a |
| 14 | 723,000 | 1 |
| 15 | 993,000 | 1 |
| 16 | 108,000 | —N/a |
| 17 | 745,000 | 1 |
| 18 | 862,000 | 1 |
| 19 | 996,000 | 1 |
| 20 | 914,000 | 1 |
| 21 | 311,000 | 2 |
| 22 | 898,000 | 1 |
