= Moving In =

Moving In or Movin' In may refer to:

- Moving In (album), a 1996 Chris Potter recording
- Moving In, the European title for the 1984 film known as Firstborn in North America
- "Moving In", an episode of As Time Goes By
- "Moving In!", an episode of The Raccoons
- "Moving In", an episode of Rob & Big
- "Moving In", a former TV-show on MTV
- Movin' In, a 2010 comedy film
- Movin' In (album), a 1957 album by Specs Powell
- "Movin' In" (Diff'rent Strokes), a 1978 television episode
- "Movin' In (Principal Shepherd's Song)", a 2020 episode of Family Guy

== See also ==
- "Joey and the Moving In", an episode of Joey
- Moving (disambiguation)
- Movin' On (disambiguation)
