= Herman van Doorn =

Dutch singer

- Born: 1963 (age 62–63); Netherlands
- Occupations: Singer, voice actor
- Years active: 1999–present
- Website: www.hermanvandoorn.com

Herman van Doorn (born 1963) is a Dutch singer also known as "Hermanherman". He is known for singing the Dutch theme songs for the long running animated series Pokémon.

== Biography ==
Van Doorn studied at the Conservatory of Utrecht and Berklee College in Boston, with the emphasis to jazz vocals and improvisation. His styles widely range from improvised music and modern composed music, to pop and musical theatre. His most famous work is performing the Dutch theme songs for the television series Pokémon.

== Discography ==
Waar Is Toch Onze Sint?
Song Herman performed for a project with fans

=== Albums ===
- 1999: "For What You Are Is Never Seen"
- 2001: "Movin"
- 2010: "Fugain"
- 2017: "1418"

=== Singles ===
- 2010: "Le Printemps" (From the album: "Fugain")
- 2010: "Attention Mesdames Et Messieurs" (From the album: "Fugain")
- 2011: "Fête Foraine"
- 2014: "For The Fallen" (From the album: "1418")
