= Moving Day (Boston) =

Tradition in Boston, USA

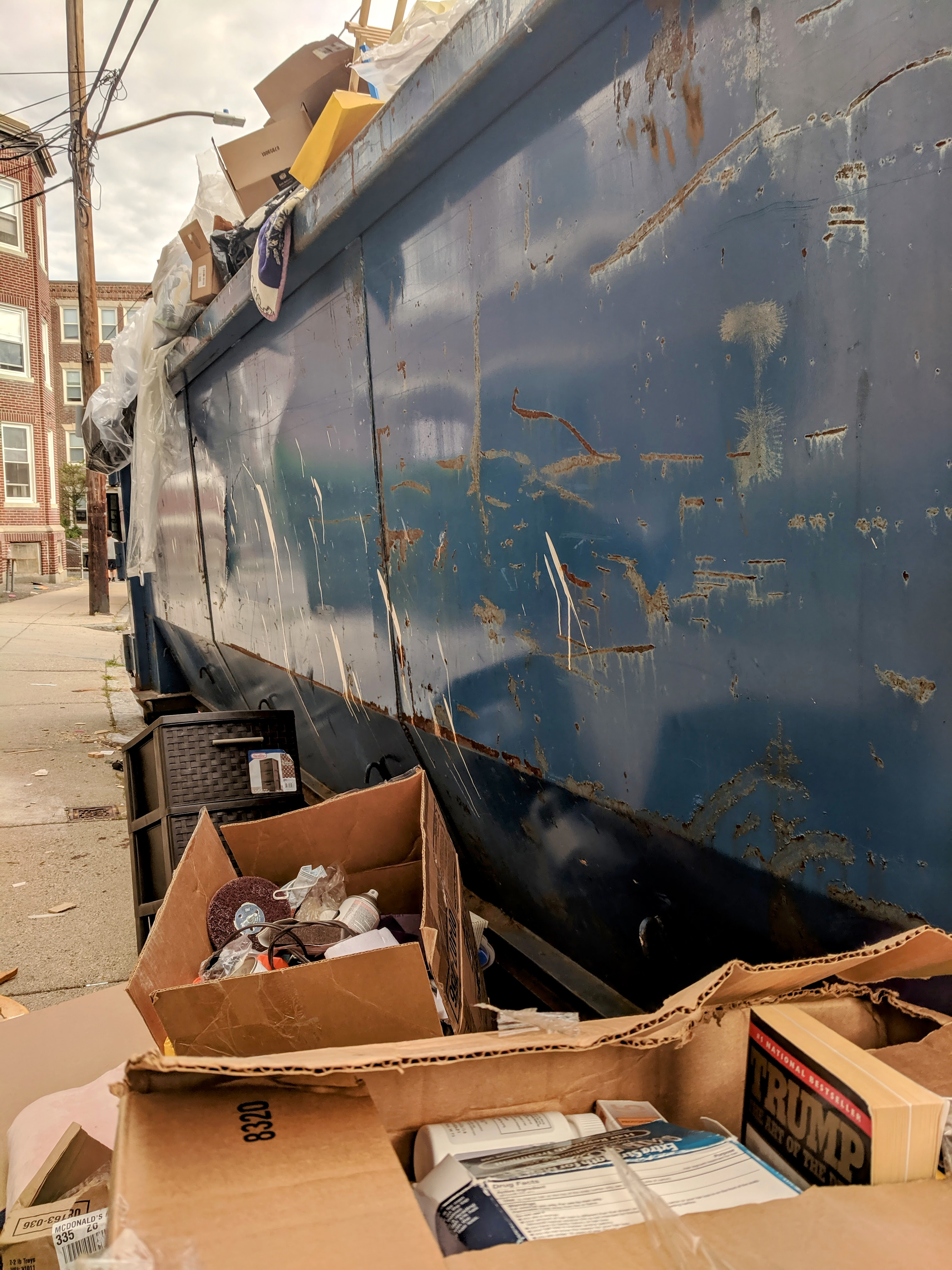
A dumpster overflowing with abandoned furnishings during Allston Christmas

Moving Day, known locally as Allston Christmas, is the traditional moving day in Boston, Massachusetts, that takes place annually on September 1. This day marks the beginning and end of many leases across the city, prompting thousands of residents—many of whom are college students—to move simultaneously.

== Description ==
September 1 is the traditional date that many Boston leases end, prompting thousands of residents to move house on the same day. Currently, approximately two-thirds to 70% of leases across the city end on this date. Many of the movers are college students or renters living in neighborhoods like Allston. Across the city, large amounts of unwanted furniture are left by the curbside. This has led to the phenomenon being known locally as Allston Christmas, as free belongings left behind are scavenged by other residents.

The September 1, 1925, edition of the Boston Globe describes the typical "mad scramble" and complications of Moving Day:

In many actual cases today one set of furniture waits on the lawn for the other to move out.... It is the old game, "going to Jerusalem," on a larger scale. This is the mad scramble from one location to another, every one trying to settle down in a preferred position, and discovering new neighbors in the process. As in the old game, also, every time there is a scramble some one gets left.... There are 15 families, all of which planned to move today, each one into a house formerly occupied by one of the others, and all 15 are held up because number one family is building a house for itself and can't move in until the plaster is dry. Number two family can't move until number one moves out, number three is waiting for number two, and so on.

== History ==
The earliest known reporting of a moving tradition on one specific day was in an 1899 edition of the Boston Globe, which described residents moving into back into Boston en masse from the countryside on September 1, at the end of summer vacation and to prepare for the coming school year and winter. Various articles in the same newspaper claimed that May 1 and April 1 had been previous moving days, but the practice had moved to the current date to accommodate families leaving for the summer so that properties would not sit vacant. In the late 1920s and 1930s, October 1 became the more popular date for moving day and became less well-observed, with families preferring not to move and others staying in the countryside later in the year. After World War II, the practice continued to fall out of popularity, as the city's rent controls expired and landlords set leases at various days throughout the year.

== Impact ==
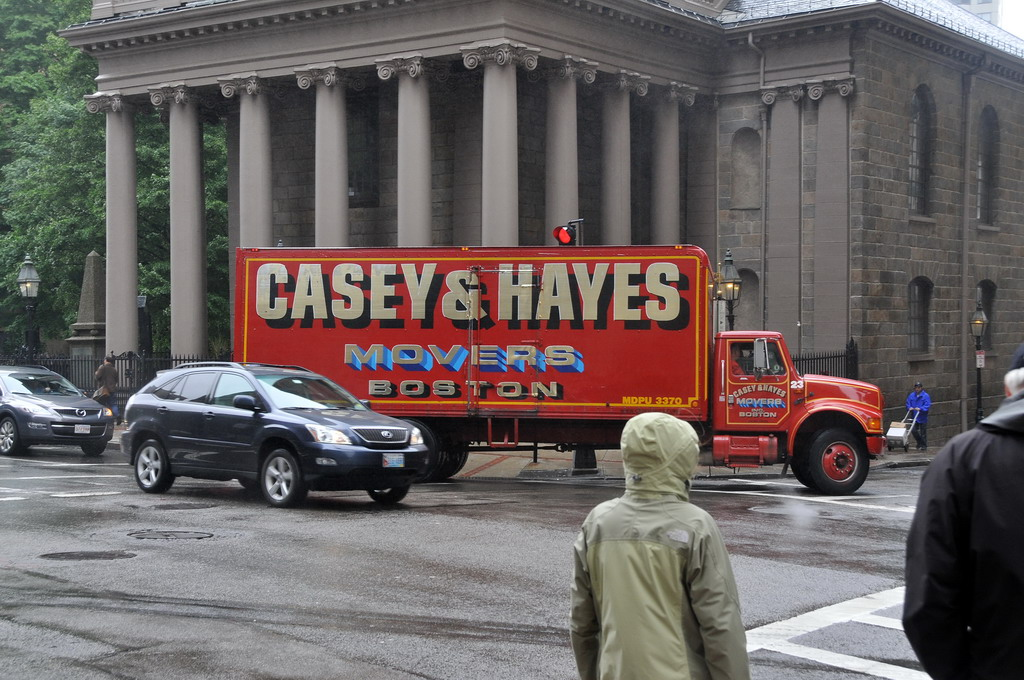
A moving van in Boston

Moving Day causes widespread traffic jams, diversions, and accidents across Boston. Many roads become congested or impassable due to high volumes of traffic, as well as obstacles left in the roadway.

Trash, debris, and unwanted belongings litter the streets in the aftermath of the moving day. In 2023, Moving Day produced 38 tons of waste and 1,700 abandoned mattresses.

More than half of Boston's moving permits are issued between June and August. During these months, an average of 16,000 to 20,000 permits are issued. South Boston and Back Bay account for more than a quarter of the annual number of permits.

The most heavily-impacted areas are those with high renter and student populations, such as Allston, Back Bay, Brighton, Fenway, South Boston, and South End.

To minimize impact, through traffic is diverted away from residential neighborhoods. The City of Boston requires movers to secure Street Occupancy Permits if they wish to reserve a parking space. People dumping furniture are ticketed if their abandoned furnishings cannot be recycled, and residents are now required to schedule a mattress pick-up rather than dumping it. The MBTA subway extends its operation times to allow movers using it more time to travel.

A frequent occurrence during Moving Day or in the days prior is when a moving truck gets "Storrowed" or wedged under a low clearance bridge on Storrow Drive, despite repeated warnings by local authorities.

== See also ==
- Moving Day (New York City)
- Moving Day (Quebec)
