= For What You Are Is Never Seen =

Studio album by Herman van Doorn
- Released: April 12, 1999
- Genre: Jazz
- Length: 57:00
- Label: Challenge Records

For What You Are Is Never Seen is the first album by Herman van Doorn.

== Tracks ==
1. My love is you
2. A timeless place
3. Something's coming
4. Clearly beloved, dearly beloved
5. Strangers in the night
6. Cancioneiro
7. Someone must know
8. Brother, where are you
9. The good life
10. I'm old fashioned
11. You and I
