= Relocation of professional sports teams in China =

Relocation of professional sports teams occurs when a team owner moves a team, generally from one metropolitan area to another, but occasionally between municipalities in the same conurbation.

Team moves in China are very common, as teams are privately owned or owned by businesses, and there are neither rules regarding moves nor many established fan bases outside of the handful of established top teams.

China, although has a European style promotion and relegation league system, the teams themselves are North American-style franchises which means the teams are overwhelmingly privately owned and therefore favour relocation practices. Owners who move a team generally do so seeking better profits, facilities, fan support, or a combination of these.

== Association football ==
- Bayi Football Team was a club under the sport branch of the People's Liberation Army, founded in 1927, one of the oldest clubs in the country. The club's reign as one of the most successful clubs in China would end with the advent of professionalism within the league. When the first fully professional league season started in 1994 the club were given special dispensation to remain as semi-professional as possible by having all their members remain active military members, however the club did start to take in sponsorship money to pay for the cost of running the club. At first little changed and the team even came third within the 1996 league season. Where the club really struggled was their ability to hold on to their contingent of Chinese international players such as Hao Haidong, Hu Yunfeng and Jiang Jin who started to leave the club for better offers. This saw the club struggle being unable to replace them through the transfer market and ultimately see them relegated to the second tier for the first time in the club's history. With less money coming in the club decided to disassociate themselves from their traditional Beijing home and took offers from other cities and sponsors to play for. They moved to Xinxiang and Liuzhou to accommodate their sponsors and while this worked for a brief period, which saw the club gain promotion back into the top tier the Chinese FA launched the rebranded Chinese Super League, which required more stringent conditions for the club to work in. Unfortunately this coincided with the loss in form of the team who were relegated at the end of the 2003 league season. The loss of prize money and stricter regulations ultimately forced Bayi to disband.
- Gansu Tianma was a football team based in Lanzhou, Gansu, who were relegated to the Yi League in 2004 and sold to Dongguan Dongcheng who moved the club to the Hong Kong First Division League. The club folded in 2009.
- Guangdong Sunray Cave played in the 8,000 seater Nanhai District Stadium in Foshan, Guangdong. The 2008 league campaign saw the team move into the 36,686 seater Century Lotus Stadium in Foshan. The club's debut season in the second division saw them move into the 12,000 capacity Huangpu Sports Center in Huangpu District, Guangzhou. The following season saw the owners wanting to move into the 15,000 capacity Guangdong Provincial People's Stadium, however it was going through renovation and the team had to use the Dongguan Stadium, Huangpu Sports Center and University of Technology Stadium before they finally moved in. In November 2014, a group of local companies from Shaanxi collectively acquired the full ownership of the club and subsequently renamed it to Shaanxi Wuzhou following the club's move to the Shaanxi Province Stadium in Xi'an.
- Hohhot Binhai moved after a year of existence in 2007 from Hohhot People's Stadium, Hohhot to the Hedong Sports Centre, Tianjin, becoming Tianjin Songjiang, although they have since moved across town to the 60 000 seater Tianjin Olympic Center Stadium and then again to a 22 370 capacity newly built Tianjin Tuanbo Football Stadium.
- Hubei China-Kyle moved from Hubei to Xinjiang's capital city Ürümqi and changed their name to Xinjiang Tianshan Leopard in February 2014.
- Jining Dranix, founded in 1999, was then based in Jining, Shandong. They stayed there until 2004, when in 2005, they moved to Ningbo, Zhejiang and were renamed Ningbo Zhongbao Cixi. There, they played at Ningbo Cixi Stadium. They didn't compete in the 2007 season and moved to Shenyang for the following 2008 season, becoming Shenyang Dongjin In February 2012, Shenyang Dongjin announced they would shift their home stadium to Hohhot for 2012 and 2013 league season. The full name of the club would change as Shenyang Dongjin Football Club Hohhot Dongjin Team (Hohhot Dongjin for short). The club finished in the bottom of the league and was relegated to China League Two.
- Kunming Ruilong was established at Yunnan's capital city Kunming on March 20, 2012. The club moved their home stadium to Dali, another city in Yunnan, adding "Dali" to their name on March 22, 2013.
- Qianwei Huandao, originally based in Wuhan, upon reaching the top tier its owners decided that the club needed to affiliate itself with a major reign and would decide to move nearby to Chongqing and into the Datianwan Stadium, renaming the club in 2000 accordingly to Chongqing Longxin.
- Shaanxi National Power moved from Jiaodaruisun Stadium, Shaanxi to Ningbo in 2004 and to Harbin a year later, before folding in 2005.
- Shanghai Hengyuan moved from Shanghai to Nanchang a year after its creation in 2004, becoming Nanchang Hengyuan. After disappointing attendances the club left the Nanchang Bayi Stadium and returned to Shanghai to play at the Jinshan Football Stadium in 2013, although they currently play at the Yuanshen Sports Centre Stadium. The club is currently known as Shanghai Shenxin.
- Shanghai Pudong, became a professional team in 1995, representing the Pudong district of Shanghai. After facing competition from more popular clubs in the city, they moved to Xi'an, Shaanxi in 2006 and renamed as Shaanxi Baorong Chanba in 2007. In 2012, the club moved again to Guiyang, Guizhou, where they established themselves at the Guiyang Olympic Centre under the name Guizhou Renhe.
- Shanghai Stars founded in 2003, in Shanghai, most commonly associated with the name Shanghai Pudong Zobon F.C., before the start of the 2008 league season moved to the 30,000 seater Wuxi Sports Center, in Wuxi, a city in the nearby Jiangsu and the club was renamed as Wuxi Zobon. However the move to a new city was not successful either on the field or off it and after only one year within Wuxi the club returned to Shanghai again in the 2009 league season. The club would be renamed Pudong Zobon as well as moving into the 16,000 seater Pudong Yuanshen Sports Centre, in the Pudong area of Shanghai. he club was dissolved at the end of the 2012 season.
- Shanghai United was founded as Dalian Sidelong, in Dalian. In 2003, the club was moved to Zhuhai, Guangdong, becoming Zhuhai Anping. In 2004, the club was moved to Yuanshen Sports Centre Stadium, Shanghai and became Shanghai United. The club ceased to exist when it was merged with (de facto absorbed into) city rival Shanghai Shenhua in 2007.
- Shanxi Jiayi was established on October 8, 2011. In January 2014, the club changed its name to Taiyuan Zhongyou Jiayi, and on January 14, 2015, moved to the city of Hohhot and changed their name to Nei Mongol Zhongyou
- Shenyang Ginde was founded in 1986 in Shenyang, where they played in the 55,000-seater Shenyang Wuilihe Stadium, until they moved to Changsha in 2007 to reside in the Helong Stadium. When American sportswear and sports equipment company MAZAMBA took over the club in 2010 they moved the club to Shenzhen in February 2011; however, their ownership was brief, and by June 2011 Chinese property developers Guangzhou R&F gained ownership of the club and moved them to Guangzhou, Guangdong. Their home stadium is the Yuexiushan Stadium that has a seating capacity of 18,000, adopting the same name as their new owners Guangzhou R&F, although the R&F is officially short for "Rich" (富) and "Force" (力).
- Shenzhen Kinspar, founded in 1996, moved after a year from Shenzhen to Kunming to play in the Tuodong Stadium and was renamed Yunnan Hongta. It ceased to exist after a merger with Chongqing Lifan in 2003.
- Tianjin Runyulong, founded in August 2009, was originally planned take over the licence of Anhui Jiufang and be based at the 18,000-seat Minyuan Stadium in Tianjin, but the club quickly find out that the full acquisition of Anhui Jiufang as well as the running cost of the club would cost them 540 million yuan, more than the club expected and that they would need to quickly find investment if they were to pay their players on time. The investment would come from the local Shenbei government who wanted them to move into the 30,000-seat Tiexi Stadium in Shenyang. The club was officially dissolved on February 27, 2015.
- Beijing Zangying Xuequan, later Xizang Huitong Luhua, played in the Yi League until 2005, when they purchased Dalian Changbo from the upper Jia League in 2006. The newly merged team was moved to Taiyuan, Shanxi and renamed to Shanxi Wosen Luhu, taking Dalian Changbo's place in the Second Division ever since. It moved to Hohhot People's Stadium, Hohhot in 2007, becoming Hohhot Black Horse, but folded later that same year.
- Fujian Smart Hero was founded in 2011. Hebei Ever Bright Real Estate Development Co., Ltd. bought 70% shares of the club in December 2012. The club moved to Hebei's capital city Shijiazhuang and changed its name into Shijiazhuang Yongchang Junhao. The club is currently known as Shijiazhuang Ever Bright.
- Yiteng F.C., was founded as an amateur club in 1988 under the name Dalian Tielu. Upon becoming professional in 1995, the name was changed to Dalian Yiteng, and the club has since kept the "Yiteng" name, alternating names between Dalian Yiteng, Harbin Yiteng and Yantai Yiteng throughout its history. In 2005, the club moved from Dalian to the 30,000 seater Hagongda Stadium, Harbin, becoming Harbin Yiteng. A move to Yantai in Shandong in March 2008 and playing in the 45,000 seater Yantai Sports Park Stadium as well as a new all blue kit from the previous all red, hoped to revitalize the team, however none of these worked as they were relegated at the end of the 2008 league season. A move back to Dalian followed in 2009, however it wasn't until April 1, 2011, when they returned to Harbin, to the Harbin Sports City Center Stadium did their fortunes changed and they won their first piece of silverware, the 2011 China League Two division and promotion back into the second division.

== Baseball ==
- Beijing Tigers played at the 5,000-capacity Beijing Fengtai Baseball Field until 2006, when the stadium was destroyed and rebuilt as the Fengtai Softball Field. Their stadium for the 2006 season was relocated to Lucheng, a rural area to the south of Beijing.

== Basketball ==
- Bayi Rockets, founded in 1955 in Ningbo, Zhejiang, in 2018 moved to Nanchang, Jiangxi.
- Dongguan New Century Leopards was founded in Dongguan, Guangdong, in 2003 and played its first 12 seasons in that city before moving to nearby Shenzhen in 2015 becoming Shenzhen New Century Leopards.
- Guangzhou Free Man was founded in 2009 in Guangzhou. The team moved to Chongqing in 2012 becoming Chongqing Fly Dragons. In September 2015, the club moved again to Beijing and was initially renamed Beikong Fly Dragons
- Henan Dragons, founded in 2004 moved from their original home city of Zhengzhou to Jiyuan in the middle of their first season. From 2004 to 2006 they were known as the Henan Jigang Dragons or Henan Dragons or Henan Jigang, based in Luoyang, and Jiyuan, Henan. For the CBA 2006–07 season, the team was moved to Taiyuan, and is now known as Shanxi Zhongyu. The team has fared little better since moving to Shanxi.
- Shaanxi Kylins in 2010 moved from Xi'an, Shaanxi to Foshan, Guangdong and renamed themselves Foshan Dralions.
