= Car relocation =

Rental cars needing return to original branch

In the sharing economy, transfer cars, relocation cars, or driveaways are rental cars that need to be transferred back to their original branch after a one-way rental. Rental car companies have traditionally used truck and train transporters to re-position their fleet until this model was disrupted by websites which let travelers book those transfer cars for free or for a very small amount of money.
