= Moving Day (Quebec) =

Traditional beginning and end of leases in Quebec, Canada

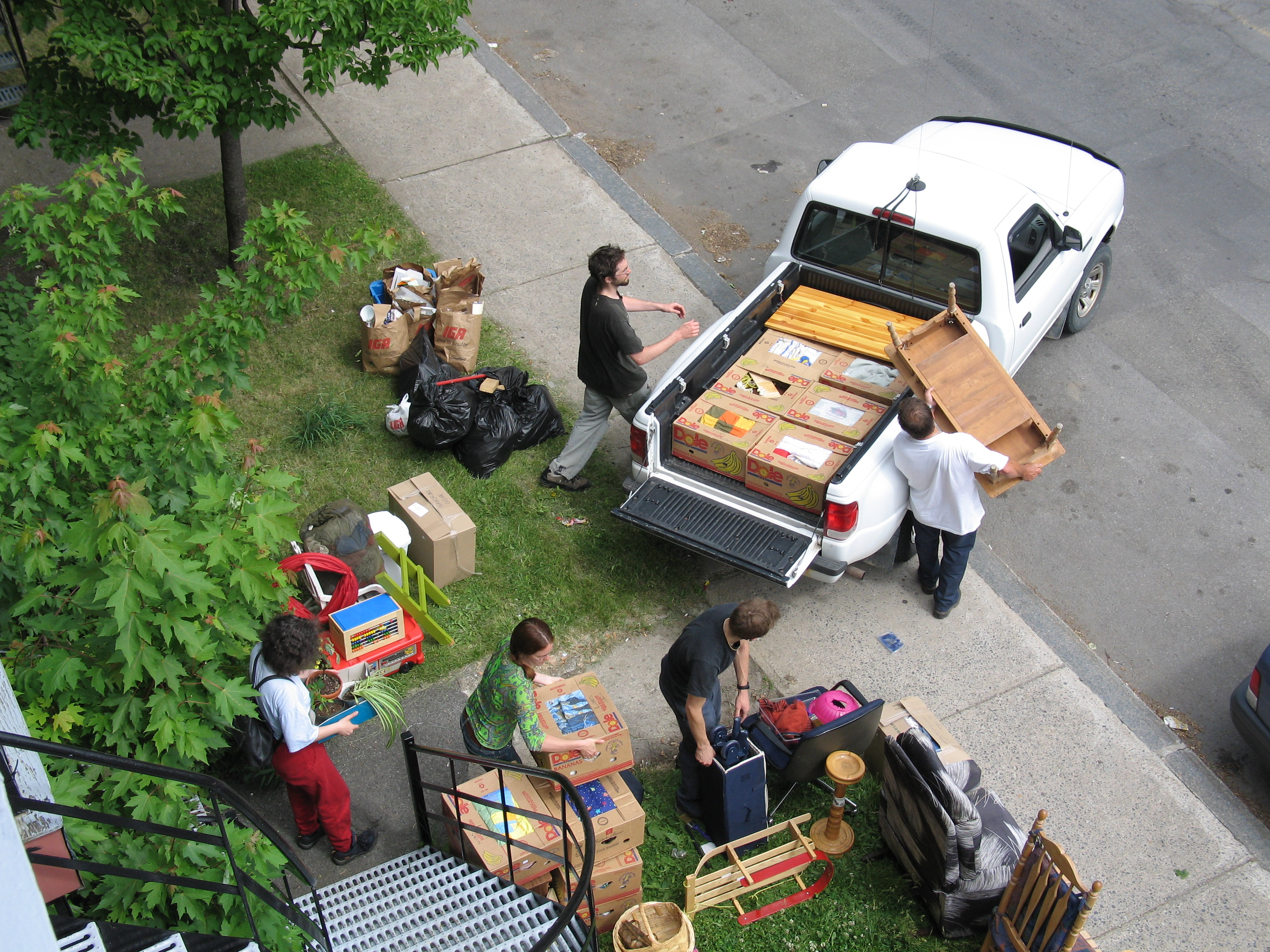
Typical scene of people moving in the Quebec City borough of Limoilou, on July 1, 2007.

Moving Day (French: jour du déménagement) is a tradition, but not a legal requirement, in the province of Quebec, Canada, dating from the time when the province used to mandate fixed terms for leases of rental properties. It falls on July 1, which is also Canada Day.

== History ==
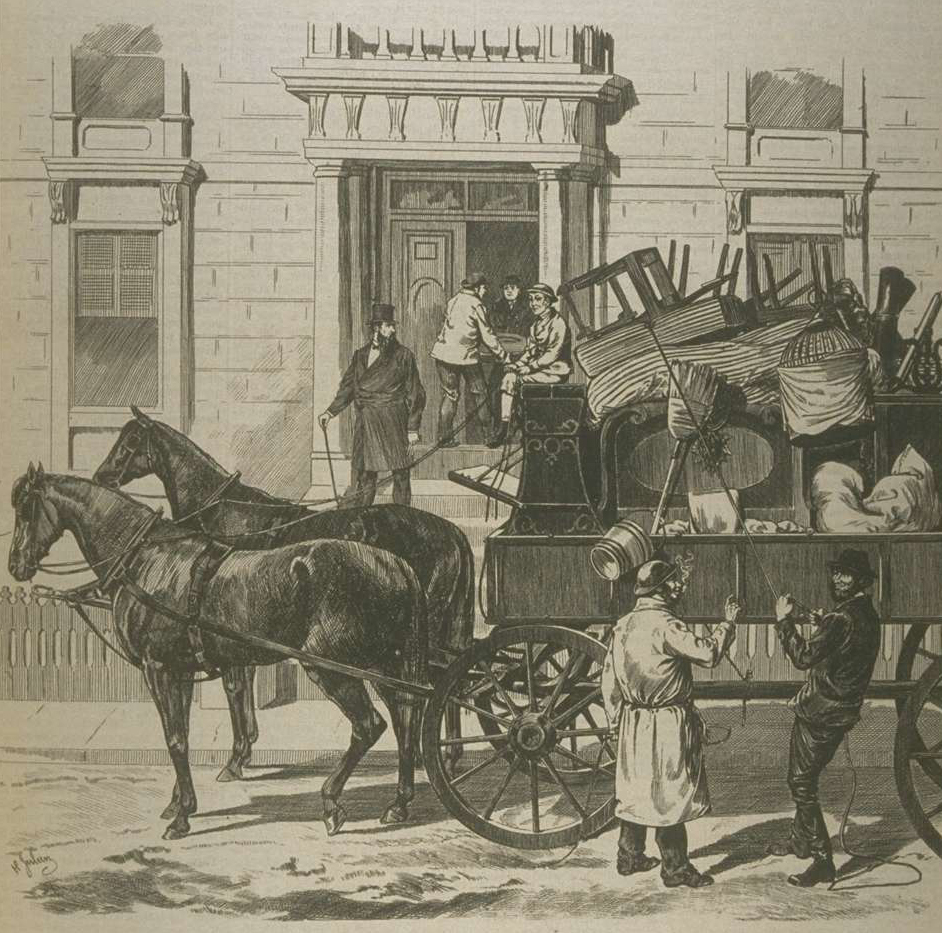
Moving Day in Montreal, as depicted by Henri Julien, 1876

The tradition began as a humanitarian measure of the French colonial government of New France, who forbade seigneurs, the semi-feudal landlords of the seigneuries, from evicting their tenant farmers before the winter snows had melted. Historian Yvon Desloges notes that it was common to move in the spring in the 18th century, citing a 1750 bylaw by Intendant François Bigot. Additionally, Jean-Philippe Warren, a sociologist at Concordia University in Montreal, noted in a 2013 interview for The New York Times that French law in the 18th century set May 1 as the starting date for all legal agreements, including leases.

Later, this evolved into a requirement that urban leases begin on May 1 and end on April 30. In law, this date was set in the Civil Code of Lower Canada of 1866. May 1 thus became "Moving Day", the day during which renters who wished to vacate their current premises physically changed domiciles.

In 1973, the Quebec government decided that it would be better to move Moving Day to the summer. This measure would allow children, especially the ones in primary school to complete their full year at the same establishment. Also, by moving the date to a holiday, workers would not have to sacrifice a working day. They moved the date from May 1st to July 1 because of the tendency for rough weather in early May. The law repealed sections of the civil code setting fixed terms for leases as of 1974, but mandated a two-month lengthening of leases for the following year as a transitional measure. However, tradition has held sway, and the vast majority of leases are still a year long and begin around July 1. In 2004, approximately 120,000 households moved on or around July 1, corresponding to 4% of the population. In 2013, the government of Montreal estimated that about 115,000 city residents moved each year, or about 7% of the city's 1.6 million people.

== Impact ==
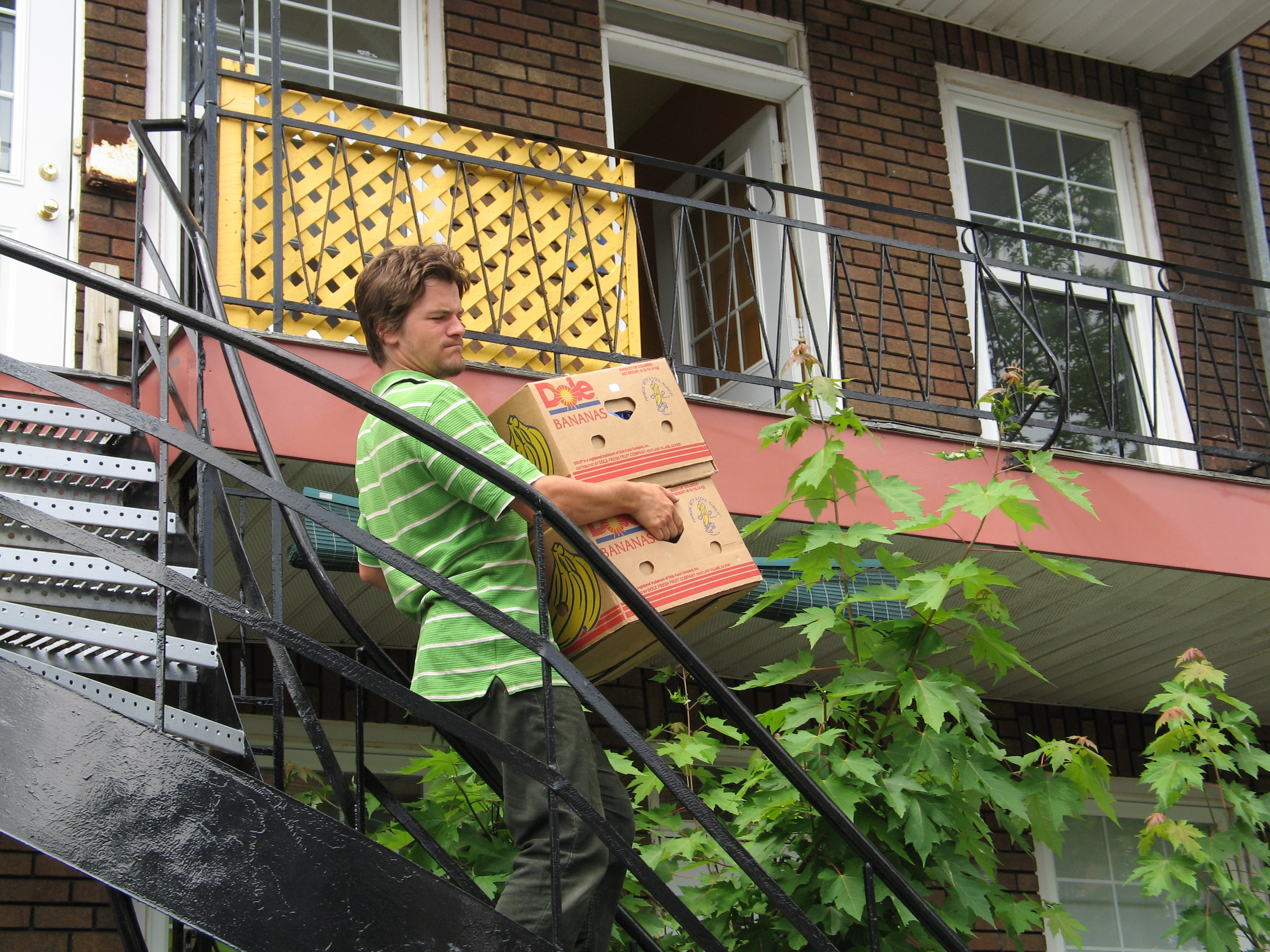
Typical scene of people moving in the Quebec City borough of Limoilou, on July 1, 2007.

Moving Day is a boon and a headache for commercial moving companies, and people must reserve their services in advance, more than six months before moving day in some cases. During this period, moving companies work around the clock, with moving charges often being three times the normal rate. The short supply of movers in Montreal inspired entrepreneurs to offer a green moving service featuring heavy-duty bicycle trailers.

In Montreal, where as of 2019 only 55.7% of residents own their home (the lowest rate of the major Canadian cities), Moving Day is particularly busy and has been described as "a kind of moving madness". Exterior staircases leading up to second, third, or even fourth-storey apartments are common in many neighbourhoods, in part because historical municipal rules required building setbacks, making outdoor staircases more cost effective by saving indoor space and the need to heat those shared spaces. These staircases are often narrow, curved, and metal – not ideal for nonprofessionals carrying major appliances. According to New York Times writer Ian Austen, "unlike apartments in the rest of Canada, the ones here [in Montreal] rarely come with kitchen appliances, adding to the movers' burdens." Cities also schedule extra garbage and recycling pickups for this period to deal with unwanted furniture and empty boxes left beside the road. According to Hydro-Québec, more than 700,000 Quebec households moved in 2009, including 225,000 on the island of Montreal.

The July 1 date of Moving Day also somewhat reduces the significance of Canada Day as a public holiday in Quebec, as many who might otherwise attend holiday festivities are occupied by moving. Suggestions that the move was a deliberate decision by Quebec sovereigntists to discourage participation in a patriotic Canadian holiday ignore the fact that the change in date from May 1 to July 1 was the result of a bill introduced by a federalist MNA, Jérôme Choquette of the Quebec Liberal Party.

Although moving day is seen as a headache for most people, Montreal-based columnist Josée Legault sees a few positive aspects in the annual festival, pointing out that July 1 occurs at the end of the school year, not two months before as was the case before the 1970s. Bargain hunters – especially people who don't move – also enjoy the numerous garage sales occurring before moving day and the common practice of leaving behind slightly used furniture and appliances on the curb side or in the alley, in effect giving them to anyone in need.

The annual ritual has also been translated in Quebec's literature, music and cinema. Gabrielle Roy's classic novel Bonheur d'occasion describes the traditional frenzy surrounding Moving Day in the working-class borough of Saint-Henri in Montreal.

Quebec film director Philippe Gagnon used the yearly occurrence as the setting for Premier juillet, le film, a 2004 light-hearted comedy featuring three households caught in the turmoil of Moving Day.

== See also ==
- Moving (address)
- Moving Day (Boston)
- Moving Day (New York City)
