= Movin' (Herman van Doorn album) =

Studio album by Herman van Doorn
- Released: January 9, 2001
- Genre: Jazz
- Length: 1:02:30
- Label: Xing

Movin' is the second album by Herman van Doorn.

== Tracks ==
1. I am driven
2. The candle, a saint
3. Black and white blues
4. Listen here
5. The fool on the hill
6. Don't stop me now
7. Shamed into love
8. Movin' on
9. Sounds, consider me gone
10. Invitation
11. Again
12. Whistling away the dark
13. Nature boy
