= Movin' On =

Movin' On or Moving On may refer to:

== Film and television ==
- Moving On (1974 film), an Australian film
- Moving On (2019 film), a Korean film
- Moving On (2022 film), an American dark comedy
- Movin' On (TV series), a 1974–1976 American drama series
- Moving On (TV series), a 2009–present British anthology series
- Hollyoaks: Movin' On, a spin-off of the UK soap opera Hollyoaks

=== Television episodes ===
- "Moving On" (Abby), 2003
- "Moving On" (Doctors), 2004
- "Moving On" (George and Mildred), 1976
- "Moving On" (Holby City), 2000
- "Moving On" (House), 2011
- "Moving On" (The Office), 2013
- "Moving On" (Tracy Beaker Returns), 2010

== Music ==
=== Albums ===
- Moving On (911 album) or the title song, 1998
- Movin' On (Commodores album), 1975
- Movin' On (The Greencards album), 2003
- Moving On (Oleta Adams album), 1995
- Movin' On (Playa Fly album) or the title song, 1998
- Movin' On (Reuben Wilson album) or the title song, 2006
- Moving On (Sarah Dawn Finer album) or the title song (see below), 2009
- Movin' On, by Buddy Greco, 1973
- Moving On, by Jacky Terrasson, 2024
- Moving On, by John Mayall, 1972
- Moving On, by Myleene Klass, 2003
- Movin' On, by Oscar Brown, 1972
- Moving On, by Ozomatli, 2020
- Movin' On, by Ralph Bowen, 1992
- Moving On, by the San Francisco Boys Chorus, 2003
- Moving On, by Unter Null, 2010
- Movin' On, by Vicki Sue Robinson, 1979

=== Songs ===
- "Moving On" (Asking Alexandria song), 2014
- "Movin' On" (Bad Company song), 1974
- "Movin' On" (Bananarama song), 1992
- "Movin' On" (CeCe Peniston song), 1996
- "Movin' On" (Elliott Yamin song), 2007
- "Moving On" (Marshmello song), 2017
- "Movin' On" (Merle Haggard song), the theme song from the TV series, 1975
- "Movin' On" (Mya song), 1998
- "Movin' On" (The Rankins song), 1998
- "Moving On" (Sarah Dawn Finer song), 2009
- "Moving On" (Taio Cruz song), 2007
- "Moving On" (Zhang Liyin song), 2009
- "Moving On", by Adonxs from Age of Adonxs, 2022
- "Moving On", by Bleach from Astronomy, 2003
- "Movin' On", by Blur from Blur, 1997
- "Movin' On", by the Boomtang Boys, 2002
- "Movin' On", by Crystal Bowersox from All That for This, 2013
- "Movin' On", by Dream, 2000
- "Moving On", by Gary Moore from Still Got the Blues, 1990
- "Movin' On", by Good Charlotte from The Young and the Hopeless, 2002
- "Moving On", by Good Charlotte from Youth Authority, 2016
- "Movin' On", by Gotthard from G., 1996
- "Movin' On", by Ian Van Dahl, 2005
- "Moving On", by James from La Petite Mort, 2014
- "Movin' On", by Joe Satriani from Super Colossal, 2006
- "Moving On", by Kimya Dawson from Hidden Vagenda, 2004
- "Moving On", by King Diamond from Give Me Your Soul...Please, 2007
- "Moving On", by Leonard Cohen from Thanks for the Dance, 2020
- "Movin' On", by Masta Ace from Take a Look Around, 1990
- "Movin' On", by Missouri from Missouri, 1977
- "Movin' On", by Musiq Soulchild from Luvanmusiq, 2007
- "Moving On", by Nmixx from Fe3O4: Stick Out, 2024
- "Movin' On", by Paul Weller from True Meanings, 2018
- "Moving On", by Rod Wave from SoulFly, 2021
- "Moving On", by Ryuichi Sakamoto from Sweet Revenge, 1994
- "Movin' On", by Sandaime J Soul Brothers, 2020
- "Moving On", by Sixpence None the Richer from Sixpence None the Richer, 1997
- "Movin' On", by Status Quo from Quid Pro Quo, 2011
- "Moving On", by Toya from Toya, 2001

== See also ==
- I'm Movin' On (disambiguation)
- Moving On Up (disambiguation)
