= Relocated =

Relocated may refer to:

- Relocated (album), 2006 album by Camouflage
- Red vs. Blue: Relocated, 2009 television miniseries
- "The Relocated", Inuit of the High Arctic relocation
