= Moving Day (New York City) =

Former tradition in New York City

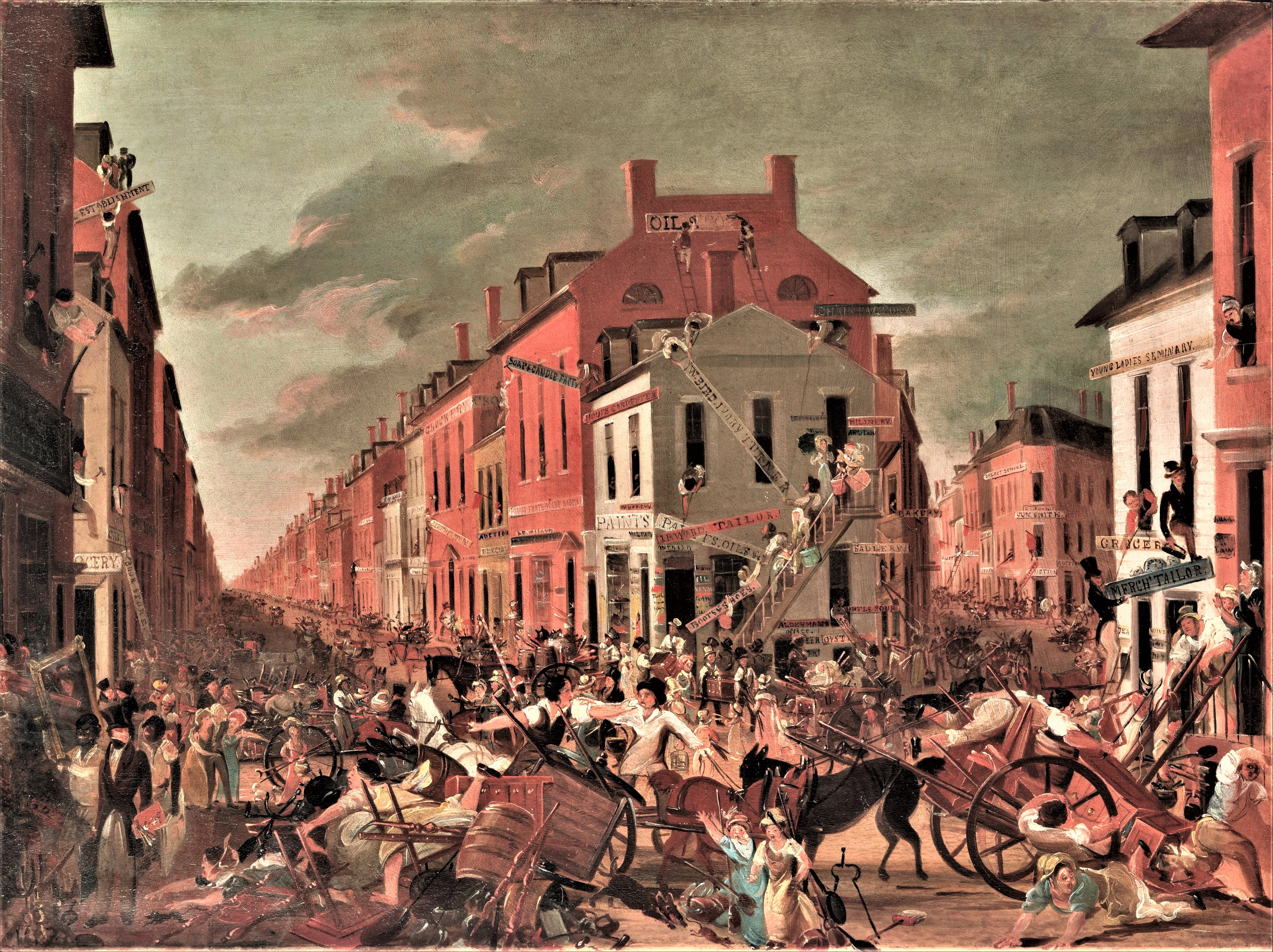
Moving Day in Little Old New York, satirical painting, c.1827

Moving Day was a tradition in New York City dating back to colonial times and lasting until after World War II. On February 1, sometimes known as "Rent Day", landlords would give notice to their tenants what the new rent would be after the end of the quarter, and the tenants would spend good-weather days in the early spring searching for new houses and the best deals. On May 1, all oral leases (the majority of tenants) in the city expired simultaneously at 9:00 am, causing thousands of people to change their residences, all at the same time.

The tradition was likely derived from the practice of verhuisdag, with contracts in the Netherlands generally ending on May 1, while The Encyclopedia of New York City links it instead to the English celebration of May Day. Washington Irving's satirical 1809 novel A History of New York gives an origin myth centering on a movement on that date of early Dutch colonists on the Communipaw Ferry route across the Hudson from New Jersey, while later fanciful writers such as Arthur Guiterman ascribe it as the date of the first crossing across the Atlantic from the Netherlands. While it may have originated as a custom, the tradition took force of law by an 1820 act of the New York State Legislature, which mandated that if no other date was specified, all housing contracts were valid to the first of May – unless the day fell on a Sunday, in which case the deadline was May 2.

== History ==
In 1799, an observer commented that New Yorkers "are seized on the first of May, by a sort of madness, that will not let them rest till they have changed their dwelling." Because there were not enough cartmen to handle all the traffic, farmers would come from Long Island and New Jersey to rent out their wagons at high prices. By 1820, because of the large increase in the number of propertyless renters, Moving Day had become "pandemonium", with the streets gridlocked with wagons carting household goods. The tradition was still in force in 1848, when the Tenant League denounced it as a way for landlords to raise rents every year. The cost of moving was another concern, as cartmen sometimes charged more than the official rates set by city ordinances – people were known to pay up to a week's wages to be moved – and the truckman might, if the customer refused to pay on delivery, take their belongings to Police Headquarters, charging for the additional transportation.

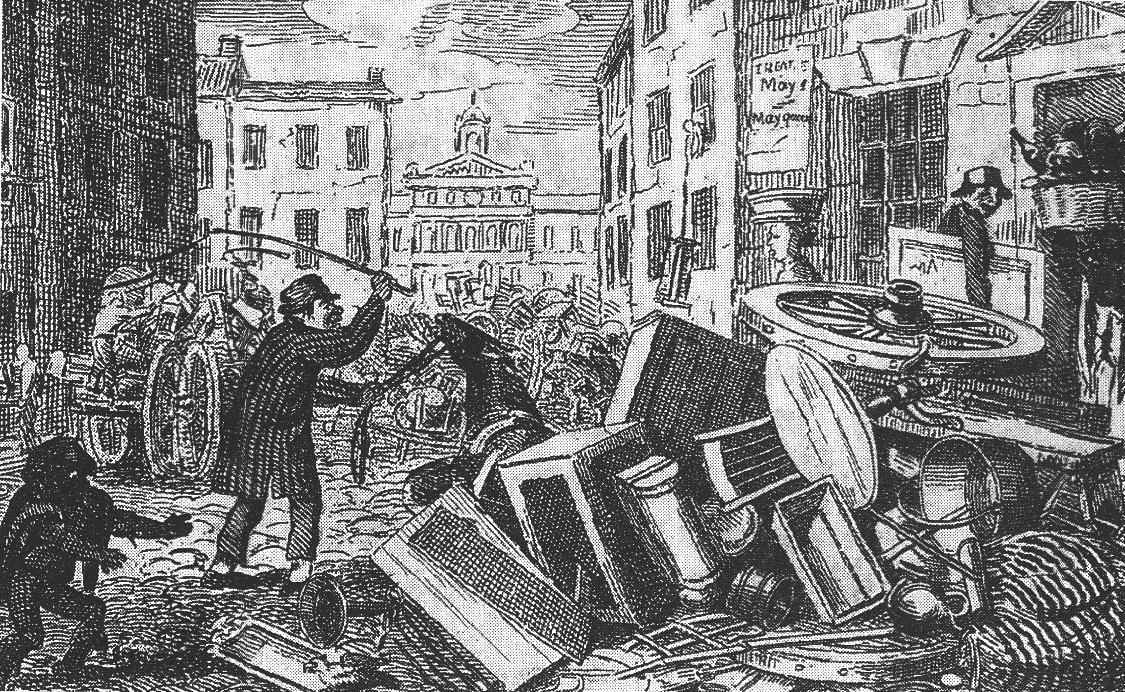
A cart full of furniture upset on Moving Day, 1831

By 1856, some erosion of the strict adherence to the custom of Moving Day was noted, as some people moved a few days before or after the traditional day, creating, in effect, a "moving week". Once the economic depression of 1873 was over, more housing was constructed, dropping the price of housing down, and subsequently people had less need to move as often.

=== Second Moving Day ===
Near the end of the 19th century, many people began leaving the city for the cooler suburbs in the heat of summertime, and as a result October 1 became a second Moving Day, as people returning to the city would take their belongings out of storage and move into their newly rented homes. The October date may be related to the English custom of paying land rents on Michaelmas, which falls on September 29. Eventually, the October date began to supplant the traditional May date, so that by 1922 the Van Owners Association reported only a "moderate flurry" of activity on the Spring day. The movers also attempted to get legislation passed to spread out the Fall rush to three dates: the firsts of September, October and November. Over time, the tradition of a specific Moving Day began to fade, with the remnant evident in commercial leases, which still generally run out on May 1 or October 1.

At the height of Moving Day in the early 20th century, it was estimated that a million people in the city all changed their residences at the same time. Resistance to Moving Day was strong in the 1920s and 1930s, while it still made cultural appearances as in the 1926 Broadway song "Mountain Greenery", but it took the start of World War II to end the general practice, as the moving industry found it difficult to find able-bodied men to do the work. The post-war housing shortage and the advent of rent control finally put an end to the custom for good. By 1945, a newspaper headline announced "Housing Shortage Erases Moving Day."

=== Common Law Basis ===
The basis for Moving Day within NYC was from English common law that had remained present within NYC, and other American cities. It existed as a form of tenant protection from at will eviction, for those without a written lease. The vast majority of tenants at the time depended on oral leases, a practice that existed under common law that had the same legal status as written leases.

Importantly, an old legal statute reenacted in 1896, stated that leases of unspecified duration would expire on May 1 annually. Effectively making any oral lease a year long. For this reason, a tenant could legally challenge a landlord who asked for a rent increase on October 1 on the grounds they had oral agreements that fixed the price of the rent until April 30.

== Descriptions ==
In her 1832 book Domestic Manners of Americans, English writer Frances Trollope, mother of novelist Anthony Trollope, described the city on Moving Day:

On the 1st of May the city of New York has the appearance of sending off a population flying from the plague, or of a town which had surrendered on condition of carrying away all their goods and chattels. Rich furniture and ragged furniture, carts, wagons, and drays, ropes, canvas, and straw, packers, porters, and draymen, white, yellow, and black, occupy the streets from east to west, from north to south, on this day. Every one I spoke to on the subject complained of this custom as most annoying, but all assured me it was unavoidable, if you inhabit a rented house. More than one of my New York friends have built or bought houses solely to avoid this annual inconvenience.

John Pintard, a co-founder of the New-York Historical Society described moving day in a letter to his daughter Eliza in 1832 or 1833:

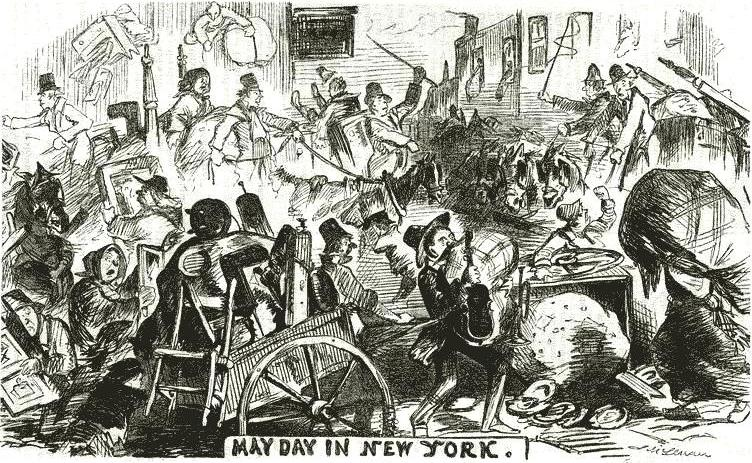
The chaos of Moving Day in New York City in 1856

Tuesday 1st May. Hazy, raw. Yest[erda]y was very unfavorable for the general moving of our great city. High rents, incommodious dwellings, & necessity combine to crowd our streets with carts overloaded with furniture & hand barrows with sofas, chairs, sideboards, looking glasses & pictures, so as to render the sidewalks almost impassable. The practice of all moving on one day, & give up & hiring Houses in Feb[ruar]y is of an antient [sic] custom & when the city was small & inhabitants few in number, almost every body owned or continued for years tenants in the same houses. Few instances of removals were seen, but now N[ew] York is literally in an uproar for several days before & after the 1st of May. This practice of move all, to strangers appears absurd, but it is attended with the advantage of affording a greater choice of abodes in the Feb[ruar]y quarter.

Frontiersman Davy Crockett described his experience of Moving Day when he came to the city to be guest of honor at a dinner given by the Whig Party in 1834:

By the time we returned down Broadway, it seemed to me that the city was flying before some awful calamity. "Why," said I, "Colonel, what under heaven is the matter? Everyone appears to be pitching out their furniture, and packing it off." He laughed, and said this was the general "moving day." Such a sight nobody ever saw unless it was in this same city. It seemed a kind of frolic, as if they were changing houses just for fun. Every street was crowded with carts, drays, and people. So the world goes. It would take a good deal to get me out of my log-house; but here, I understand, many persons "move" every year.

"Mrs. Felton", in her 1843 book American Life: A Narrative of Two Years' City And Country Residence in the United States gives another Englishwoman's perspective on the tradition:

By an established custom, the houses are let from this day [May 1st] for the term of one year certain; and, as the inhabitants in general love variety, and seldom reside in the same house for two consecutive years, those who have to change, which appears to be nearly the whole city, must be all removed together. Hence, from the peep of day till twilight, may be seen carts which go at a rate of speed astonishingly rapid, laden with furniture of every kind, racing up and down the city, as if its inhabitants were flying from a pestilence, pursued by death with his broad scythe just ready to mow them into eternity.

In 1855, the New York Times look forward to that year's Moving Day:

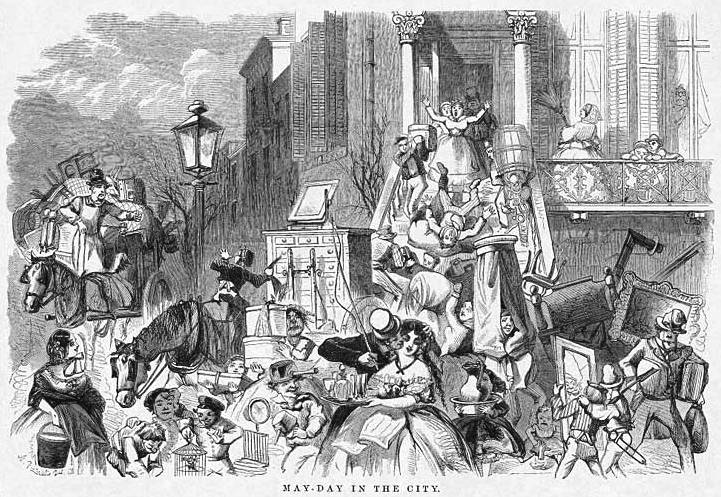
Moving Day in 1859, from Harper's Weekly

It will begin early – before some of us are up, no doubt, and it will continue late. The sidewalks will be worse obstructed in every street than Wall-street is where the brokers are in full blast. Old beds and ricketty bedstands, handsome pianos and kitchen furniture, will be chaotically huddled together. Everything will be in a muddle. Everybody in a hurry, smashing mirrors in his haste, and carefully guarding boot boxes from harm. Sofas that go out sound will go in maimed, tables that enjoyed castors will scratch along and "tip" on one less than its complement. Bed-screws will be lost in the confusion, and many a good piece of furniture badly bruised in consequence. Family pictures will be sadly marred, and the china will be a broken set before night, in many a house. All houses will be dirty – never so dirty – into which people move, and the dirt of the old will seem enviable beside the cleanliness of the new. The old people will in their hearts murmur at these moving dispensations. The younger people, though aching in every bone, and "tired to death," will relish the change, and think the new closets more roomy and more nice, and delight themselves fancying how this piece of furniture will look here and that piece in the other corner. The still "younger ones" will still more enjoy it. Into the cellar and upon the roof, into the rat-holes and on the yard fence, into each room and prying into every cupboard, they mill make reprisals of many things "worth saving," and mark the day white in their calendar, as little less to be longed for in the return than Fourth of July itself.

Keep your tempers, good people. Don't growl at the carmen nor haggle over the price charged. When the scratched furniture comes in don't believe it is utterly ruined, – a few nails, a little glue, a piece of putty, and a pint of varnish will rejuvenate many articles that will grow very old 'twixt morning and night, and undo much of the mischief that comes of moving, and which at first sight seems irreparable.

George Templeton Strong, a prominent New York lawyer, described Moving Day in his diary:

May 1. Fine weather, to the great comfort of the locomotive public. Never knew the city in such a chaotic state. Every other house seems to be disgorging itself into the street; all the sidewalks are lumbered with bureaus and bedsteads to the utter destruction of their character as thoroughfares, and all the space between the sidewalks is occupied by long processions of carts and wagons and vehicles omnigenous laden with perilous piles of moveables. We certainly haven't advanced as a people beyond the nomadic or migratory stage of civilization analogous to that of the pastoral cow feeders of the Tartar Steppes.

In 1865, the Times described the attitude of the "carmen" on Moving Day:

On the 1st of May, too, the carman becomes a different creature. Not particularly civil at any time, on moving day he must be approached with caution. He has become lord of the ascendant. Ordinary offers do not tempt him. He has been known to laugh to scorn a man who offered him $5 to convey a load half a dozen blocks. He declines making any previous engagements. He seeks no customers, but rather conveys the idea that he would prefer to be let alone. At the same time he keeps a sharp eye to business, and only accepts an offer when he knows he can't beat a cent more out of his customer. And then when he is engaged, he goes about his work with supremest indifference. ... He is above all ordinances; he is a creation of the day; to-morrow he will be a mere carman, amenable to law and standing in fear of the Mayor's Marshal.

Lydia Maria Child, the editor of the abolitionist newspaper National Anti-Slavery Standard, described Moving Day in her Letters from New-York:

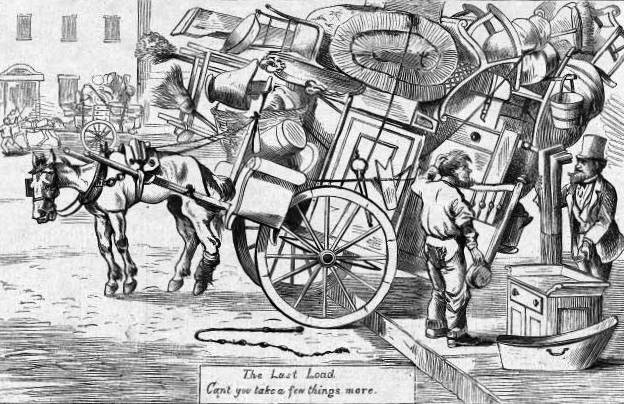
In 1869, a customer asks a cartman: "Can't you take a few things more?" (Harper's Weekly)

[A]ll New-York moves on the first of May; not only moves about, as usual, in the everlasting hurry-scurry of business, but one house empties itself into another, all over the city. The streets are full of loaded drays, on which tables are dancing, and carpets rolling to and fro. Small chairs, which bring up such pretty, cozy images of rolly-pooly mannikens and maidens, eating supper from tilted porringers, and spilling the milk on their night-gowns – these go ricketting along on the tops of beds and bureaus, and not unfrequently pitch into the street, and so fall asunder. Children are driving hither and yon, one with a flower-pot in his hand, another with work-box, band-box, or oil-canakin; each so intent upon his important mission, that all the world seems to him (as it does to many a theologican,) safely locked up within the little walls he carries. Luckily, both boy and bigot are mistaken, or mankind would be in a bad box, sure enough. The dogs seem bewildered with this universal transmigration of bodies; and as for the cats, they sit on the door-steps, mewing piteously, that they were not born in the middle ages, or at least in the quiet old portion of the world. And I, who have almost as strong a love of localities as poor puss, turn away from the windows, with a suppressed anathema on the nineteenth century, with its perpetual changes. Do you want an appropriate emblem of this country, and this age? Then stand on the side-walks of New-York, and watch the universal transit on the first of May ... However, human being are such creatures of habit and imitation, that what is necessity soon becomes fashion, and each one wishes to do what everyone else is doing. A lady in the neighbourhood closed all her binds and shutters, on May-day; being asked by her acquaintance whether she had been in the country, she answered, "I was ashamed not to be moving on the first of May; and so I shut up the house that the neighbours might not know it." One could not well imagine a fact more characteristic of the despotic sway of custom and public opinion, in the United States, and the nineteenth century.

== See also ==
- May Day
- Michaelmas
- Moving (address)
- Moving Day (Boston)
- Moving Day (Quebec)
