= Tracy Beaker Returns series 1 =

Tracy Beaker Returns
- Series 1
- Title card
- Starring: Dani Harmer; Lisa Coleman; Connor Byrne; Kay Purcell; Saffron Coomber; Chris Slater; Richard Wisker; John Bell; Joe Maw; Jessie Williams; Amy-Leigh Hickman; Mia McKenna Bruce; Noah Marullo; Philip Graham Scott; Claudia Colling; Katie Anderson
- No. of episodes: 13

Release
- Original network: CBBC
- Original release: 8 January – 26 March 2010

Series chronology
- ← Previous; The Story of Tracy Beaker Series 5 Next → Series 2

The first series of the British children's television series Tracy Beaker Returns was broadcast from 8 January 2010 on CBBC and ended on 26 March 2010. Based on the novels by Jacqueline Wilson, the series focuses on older Tracy Beaker, who returns to the Dumping Ground as a care worker. It also focuses the lives of the children living in the fictional children's care home of Elmtree House, nicknamed by them "The Dumping Ground". It consists of thirteen thirty-minute episodes. It was the sixth series in The Story of Tracy Beaker franchise.

== Cast ==
=== Main ===
- Dani Harmer as Tracy Beaker (return)
- Lisa Coleman as Cam Lawson (return)
- Connor Byrne as Mike Milligan (return)
- Kay Purcell as Gina Conway (from episode 1)
- Saffron Coomber as Sapphire Fox (from episode 1)
- Chris Slater as Frank Matthews (from episode 1)
- Richard Wisker as Liam O'Donovan (from episode 1)
- John Bell as Toby Coleman (from episode 1)
- Joe Maw as Johnny Taylor (from episode 1)
- Jessie Williams as Lily Kettle (episodes 1-5 but returned in episode 8)
- Amy-Leigh Hickman as Carmen Howle (from episode 1)
- Mia McKenna Bruce as Tee Taylor (from episode 1)
- Noah Marullo as Gus Carmichael (from episode 1)
- Philip-Graham Scott as Harry Jones (from episode 1)
- Claudia Colling as Rosie Kettle (episodes 1-5 but made a guest appearance in episode 8)
- Katie Anderson as Poppy Kettle (episodes 1-5 but made a guest appearance in episode 8)

=== Guest ===
- Sarah Lawton as TV Presenter
- Jim Kitson as Sgt. Nelson
- Richard Stacey as Mr Scott
- Joanne Bowden as Mrs Scott
- Vicky Hall as Christie Perry
- Chris Robson as Matt Perry
- Neil Armstrong as Rob
- Sue Bowmer as WI Lady
- Steven Osborne as Vested Man
- Peter Losasso as Ferris Lloyd
- Ian McLaughlin as Cabbie
- Tracy-Ann Oberman as Terrie Fender
- Fiona Wade as Helen Howle
- Jordan Hill as Riff Fox
- Peter Gunn as Service Station Manager
- Ingrid Lacey as Newspaper Editor

== Episodes ==
No.	Title	Directed by	Written by	Original release date	Prod. code
1	"Tracy Beaker Superstar (Full Circle Part 1)"	Neasa Hardiman	Elly Brewer and Ben Ward	8 January 2010	1.1
Tracy Beaker has published a book, but is arrested for using Cam's credit card to publish it. At the police station, Tracy meets Liam and an old friend, Mike. Cam later drops the charges, but Tracy needs a job so she can repay back Cam's money. Mike offers Tracy the job at the Dumping Ground, but Gina thinks Tracy was trouble since she was arrested. First appearance: Kay Purcell as Gina Conway, Saffron Coomber as Sapphire Fox, Chris Slater as Frank Matthews, Richard Wisker as Liam O'Donavan, John Bell as Toby Coleman, Joe Maw as Johnny Taylor, Jessie Williams as Lily Kettle, Amy-Leigh Hickman as Carmen Howle, Noah Marullo as Gus Charmical, Mia McKenna-Bruce as Tee Taylor, Phillip Graham Scott as Harry Jones, Claudia Colling as Rosie Kettle and Katie Anderson as Poppy Kettle. Returned and longest-serving characters: Dani Harmer as Tracy Beaker, Connor Byrne as Mike Milligan and Lisa Coleman as Cam Lawson.
2	"New Life's Eve (Full Circle Part 2)"	Neasa Hardiman	Elly Brewer and Ben Ward	8 January 2010	1.2
It was Tracy's first day at the Dumping Ground and already she is late for work. She made a promise to the kids, but she breaks it and upsets Gus on his guided tour. Tracy then finds a letter from her real mum in the filing cabinets in the office that was hidden when Tracy was in the Dumping Ground and which Mike and Cam have been hiding for years. Liam returns to the Dumping Ground after being kicked out by his foster parents, and Lily is jealous when Carmen begins mothering Poppy and Rosie.
3	"Bad Luck Boy"	Neasa Hardiman	Jonathan Evans	15 January 2010	1.3
Toby was convinced that he is jinxed, but Tracy tries to prove that there is no such thing has bad luck and Toby will be meeting his new foster family. Tracy writes an article about Toby called "Bad Luck Boy", but ends up regretting her actions when she finds out that Toby's parents died in a car crash for which he has blamed himself ever since. Meanwhile, Sapphire has got concert tickets from her dad, but Gina won't let her go because her dad is irresponsible.
4	"By The Book"	Neasa Hardiman	Steven Turner	22 January 2010	1.4
When Tracy was told to enforce the cleaning rota, Johnny believes it will get him and his sister, Tee, fostered and starts volunteering himself and Tee for everyone's chores in return for gold stars in his file. But Tracy's attempt to deal with the situation results in Tee nearly getting injured, and she was forced to reconsider her future at the Dumping Ground, whilst Johnny realises he has anger problems. Meanwhile, Liam and best friend Frank try to make money by selling copies of Tracy's book, but the books end up being taken away to the recycling centre. This was the first time that Johnny and Tee's mum and her boyfriend are mentioned.
5	"Family Values"	Craig Lines	James Nicol and Jonathan Wolfman	29 January 2010	1.5
When Lily and her sisters get fostered, Carmen's loneliness puts her into conflict with the other residents when they shun her due to having problems of their own. But a devastated Carmen takes this personally and plots revenge on everyone, prompting Tracy to take actions to unite the kids. Departed: Jessie Williams as Lily Kettle, Claudia Colling as Rosie Kettle, Katie Anderson as Poppy Kettle.
6	"Anarchy In The DG"	Craig Lines	Elly Brewer and Ben Ward	5 February 2010	1.6
Gina was out, and Mike is sick — leaving Tracy in charge of a night shift. Gina doesn't trust her because things will go bad when Tracy is around with kids. In the Dumping Ground, things have gone bad: Liam and Frank have gone out selling pizzas; Carmen and Tee's bedtimes have been shifted; Sapphire asks Tracy if she can have a bolt for the door of her room and, when Tracy agrees, takes the bolt off the toilet door; Gus's room is wrecked by Sapphire; and Gus pees in the wastepaper bin in Sapphire's bedroom. Can Tracy resolved this problem or will she get sacked?
7	"Secrets"	Craig Lines	Emma Reeves	12 February 2010	1.7
Tracy finds stolen video games in Sapphire's room and soon discovers they don't belong to her. Meanwhile, Liam and Frank find out that Gus's notebooks are filled with people's secrets, through which Liam, Frank, Gina and Mike find out a lot more about each other. Tracy then discovers that Sapphire's boyfriend, Ferris, has been stealing the goods and giving them to Sapphire to hide in her room; after Ferris tells Tracy what happened, Ferris decides to take back what he stole and they both go back to the Dumping Ground. When Tracy calls a police officer she knows to come and discuss her newspaper columns, Ferris gets the wrong idea when the officer arrives at the Dumping Ground and claims that Sapphire stole the games. After much arguing, Ferris finally owns up to what he did and is taken away along with the evidence. Gus finally finds out that people have been reading his notebooks, but surprisingly says that they can look at them whenever they feel like — but only with his permission first.
8	"Sisters"	Craig Lines	Elly Brewer and Ben Ward	19 February 2010	1.8
Following an incident with her foster parents about the custody of Rosie and Poppy, Lily is sent back to the Dumping Ground. Tracy tries to show Matt and Christie Perry that Lily has learned her lesson, but Lily becomes maternal again and shouts at Matt and Christie for giving Poppy tuna. Meanwhile, Tee hides a sheep in the Dumping Ground, and Gus is desperate to get to his orchestra audition on time. Tracy decides to take Lily to Rosie and Poppy's new home to try to get the foster parents to see that Lily wants to be a family, but this all goes wrong as Lily then shouts at the foster parents for giving Poppy tuna, which Lily says she doesn't like. Lily accidentally makes her sisters cry, and the foster parents tell Tracy and Lily to never return to their house. Finally, Gus gets to the audition on time, but is too late to start, so Tracy takes them back to the Dumping Ground where the people from the auditions come to the Dumping Ground to see Gus finally play. Meanwhile, Tee enlists Sapphire's help in acquiring a pet sheep, but soon realises it is too much for her. Returned: Jessie Williams as Lily Kettle. Guest appearance Claudia Colling as Rosie Kettle, Katie Anderson as Poppy Kettle. Last appearance: Claudia Colling as Rosie Kettle.
9	"Good Luck Boy"	Michael Davies	Emma Reeves	26 February 2010	1.9
Toby and all the other boys at the Dumping Ground have to lie about being a family when they win a free holiday to Florida. However, the competition announcer, Terrie, tricks them into buying the holiday with Mike's credit card. Meanwhile, Tracy is learning how to drive under Cam's guidance, and Carmen is determined to cheer Lily up so she decides to get her a hamster named Mr. Hamster in order to make her happy again. Toby and the other boys decide that they have been scammed and they break into Terrie's office and Toby steals the memory stick with all Terrie's files on it containing past clients' information. Terrie chases after them, but Toby phones Tracy while taking her driving test to drive them back to the Dumping Ground. When they return, Mike has already discovered that they had used his credit card. Terrie follows them back to the house and orders Toby to give back the memory stick he stole and says it was his fault for telling them that he was over 18, but listening back on the phone conversation this turns out to be untrue and Terrie is finally defeated and gives back Mike's money. To make Toby happy about not winning the holiday, Lily and Carmen give Mr. Hamster to him.
10	"Viva Carmen"	Michael Davies	Elly Brewer and Ben Ward	5 March 2010	1.10
Carmen's mother, Helen, turns up at the Dumping Ground wanting to see her daughter, but Carmen refuses to see her after many years ago, Helen Howle left Carmen for her boyfriend Lee. Helen tells Mike that she has changed her ways. After having a talk with Lily, Carmen decides to go out shopping with Helen. Helen asks Carmen to come and live with her in Spain, she gives Carmen some time to decide to take the offer or to leave it. Mike tells Carmen that she can go and live with Helen if she wants to. Meanwhile, Tracy, Mike and Gina trick the kids into thinking there's been a power cut, because there's been a lot of arguments, so they all have a barbecue as a family. Carmen decides that she should take the chance and go and live with her mother in Spain, but before leaving, Helen's old boyfriend, Lee, phones her and Helen tells Carmen that Lee and her have decided to give the relationship another go and that Carmen can come and live with them when they buy a bigger place. Carmen and Mike then order Helen to leave the Dumping Ground once and for all, but Tracy wants the last word and tells Helen that she has always been thinking of herself, that she is selfish, and tells Helen to go back to Spain and never return to the Dumping Ground.
11	"The Werewolf"	Michael Davies	Steven Turner	12 March 2010	1.11
When playing a simple game of football, Carmen goes to fetch the ball which has been kicked into the bush, but then sees something that looks like a werewolf in the bush which makes her scream. Mike investigates the bush to see if anything is inside it, but finds nothing. Carmen insists that the monster is alive and is hiding somewhere. Sapphire later finds out that the "werewolf" is none other than her brother, Riff Fox, who has run away from home to see her. Sapphire tries to hide Riff from everyone, but all the kids except Carmen soon find out and they all decide to keep the secret from Gina and Mike. Carmen then spots Riff for a brief second and asks who it is, but Sapphire tells her that it is a ghost that lives in the Dumping Ground so Carmen decides to lock herself in her room until everyone believes her stories are true. Riff decides to follow his heart and find his father. Sapphire tries to make Riff stay, but ends up agreeing to go with him, but when Tracy spots them at the bus stop, Sapphire realizes that the Dumping Ground isn't all that bad. Riff decides to go back home, but before he does he gives Sapphire his new phone and tells her to ring him at any time. Just as they hug each other, Carmen walks downstairs and, seeing Riff for the first time, shouts "Ghost!", thinking that he was still the ghost.
12	"A Day At The Beach"	Michael Davies	Jonathan Evans	19 March 2010	1.12
Mike Gina Tracy and the DG kids go to the beach for the day Tee ends up being sick on the minibus they go to the services which they cause trouble by the manager when Tee and Carmen buy a beach ball and a seahorse they accidentally knocked down the sweets confectionery then they are hungry until Toby loses his hamster but they run down on petrol and they realise the person who ruined the day was Johnny when he didn’t want to go to the beach at all.
13	"Moving On"	Michael Davies	Elly Brewer and Ben Ward	26 March 2010	1.13
Tracy was offered a job in London to become a full-time reporter, but she has to write a test article on the kids in care. When she tells the kids, they lose their tempers and refuse to help her because they all want her to stay. Mike asks Cam to consider fostering one of the other kids if Tracy leaves, but Cam says she can't if Tracy doesn't get the job because the kids won't co-operate. Johnny overhears this conversation and wants to be fostered by Cam so he and Tee help Tracy. Lily refuses to help as she thinks that if Tracy goes; then she can't get back with Poppy and Rosie. Johnny confronts Lily and tells her Tee will help Tracy Lily then comes back with "You don't decide what Tee does" and then they argue until Johnny says "Just cos' you lost your sisters don't start poking your nose in with mine", Lily gets mad and starts hitting Johnny. (However, unlike in Drained where Johnny retaliates when Carmen attacks him, he doesn't lay a finger on Lily. Instead, he looks really upset with what he's done.) Eventually, every child helps Tracy in secrecy so no other children know. Tracy takes the article to the editor who gives her the job. Surprisingly, Tracy turns down the job, claiming that the Dumping Ground is the place she wants to be, saying that she would miss the kids too much. Despite this, the article I’das published in the newspaper, and the kids realise they all helped, and Tracy was welcomed back to the Dumping Ground once more.
