= Moving scam =

Scam tactic

A moving scam is a scam by a moving company in which the company provides an estimate, loads the goods, then states a much higher price to deliver the goods, effectively holding the goods as lien.

== History ==
The moving business in the United States was deregulated with the Household Goods Transportation Act of 1980. This act allowed interstate movers to issue binding or fixed estimates for the first time. Doing so allowed hundreds of new moving companies to begin operations. This led to an increase in competition and soon movers were no longer competing on services but on price. As competition drove prices lower and decreased what were already slim profit margins, "rogue" movers began hijacking personal property as part of a new scam. The Federal Motor Carrier Safety Administration (FMCSA) enforces Federal customer protection regulations related to the interstate shipment of household goods (i.e., household moves that cross State lines). FMCSA has held this responsibility since 1999, and the Department of Transportation has held this responsibility since 1995 (the Interstate Commerce Commission held this authority prior to its termination in 1995).

== Scam ==
There are many versions to the moving scam, but the basic scam begins with a prospective client contacting a purported licensed moving company and requesting a cost estimate. In today's market this often happens online via moving company marketing websites. These moving companies can be prone to quoting sometimes too low, but usually reasonable prices with no room for the movers to provide a gratuity incentive to provide quality service without upselling packing services.

Once the moving company has secured a move by providing a non-binding or binding estimate, they arrive to pack and deliver the goods and the foreman, a trained loading professional performs a visual estimate. Often the scam movers use deceptive pricing or weight (which is not based on actual weight, figure of cubic footage) measurements including prices based on the gross weight of the moving vehicle. After packing and loading, the client is informed that their goods went over the expected weight estimate and the additional weight will be charged at a substantially higher rate (often double the original price per pound). Rogue movers will not inform a client of these discrepancies until the client's goods have been weighed at a certifiable scale, far from the client's original pickup location. The new price may be four or five times higher than the original estimate. The scam movers know that most people will be forced to pay these exorbitant rates based on their need for the personal effects.

== Regulation ==
The interstate moving business in America is regulated by the Federal Motor Carrier Safety Administration (FMCSA), part of the United States Department of Transportation. Moving companies can provide and often display a Department of Transportation (DOT) license.

Moving companies that operate within the borders of a particular state are usually regulated by the state department of transportation or the public utilities commission or another in that state. This applies to some of the US states like in California (California Public Utilities Commission) and Texas (Texas Department of Motor Vehicles).

There are some US federal laws which govern moving cost estimates. For instance, in the case of out-of-state moves, movers must perform an in-person survey of a client's goods before giving an estimate unless a physical survey waiver agreement is signed; furthermore, this estimate must be in writing. In addition, estimates can be either binding (a set fee, regardless of weight), binding not-to-exceed (based on weight but with a maximum fee), or non-binding (based on weight).

== See also ==
- American Moving & Storage Association
- List of national and international moving associations
