= Relocation (personal) =

Moving from one dwelling to another

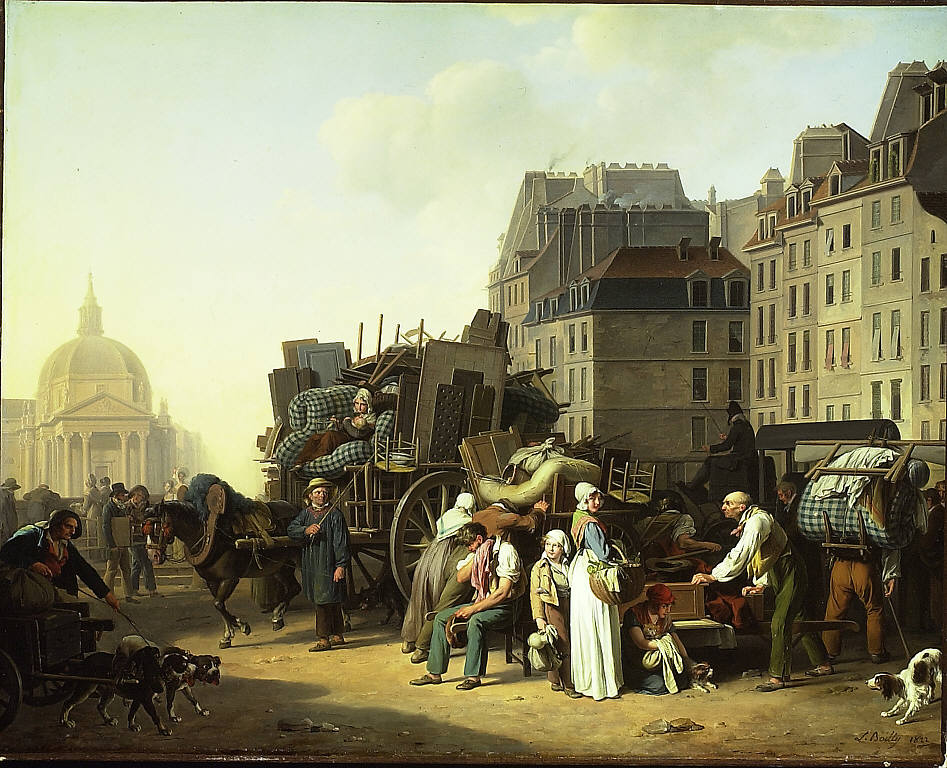
Painting of a family moving in the 19th century

Relocation, also known as moving, or moving house, is the process of leaving one's dwelling and settling in another. The new location can be in the same neighborhood or a much further place in a different city or different country. It usually includes packing all belongings, transferring to the new home, unpacking, and administrative or bureaucratic tasks, such as changing registration data.

An expatriate is an individual temporarily or permanently relocating to a country other than their native country. The individual relocating would be considered an immigrant in their new country.

== Psychological effects ==
On the Holmes and Rahe Stress Scale for adults, "change of residence" is considered a stressful activity, assigned 20 points (with the death of a spouse being ranked the highest at 100), although other changes on the scale (e.g., "change in living conditions", "change in social activities") often occur as a result of relocating, making the overall stress level potentially higher.

Various studies have found that moving house is often particularly stressful for children and is sometimes associated with long-term psychological problems.

Pressure points for international assignees include challenges of a new job, inability to participate in activities available at home, loss of peer support, language and other cultural difficulties, and worker's spouse being unable to find work.

== Assistance ==
Relocation may be supported by a relocation service, which assists people in finding and moving into a new house, organizing a school for children, conducting local culture training, and supporting integration into the new location and culture.

Some jurisdictions subsidize relocations. Some target remote workers to enhance the local workforce and tax base.

== Governance ==
There may be a legal requirement for individuals to notify authorities of a change of address if they maintain a driver's license or vehicle registration, voter registration, are on parole, or are eligible for conscription (as with the Selective Service System). Some loans require the borrower to notify the lender of address changes.

In the United States, moving companies must provide the customers with a booklet "Your Rights and Responsibilities When You Move" created by the Federal Motor Carrier Safety Administration (FMCSA).

Immigration law impacts the requirements and feasibility of moving to another country.

== See also ==
- Emigration
- Human migration
- Immigration
- Migrant worker
- Military brat
- Moving company
- Moving scam
- Moving Day (New York City)
- Moving Day (Quebec)
- Population transfer
- Relocation service
- Shipping container
- Snowbird (person)
- Structure relocation
- Third culture kid
