= Moving company =

Business that provides packing and moving services for relocation

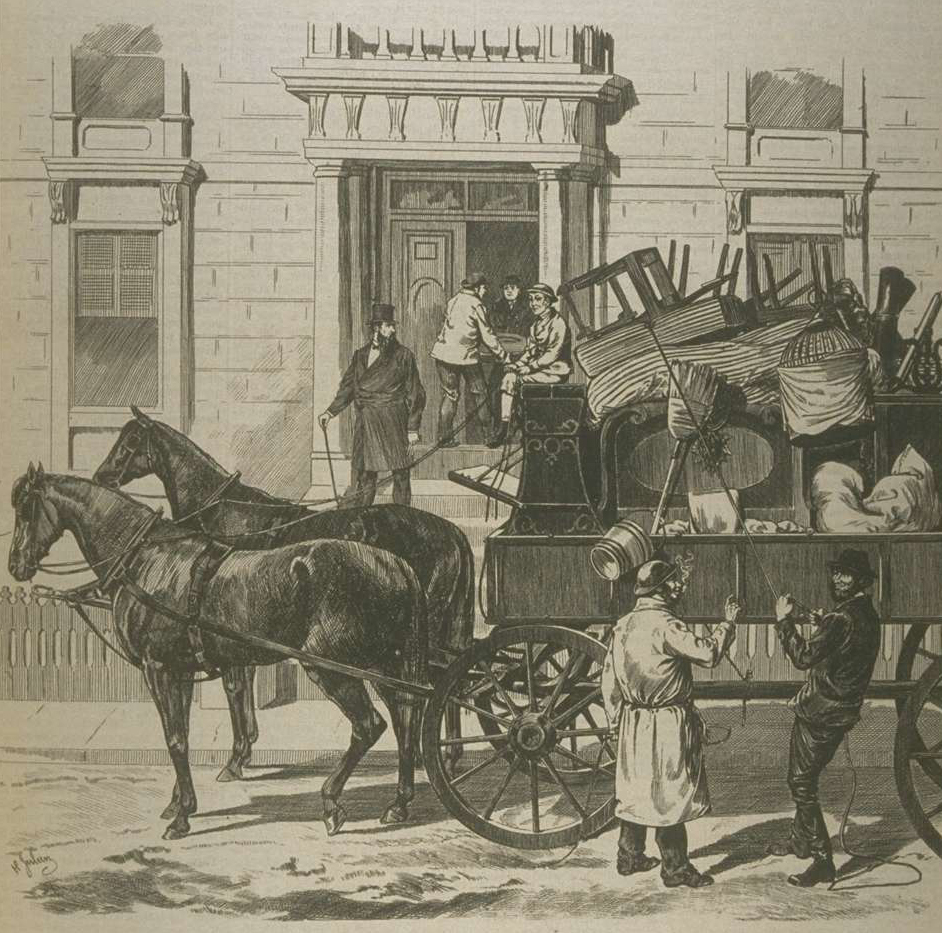
Early movers in Montréal, Québec, 1876

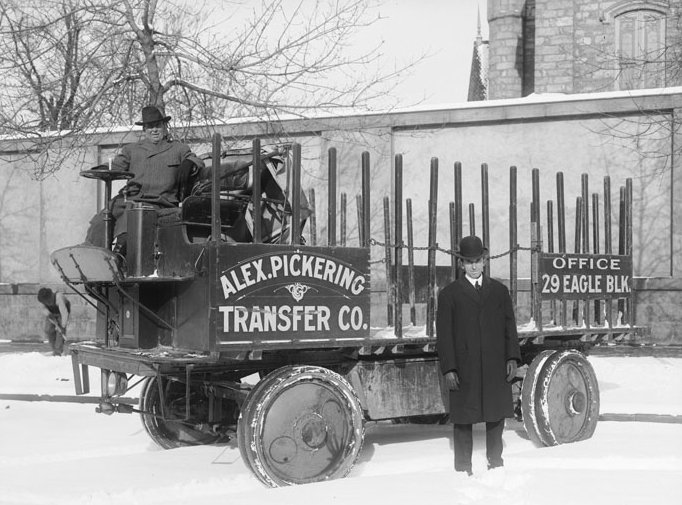
Movers in Salt Lake City, 1911

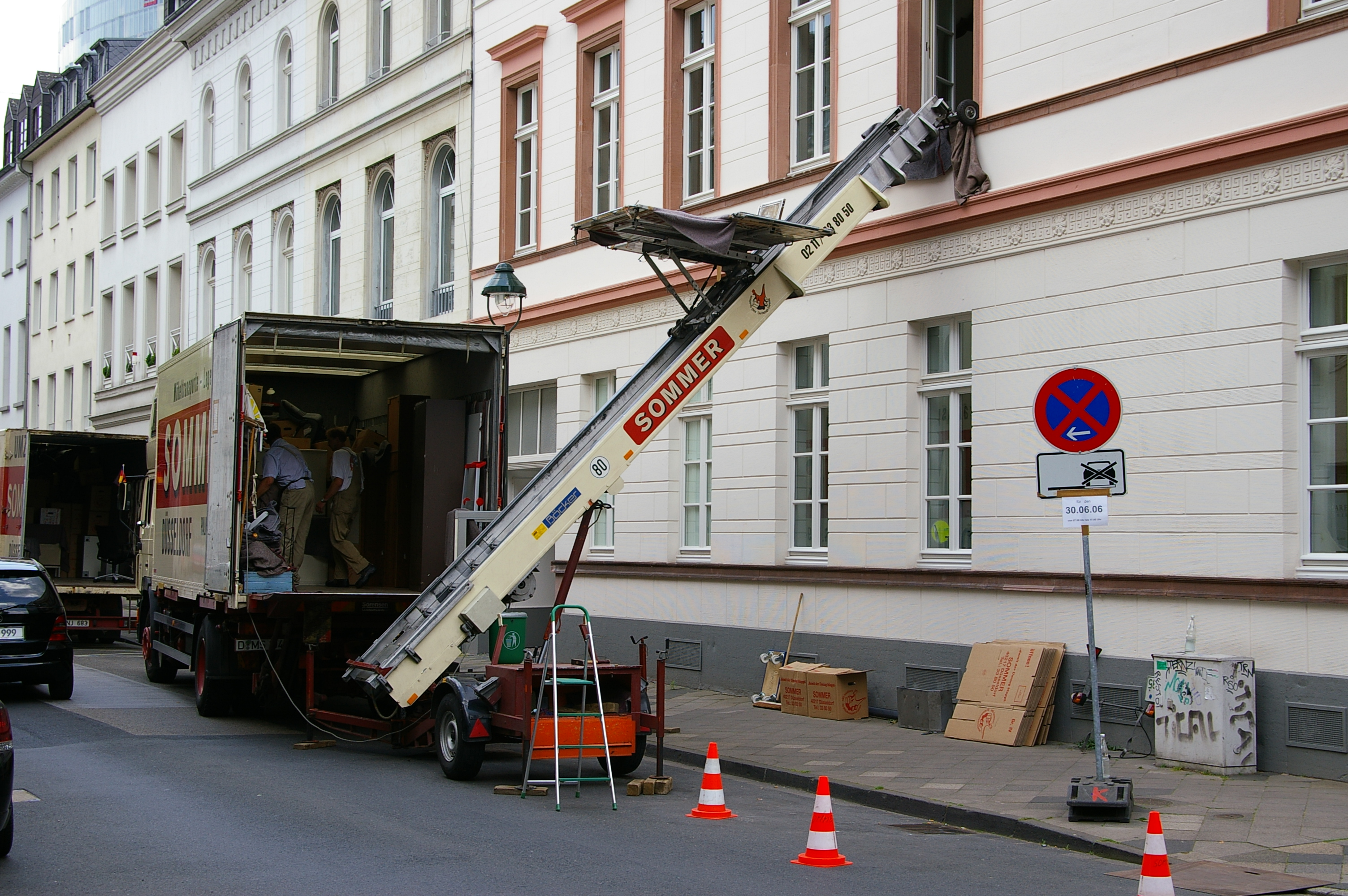
Moving van and lift in Germany, 2007

A moving company, also known as a removalist or van line, is a company that specializes in assisting individuals and businesses with relocating their goods from one location to another. Moving companies may offer additional or all-inclusive services for relocations, like packing, loading, moving, unloading, unpacking, and arranging of items to be shifted. Additional services may include cleaning services for houses, offices or warehousing facilities.

== Overview ==
=== United States ===
According to the U.S. Census Bureau, in 2007, 40 million United States citizens had moved annually over the previous decade. Of these movers, 84.5% relocated within their own state, 12.5% moved to another state, and 2.3% moved to another country.

The U.S. Department of Defense is the largest household goods shipper in the world, with the Personal Property Program accounting for 20% of all moves.

A 2020 OnePoll survey showed that 64% of participants consider their recent move to be one of the most stressful events they have ever encountered.

=== United Kingdom ===
In the United Kingdom, the removals sector carries out approximately 1.2 million household moves each year and has an annual turnover of £1.2 billion, according to a 2026 report published by the British Association of Removers in partnership with the Policy Liaison Group for Housing Delivery & Growth. The report identifies more than 5,600 such companies operating across the UK, employing around 28,500 people.

== Pricing and services ==
=== United States and Canada ===
In the U.S. and Canada, the cost for long-distance moves is generally determined by several factors:

- Weight of the items to be moved
- Distance between the original and new location
- Speed of the move
- Timing of the move, including the specific time of year or month

Some movers also offer consolidated shipping, which reduces costs by transporting several clients' items in the same shipment.

=== United Kingdom and Australia ===
In the United Kingdom and Australia, the price is based on the volume of the items rather than their weight. Some movers may offer flat rate pricing based on the number of rooms or bedrooms.

== DIY moving ==
The use of truck rental services, or simply borrowing similar hardware, is referred to as DIY moving. Individuals or families may rent a truck or trailer large enough to transport their household goods. They may also acquire moving equipment such as dollies, furniture pads, and cargo belts to facilitate the move and protect their belongings.

== Packing and materials ==
The moving process also involves finding or buying materials such as boxes, paper, tape, and bubble wrap with which to pack boxable and/or protect fragile household goods and to consolidate the carrying and stacking on moving day. Self-service moving companies offer another viable option: the person moving buys space on one or more trailers or shipping containers. These containers are then driven by professionals to the new location.

== See also ==
- Manual handling of loads
- Moving scam
- Relocation service
- Structure relocation
- Relocation (personal)
