= Afronauts =

Afronauts may refer to:

- Afronauts (2014 short film), a 2014 American short film that premiered at Sundance Film Festival
- Afronauts (Zambian theater production), a Zambian theater production that performed at 2026 Edinburgh Festival Fringe
- The Afronauts (British play), a British play scheduled to premiere at the Royal Court Theatre in November 2026
- Afronaut, a term coined by Edward Mukuka Nkoloso to describe participants in the Zambian space program
