= BlackStar Film Festival =

Annual film festival hosted in Philadelphia, PA, USA

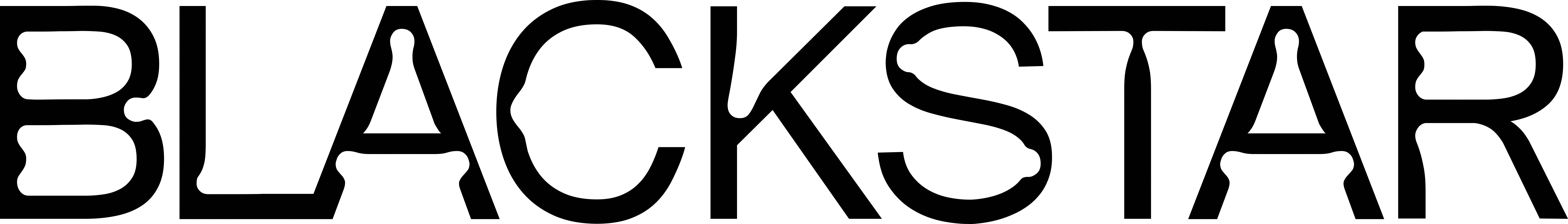
- Location: Philadelphia, United States
- Founded: 2012; 14 years ago
- Founded by: Maori Karmael Holmes
- Festival date: Opening: 6 August 2026; Closing: 9 August 2026
- Language: English, American Sign Language
- Website: www.blackstarprojects.org

The BlackStar Film Festival is an annual film festival organized by BlackStar Projects. The festival focuses on films about and by Black, Brown and Indigenous people from around the world. It takes place each August in Philadelphia, Pennsylvania, United States. It has been described as the "Black Sundance."

The festival is named after Marcus Garvey's shipping line, the Black Star Line. It was founded in 2012 by Maori Karmael Holmes, with the first BlackStar Film Festival initially conceived as a one-day "microfestival" that, due to the large number of submissions, ultimately turned into a four-day international event. Holmes developed the festival due to her view that there were very few film festivals for Black filmmakers, as well as a desire to share stories that go beyond stereotypical representations of people of color. Backers of the festival include the MacArthur Foundation, the Knight Foundation, HBO, CAA, Comcast, and Lionsgate.

The first festival included a master class and screening of part of Middle of Nowhere by Ava DuVernay. Produced by nonprofit BlackStar Projects, that festival included 40 films from four continents. Later festivals have included films by Arthur Jafa, Ja'Tovia Gary, Terence Nance, Jenn Nkiru, Gabourey Sidibe, Janine Sherman Barrois, Darius Clark Monroe, Shatara Michelle Ford, Garrett Bradley, and Naima Ramos-Chapman. Panels have included Bradford Young, Rashid Shabazz, Spike Lee, and Tarana Burke.

Yaba Blay, Akiba Solomon, Ahmir “Questlove” Thompson, and Tariq “Black Thought” Trotter have all previously served on the advisory board of the festival.

In 2024, the festival had over 17,000 attendees.

Sister programming from Blackstar Projects includes Seen, a biannual journal of art and writing; a seminar for artists of color; a fellowship; and exhibitions.

== Notable films featured ==
=== 2012 ===
- Soul Food Junkies
- Middle of Nowhere
- Brooklyn Boheme
- Adopted ID

=== 2013 ===
- Reifying Desire
- Homegoings
- Things Never Said
- Nairobi Half Life

=== 2014 ===
- Afronauts

=== 2015 ===
- Christmas Wedding Baby

=== 2016 ===
- Tell Me Sweet Something
- Love Is the Message, the Message Is Death
- 9 Rides

=== 2017 ===
- Ayiti Mon Amour
- Whose Streets?
- The Tale of Four

=== 2018 ===
- Black Mother
- Douvan Jou Ka Leve + Four Days In May
- Jinn
- The Feeling of Being Watched
- Happy Birthday, Marsha!

=== 2019 ===
- When I Get Home
- Hip Hop: The Songs That Shook America
- Sprinter
- Jezebel
- A Love Song for Latasha

=== 2020 ===
- Miss Juneteenth
- Coded Bias
- Farewell Amor
- Through The Night
- Stateless
- Down a Dark Stairwell

=== 2021 ===
- The Inheritance
- Writing with Fire
- Beans

=== 2022 ===
- Aftershock
- Mars One
- Lingui, The Sacred Bonds

=== 2023 ===
- Going to Mars: The Nikki Giovanni Project
- Girl
- Spirit Emulsion

=== 2024 ===
- The Ballad of Suzanne Césaire
- The Queen of My Dreams
- Dreams in Nightmares
- Bye Bye Tiberias

=== 2025 ===
- BLKNWS: Terms & Conditions
- Move Ya Body: The Birth of House
- Love, Brooklyn
- All That's Left of You
