= Gotham Independent Film Award for Breakthrough Series – Short Form =

Former annual US film award

- Country: United States
- Presented by: The Gotham Film & Media Institute
- First award: 2015
- Currently held by: Beef (2023)
- Website: awards.thegotham.org

The Gotham Independent Film Award for Breakthrough Series – Short Form is one of the annual Gotham Independent Film Awards and honors series with episodes under 40 minutes. Until 2019, the award intended to honor a new continuing or limited series new digital media programming, with five or more episodes mostly under 20 minutes. It was first awarded in 2015.

== Winners and nominees ==
=== 2010s ===
Year	Program	Creator(s)/Host(s)	Network	Ref.
2015	Shugs and Fats	Nadia Manzoor and Radhika Vaz, creators	ShugsandFats.TV	
2015	Bee and PuppyCat	Natasha Allegri, creator	Cartoon Hangover	
2015	The Impossibilities	Anna Kerrigan, creator	seriesofimpossibilities.com	
2015	Qraftish	Christal, creator	Blackgirldangerous.com	
2015	You're So Talented	Sam Bailey, creator	Open TV	
2016	Her Story	Jen Richards and Laura Zak, creators	herstoryshow.com	
2016	The Gay and Wondrous Life of Caleb Gallo	Brian Jordan Alvarez, creator	YouTube	
2016	The Movement	Darnell Moore, host	Mic.com	
2016	Sitting in Bathrooms with Trans People	Dylan Marron, creator	Seriously.TV	
2016	Surviving	Reagan Gomez, creator	YouTube	
2017	The Strange Eyes of Dr. Myes	Nancy Andrews, creator	YouTube	
2017	555	Kate Berlant, Andrew DeYoung and John Early, creators	Vimeo	
2017	Inconceivable	Joel Ashton McCarthy, creator	YouTube	
2017	Junior	Zoe Cassavetes, creator	Blackpills and VICE	
2017	Let Me Die a Nun	Sarah Salovaara, creator	Vimeo	
2018	195 Lewis	Chanelle Aponte Pearson and Rae Leone Allen, creators	195lewis.com	
2018	Cleaner Daze	Tess Sweet and Daniel Gambelin, creators	cleanerdaze.com	
2018	Distance	Alex Dobrenko, creator	distancetheseries.com	
2018	The F Word	Nicole Opper, creator	PBS Digital Studios	
2018	She's the Ticket	Nadia Hallgren, creator	Topic	
2019	PEN15	Maya Erskine, Anna Konkle, and Sam Zvibleman, creators	Hulu	
2019	Ramy	Ramy Youssef, Ari Katcher, and Ryan Welch, creators	Hulu	
2019	Russian Doll	Natasha Lyonne, Leslye Headland, and Amy Poehler, creators	Netflix	
2019	Tuca & Bertie	Lisa Hanawalt, creator	Netflix	
2019	Undone	Raphael Bob-Waksberg and Kate Purdy, creators	Amazon Video	

=== 2020s ===
Year	Program	Creator(s)/Host(s)	Network	Ref.
2020	I May Destroy You	Michaela Coel, creator	HBO	
2020	Dave	Lil Dicky and Jeff Schaffer, creators	FX	
2020	Betty	Crystal Moselle, creator	HBO	
2020	Taste the Nation with Padma Lakshmi	Padma Lakshmi, host	Hulu	
2020	Work in Progress	Abby McEnany and Tim Mason, creators	Showtime	
2021	Reservation Dogs	Sterlin Harjo and Taika Waititi, creators	FX	
2021	Blindspotting	Rafael Casal and Daveed Diggs, creators	Starz	
2021	Hacks	Lucia Aniello, Paul W. Downs, and Jen Statsky, creators	HBO Max	
2021	Run the World	Leigh Davenport, creator	Starz	
2021	We Are Lady Parts	Nida Manzoor, creator	Peacock	
2022	Mo	Mohammed Amer and Ramy Youssef, creators	Netflix	
2022	Abbott Elementary	Quinta Brunson, creator	ABC	
2022	As We See It	Jason Katims, creator	Prime Video	
2022	Rap Sh!t	Issa Rae, creator	HBO/HBO Max	
2022	Somebody Somewhere	Hannah Bos and Paul Thureen, creators	HBO Max	
2023	Beef	Lee Sung Jin, creator	Netflix	
2023	High School	Clea DuVall and Tegan and Sara Quin, creators	Amazon Freevee	
2023	I'm a Virgo	Boots Riley, creator	Prime Video	
2023	Rain Dogs	Cash Carraway, creator	HBO	
2023	Swarm	Donald Glover and Janine Nabers, creators	Prime Video	
