= Nuotama Bodomo =

Ghanaian filmmaker (born 1988)

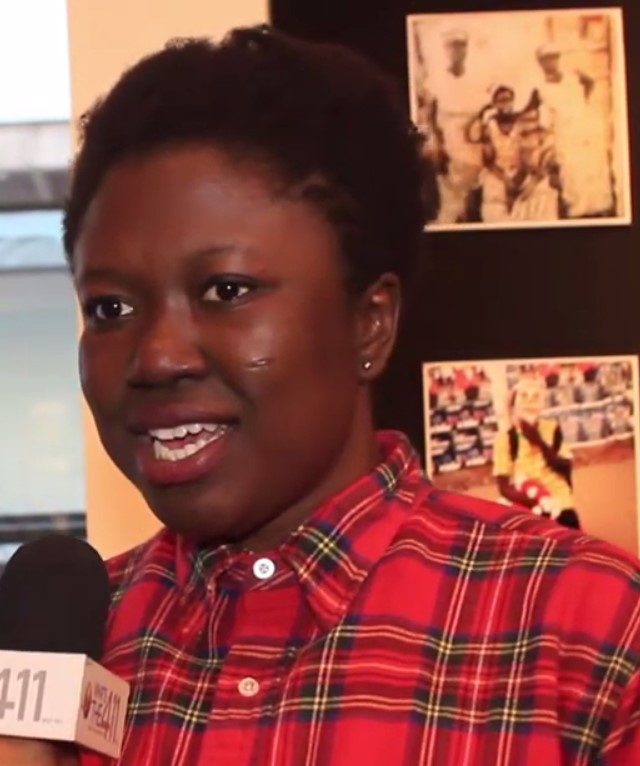
- Bodomo at the 20th Anniversary of the New York African Film Festival in 2018
- Born: Nuotama Frances Bodomo; 1988 (age 37–38); Ghana
- Education: Columbia University (BA); Tisch School of the Arts (MFA)
- Known for: Random Acts of Flyness (2018), Collective: Unconscious (2016), Boneshaker (2013) and Afronauts (2014)
- Movement: Afrofuturist filmmakers
- Website: https://nuotamabodomo.info/

Nuotama Frances Bodomo (born 1988) is a Ghanaian filmmaker, writer and director.

== Biography and career ==
Born in Ghana, to parents who are both educators, Bodomo is Dagaaba. She was also raised in Norway and Hong Kong, before moving to New York to study film at Columbia University, graduating with a BA in 2010, and NYU's Tisch Film School (MFA). Her first film, Boneshaker (2013), starring Oscar nominee Quvenzhané Wallis, premiered at the 2013 Sundance Film Festival before playing at SXSW, Pan African Film Festival, and Lincoln Center's African Film Festival. Her film Afronauts (2014), inspired by the Zambian project of Edward Makuka Nkoloso, had its US premiere at the 2014 Sundance Film Festival, its international premiere at the 2014 Berlin International Film Festival, and was included in the exhibition "Dreamlands: Immersive Cinema and Art, 1905–2016" at the Whitney Museum of American Art.

She was named one of Filmmaker magazine's "25 New Faces in Independent Film" in 2014. She is based in New York City.

She directed the short segment "Everybody Dies!" for the omnibus feature Collective: Unconscious (2016), which premiered at the 2016 SXSW Film Festival. It won Best Experimental Short at the 2016 BlackStar Film Festival. In Film Quarterly, Vol. 71, Number 2, in a Black Film dossier titled "Death Grips," by Michael Boyce Gillespie, Bodomo explains her 2016 film segment Everybody Dies!. In 2018, Bodomo was a writer and director on Random Acts of Flyness, an HBO series created by Terence Nance.

Bodomo is currently developing the feature version of Afronauts, which is supported by the Sundance Institute, Tribeca Film Institute, the Hubert Bals Fund of International Film Festival Rotterdam, IFP's Emerging Storytellers program, and the Alfred P Sloan Foundation.

Bodomo is a 2019 United States Artists (USA) Fellow in Film.

== Filmography ==
- Boneshaker (2013)
- Afronauts (2014)
- Collective: Unconscious (segment "Everybody Dies!") (2016)
- Random Acts of Flyness: Season 1 (2018)

== See also ==
- Black Women Filmmakers
- Ghanaian Women Filmmakers
- Ghanaian Filmmakers
