= Showrunner =

Top-level producer of a television show

A showrunner is the top-level executive producer of a television series. The position outranks other creative and management personnel, including episode directors, in contrast to feature films, in which the director has creative control over the production, and the executive producer's role is limited to investing. In scripted comedy and drama TV shows, the showrunner also usually serves as the head writer (or its most prolific writer). The role of a showrunner is not present on all television series, especially outside the United States; this article describes the nature of the role where it is present.

== United States ==
Writer Alex Epstein, in his book and blog Crafty Screenwriting, defines a showrunner as follows:

"The person responsible for all creative aspects of the show and responsible only to the network (and production company, if it's not [their] production company). The boss. Usually a writer. Traditionally, the executive producer of a television program was the chief executive, responsible for the show's creative direction and production. Over time, the title of executive producer was applied to a wider range of roles—from a senior writer, to someone who arranges financing, to an "angel" who holds the title as an honorific with no management duties in return for providing backing capital. The term showrunner was created to identify the executive producer who holds ultimate management and creative authority for the program."

The contract gained by the Writers Guild of America in the 2023 strike now explicitly defines "showrunner" as writers and people responsible for making hiring decisions regarding a project's other staff writers.

In a January 1990 submission to the United States Congress House Committee on the Judiciary Subcommittee on Courts, Intellectual Property, and the Administration of Justice, Barney Rosenzweig (Executive Vice President and Chairman, Television Division of Weintraub Entertainment Group) wrote:

In the early days of Hollywood, no one questioned what Producer David O. Selznick was to Gone with the Wind, or Pandro Berman to all those Fred Astaire and Ginger Rogers films, or Walt Disney to his early work, or Arthur Freed to the MGM musical. They were the producers... the storytellers. Today in television, the producer is still that person: the show-runner. Television is a producer's medium. Ask the people who make and stand behind their shows – from Aaron Spelling to Stephen Cannell, Stephen Bochco, Len Hill, Edgar Scherick or Phil de Guerre [Philip DeGuere Jr.]. The definition of who does what in television today is not that different from what it was generally in Hollywood before a few critics in France coined the term 'auteur' and the Writer's Guild took the producers, their traditional nemesis, to court – thus all but destroying the Producer's Guild and giving leave for the studios themselves to usurp the name producer.

Los Angeles Times columnist Scott Collins describes showrunners as:

"Hyphenates", a curious hybrid of starry-eyed artists and tough-as-nails operational managers. They're not just writers; they're not just producers. They hire and fire writers and crew members, develop story lines, write scripts, cast actors, mind budgets and run interference with studio and network bosses. It's one of the most unusual and demanding, right-brain/left-brain job descriptions in the entertainment world....[S]howrunners make – and often create – the show and now more than ever, shows are the only things that matter. In the "long tail" entertainment economy, viewers don't watch networks. They don't even care about networks. They watch shows. And they don't care how they get them.

In a 2011 article in The Australian, Shane Brennan, the showrunner for NCIS and NCIS: Los Angeles, described the position thus:

He explains the moniker was created to identify the producer who actually held ultimate management and creative authority for the program, given the way the honorific 'executive producer' was applied to a wider range of roles. There's also the fact that anyone with any power wanted a producer's credit, including the leading actors, who often did no more than say the writers' lines. "It had got to the stage where it was incredibly confusing; there were so many production credits no one knew who was responsible," he says.

In June 2023, Andy Greenwald of Briarpatch said of the title of showrunner, "It's a made-up title, and it's not a paid position". Without an overall deal, he said, a showrunner could be paid less than a co-executive producer "because everything else that I do — from hiring the writers, to being on set and producing, to being in post for months, then doing press — is not compensated". With the end of the streaming wars and Hollywood emphasizing profitability, overall deals became much rarer. Reduced compensation for showrunners and others in the writers' room helped cause the 2023 Writers Guild of America strike. In an interview that same month with Vox, writer Erica Saleh, who developed the series One of Us Is Lying, listed the function and structure of the personnel in WGA writers' rooms, explaining that showrunners determine the tone and genre of the show, and break down the structure of a season, its episodes, and storylines, prior to actual production of the program. Saleh listed the hierarchy of the staff on WGA shows, in order of authority:

Level	Position	Notes
1.	Showrunner	The showrunner is the highest authority in charge of the production of a television show.
2.	Executive producer	The executive producer has been likened to the CEO of a series. The executive producer is often the creator of a series, and sometimes serves as the showrunner as well. They help write scripts, and run day-to-day production operations, overseeing production of a story from script to screen. The precise functions of an executive producer can vary, depending on multiple factors. In some cases, the title is used to credit a writer who had signed off on a series, but had little involvement with its production.
3.	Co-executive producer	Co-executive producers have been analogized to an executive producers's "first mate", the selection of which is solely the responsibility of the executive producer. They are usually the most senior writer on the staff, or "Head Writer", and therefore the dominant voice in the writers' room, who assist the showrunner by spearheading the management of the scripts. They also assist the showrunner in production, and oversee the writers. The co-executive producer's duties typically include liaising between executives and staff, making design and directorial decisions, running the production when the Executive Producer is not present, and assisting with such daily activities as financing, staffing, scheduling, and other operations.
4.	Supervising producer	Supervising producers help oversee a show's daily creative direction, overseeing other producers and members of the production staff with administrative and creative duties. These include hiring episode directors, overseeing the writers' room, assisting with script rewrites, and training new writers. Supervising producers are required to have several years of production experience.
5.	Producer	Producers coordinate and supervise all aspects of TV production, in both creative and administrative capacities, including making financial decisions, and handling contracts, talent, and bargaining agreements. They also address problems that arise during production, and make sure that it does not exceed its budget. Their duties include fundraising and networking, soliciting and assessing scripts and project ideas, hiring writers, and securing rights to other intellectual properties.
6.	Co-producer	
7.	Executive story editor	
8.	Story editor	
9.	Staff writer	According to Saleh, this position, the lowest level in the writers' room, is the one in which new writers are usually placed when they obtain their first job writing on a television show.

== Canada ==
The Writers Guild of Canada, the union representing screenwriters in Canada, established the Showrunner Award in 2007, at the annual Canadian Screenwriting Awards. The first Showrunner Award was presented in April 2007 to Brad Wright, executive producer of Stargate Atlantis and Stargate SG-1.

== United Kingdom ==
In the first decade of the 21st century, the concept of a showrunner, specifically interpreted as a writer or presenter with overall responsibility for a television production, began to spread to the British television industry. "Nonetheless, the showrunner production model is still less common in drama production in the UK" than it is in the U.S., scholars Ruth McElroy and Caitriona Noonan wrote in 2019.

The first British comedy series to use the term was My Family (2000–11), which had several showrunners in succession. Initially, the show was overseen by creator Fred Barron from series 1–4. Ian Brown and James Hendrie took over for series 5, followed by American writer Tom Leopold for series 6. Former Cheers showrunner Tom Anderson was in charge from series 7 to the final series, series 11.

The first writer appointed the role of showrunner on a British primetime drama was Tony McHale, writer and creator of Holby City, in 2005. Jed Mercurio had carried out a similar role on the less conspicuous medical drama Bodies (2004–2006). But Russell T Davies' work on the 2005 revival of Doctor Who brought the term to prominence in British television (to the extent that in 2009 a writer for The Guardian wrote that "Over here, the concept of 'showrunner' has only made it as far as Doctor Who").

In an interview, Davies said that he felt the role of the showrunner was to establish and maintain a consistent tone in a drama. Doctor Who remains the most prominent example of a British television programme with a showrunner, with Steven Moffat having taken over the post from Davies from 2010 until 2017. Chris Chibnall later took over from Moffat. Davies returned, following Chibnall's departure. The term has also been used to refer to other writer-producers, such as Cash Carraway on Rain Dogs, Tony Jordan on Moving Wallpaper and Echo Beach, Ann McManus on Waterloo Road, Adrian Hodges on Primeval and Jed Mercurio on Bodies, Line of Duty, and Critical.

== See also ==
- Television program creator
- Television producer
- Television crew (including Runner, a junior role not to be confused with Showrunner)
- Screenwriter
- Television director
- Producer (radio)
- News director
