= Naima Ramos-Chapman =

American filmmaker

- Born: Brooklyn, New York
- Occupations: director, writer, actress
- Notable work: And Nothing Happened

Naima Ramos-Chapman is an American director, writer, and actress. She directed two short films that deal with gender-based violence, And Nothing Happened in 2016, and Piu Piu in 2018.

== Life and career ==
Ramos-Chapman was raised in Flatbush, Brooklyn. She is of Puerto Rican and Black descent. She studied dance from childhood and attended the Alvin Ailey School for Dance. Ramos-Chapman graduated from Brooklyn College.

The first film Ramos-Chapman wrote and directed was the 2016 short And Nothing Happened. She used Kickstarter and worked several jobs to finance the film. The film, which she stars in, was inspired by her trauma in the aftermath of a sexual assault. She stated in an interview with Essence, "It is not only a thing one person survives–sexual assault is something a whole family, community, nation survives and until we understand that we cannot truly confront it. That is why I made And Nothing Happened." In 2018, Ramos-Chapman wrote and directed Piu Piu, a "psycho surrealist" short that premiered at the 2018 BlackStar Film Festival. Piu Piu is loosely based on an experience Ramos-Chapman had been stalked by a stranger in public.

Ramos-Chapman is a writer, director, and actor for HBO's Random Acts of Flyness. She also edits and does production work for the series.

On July 24, 2019, it was announced that Ramos-Chapman was slated to direct a Showtime series called How to Make Love to a Black Woman (Who May Be Working Through Some Sh*t), executive produced by Lena Waithe and written by Casallina “Cathy” Kisakye. In February 2020, it was announced that Showtime would no longer move forward with the pilot.

In 2021, Ramos-Chapman was named a United States Artists (USA) Fellow.

== Personal life ==
She was in a relationship with Terence Nance, whom she met while interviewing him for Saint Heron, the creative agency owned by Solange Knowles.
