= Gotham Independent Film Awards 2015 =

Independent award show

25th Annual Gotham Independent Film Awards
- Date: November 30, 2015
- Country: United States
- Presented by: Independent Filmmaker Project
- Hosted by: Abbi Jacobson and Ilana Glazer

Highlights
- Most wins: Spotlight and Tangerine (2)
- Most nominations: The Diary of a Teenage Girl (5)
- Best Feature: Spotlight
- Breakthrough Director: Jonas Carpignano – Mediterranea
- Website: https://gotham.ifp.org

The 25th Annual Gotham Independent Film Awards, presented by the Independent Filmmaker Project, were held on November 30, 2015. The nominees were announced on October 22, 2015. The ceremony was hosted by Abbi Jacobson and Ilana Glazer.

== Winners and nominees ==
=== Film ===
Best Feature: Spotlight; Carol; The Diary of a Teenage Girl; Heaven Knows What; Tangerine	Best Documentary Feature: The Look of Silence; Approaching the Elephant; Cartel Land; Heart of a Dog; Listen to Me Marlon
Breakthrough Director: Jonas Carpignano – Mediterranea; Desiree Akhavan – Appropriate Behavior; Marielle Heller – The Diary of a Teenage Girl; John Magary – The Mend; Josh Mond – James White	Breakthrough Actor: Mya Taylor – Tangerine as Alexandra; Rory Culkin – Gabriel as Gabriel; Arielle Holmes – Heaven Knows What as Harley; Lola Kirke – Mistress America as Tracy Fishko; Kitana Kiki Rodriguez – Tangerine as Sin-Dee Rella
Best Actor: Paul Dano – Love & Mercy as Brian Wilson; Christopher Abbott – James White as James White; Kevin Corrigan – Results as Danny Flynn; Peter Sarsgaard – Experimenter as Stanley Milgram; Michael Shannon – 99 Homes as Rick Carver	Best Actress: Bel Powley – The Diary of a Teenage Girl as Minnie Goetze; Cate Blanchett – Carol as Carol Aird; Blythe Danner – I'll See You in My Dreams as Carol Petersen; Brie Larson – Room as Joy "Ma" Newsome; Lily Tomlin – Grandma as Elle Reid; Kristen Wiig – Welcome to Me as Alice Klieg
Best Screenplay: Tom McCarthy and Josh Singer – Spotlight; Noah Baumbach – While We're Young; Marielle Heller – The Diary of a Teenage Girl; Michael Alan Lerner and Oren Moverman – Love & Mercy; Phyllis Nagy – Carol	Audience Award: Tangerine; Approaching the Elephant; Appropriate Behavior; Carol; Cartel Land; The Diary of a Teenage Girl; Heart of a Dog; Heaven Knows What; Listen to Me Marlon; The Look of Silence; The Mend; Mediterranea; Spotlight; James White

=== Television ===
Breakthrough Series – Long Form: Mr. Robot; Jane the Virgin; Transparent; Unbreakable Kimmy Schmidt; UnREAL	Breakthrough Series – Short Form: Shugs and Fats; Bee and PuppyCat; The Impossibilities; Qraftish; You're So Talented

== Special awards ==
=== Special Jury Award – Ensemble Performance ===
- Spotlight – Mark Ruffalo, Michael Keaton, Rachel McAdams, John Slattery, Stanley Tucci, Brian d'Arcy James, Liev Schreiber, and Billy Crudup

=== Spotlight on Women Filmmakers "Live the Dream" Grant ===
- Chanelle Aponte Pearson – 195 Lewis
  - Claire Carré – Embers
  - Deb Shoval – AWOL

=== Gotham Appreciation Award ===
- Ellen Cotter of Angelika Film Center Theaters

=== Gotham Tributes ===
- Steve Golin
- Todd Haynes
- Helen Mirren
- Robert Redford
