= 195 Lewis =

American web series

- Title screen
- Genre: comedy drama
- Created by: Rae Leone Allen & Yaani Supreme
- Developed by: MVMT
- Written by: Rae Leone Allen; Yaani Supreme; Chanelle Aponte Pearson; Terence Nance
- Directed by: Chanelle Aponte Pearson
- Starring: Rae Leone Allen; Sirita Wright; Roxie Johnson; D. Ajane Carlton; Trae Harris
- Country of origin: United States
- Original language: English
- No. of seasons: 1
- No. of episodes: 5

Production
- Executive producers: Chanelle Aponte Pearson & Terence Nance
- Cinematography: Jomo Fray
- Editor: Jon Proctor
- Production company: MVMT

Original release
- Release: November 16, 2017

195 Lewis (pronounced One Nine Five Lewis) is an American comedy-drama web series created by Rae Leone Allen and Yaani Supreme, and co-written with Terence Nance and director Chanelle Aponte Pearson. It follows several Black queer women (played by Allen, Sirita Wright, Roxie Johnson, and D. Ajane Carlton) living in Bedford–Stuyvesant, Brooklyn (Bed-Stuy). The series was released online on its website, One Nine Five Lewis, on November 16, 2017. It received the 2018 Gotham Award for Breakthrough Series and a Special Mention at Outfest 2017.

== Plot ==
195 Lewis centers on a close-knit group of Black queer women navigating relationships in Bed-Stuy, Brooklyn. The series features topics such as sex positivity and polyamory.

== Cast and characters ==
- Rae Leone Allen as Yuri, an artist and Camille's girlfriend
- Sirita Wright as Camille, Yuri's girlfriend who recently completed her PhD
- Roxie Johnson as Kris, a recent transplant from Texas and Yuri's former college girlfriend
- D. Ajane Carlton as Stacy-Anne, a womanizer and Camille's younger sister
- Trae Harris as Harlem, Yuri's love interest

== Production ==
Yaani Lewis and Rae Leone Allen created and wrote the initial script for 195 Lewis. The series reflects Lewis and Allen's experiences as Black queer women living in Brooklyn. The title refers to the address where they lived at the time with the street name changed.

In 2014, they approached Terence Nance's production company, MVMT, about the project and his business partner Chanelle Aponte Pearson requested to work on it. Pearson received the Gotham Awards’ "Spotlight on Women Filmmakers Live The Dream" grant to further develop the series. It is her directorial debut. Allen stated that they had difficulty garnering interest in the project, and most of the crew and actors had little experience in television and film production.

Co-stars Allen and Wright in the premiere episode. The producers intentionally used bright lighting throughout the series.

Nance and Pearson co-wrote and developed the script, and Jomo Fray was the director of photography. Filming was on-location in Bed-Stuy. Fray's cinematography frequently featured "bright, neon, and stylized" lighting.

== Release and reception ==
The pilot premiered at the BlackStar Film Festival in 2014. It was later re-shot and the full five episodes of the series premiered on its website on November 16, 2017.

195 Lewis received positive reception. In a review for IndieWire Jude Dry wrote, "Director Chanelle Aponte Pearson makes a confident and splashy debut, catapulting her considerable producing skills to a new level." Writing for Vice, Emily J. Smith stated, "While 195 intentionally tackles complex subjects like polyamory, sex positivity, and misogyny in lesbian culture, it's not in the way you might expect. The cast of characters allows for conflicting perspectives—even in this very specific world—so viewers are invited into a real conversation instead of a lecture."

== Awards and nominations ==
- 2017 – Outfest, U.S. Narrative Special Mention
- 2017 – BlackStar Film Festival, Audience Award for Favorite Narrative Feature
- 2018 – Gotham Award, Breakthrough Series – Short Form
