= Diandra Forrest =

American fashion model (born 1989)

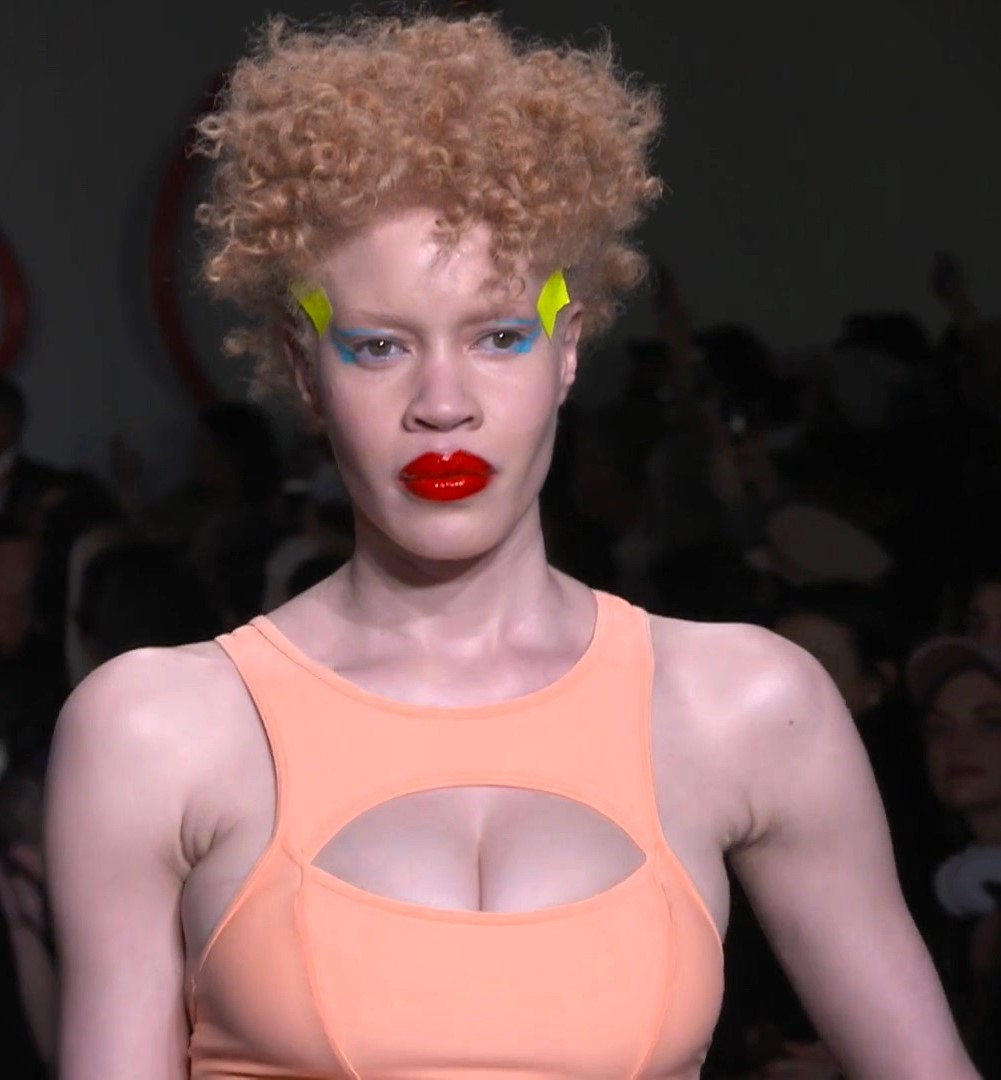
- Forrest modeling for Chromat Autumn/Winter 2018
- Born: October 22, 1989 (age 37); The Bronx, New York, US
- Known for: Model, actress, albinism activist
- Children: 2
- Modeling information
- Height: 5 ft 11 in (180 cm)
- Hair color: Blonde
- Eye color: Green

Diandra Forrest (born October 22, 1989) is an African American fashion model and actress with albinism. She grew up in the Bronx, New York City, in a Black community where she was bullied for her white skin, until she moved to a private school to avoid it. After graduation, Forrest became the first female model with albinism signed to a major modelling agency, and the first to be featured in a national campaign for a major brand. She has starred in several short films and appeared in multiple widely released music videos. Forrest uses her prominence to advocate for people with albinism around the world.

== Early life ==
Forrest was born on October 22, 1989, to African American parents, and grew up in the Black community of the Bronx, the northernmost borough of New York City. She was one of five children, of whom only she and her younger brother have albinism. She lacks melanin, giving her white skin, blonde hair, and green eyes, with the classical African full lips and wide nose. She also has nystagmus, a condition where her eyes move back and forth.

Forrest realized she had albinism at the age of nine. She remembers being regularly made fun of for her pale skin and hair, by children and even adults, to the point of tears. She changed schools many times until eventually enrolling in the New York Institute for Special Education, where her sixth-grade teacher, also an African American woman with albinism, encouraged her. With that added confidence, by the age of fourteen, she decided to become a model. She says she spoke with a modeling coach when she was fourteen or fifteen, but he told her that she would never be a model because she was too odd. Forrest graduated NYISE in 2007, and wrote in the class yearbook that in ten years she saw herself "walking the runway of a Victoria's Secret fashion show".

== Modeling ==
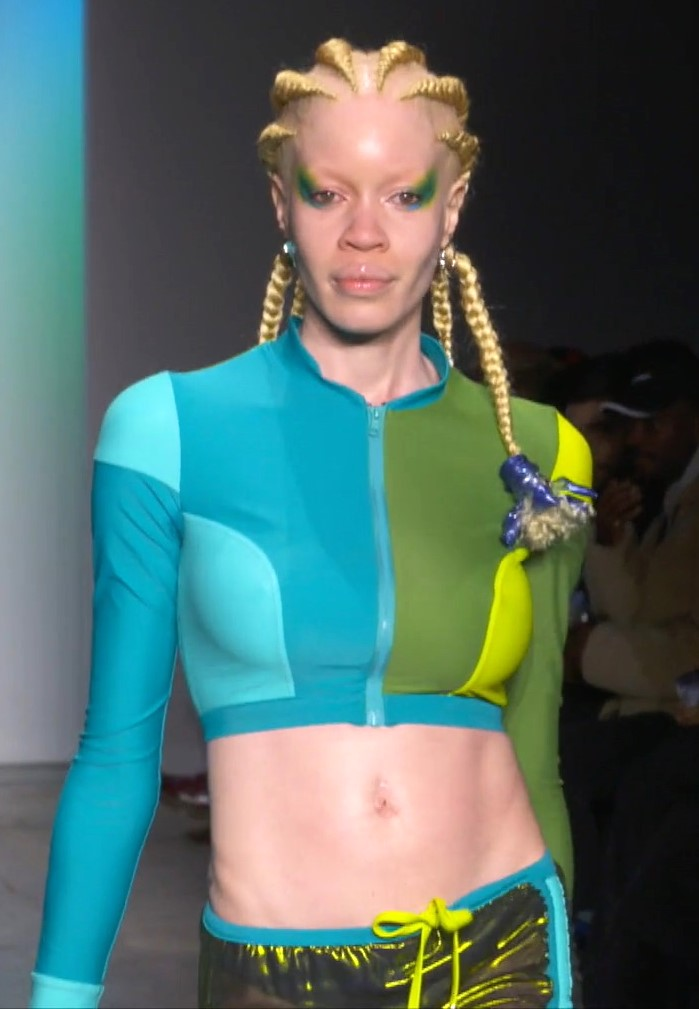
Forrest walks for Chromat Autumn/Winter 2019

Forrest was noticed by fashion photographer Shameer Khan while walking down 34th Street in New York, and signed with Elite Model Management a month later in February 2009. She says her coach was wrong, the agency signed her immediately, and clients were interested. It was the first time a female model with albinism had signed with a major agency. In the summer of 2009, she left the United States for her first time, to model at Paris Fashion Week. In May 2015, Forrest was the face of designer Mimi Plange's fall collection. That September, she shared the cover of Ebony magazine. In May 2016, she told her story in advertising for Burt's Bees.

In October 2017, Forrest became one of five atypical models to be featured in the Wet n Wild cosmetics "Breaking Beauty" campaign (along with Asian-American musician Michelle Zauner, Olympic weightlifter Briana Marquez, amputee activist Mama Cax, and Dutch transgender model Valentijn de Hingh). This made her the first model with albinism to front a national campaign for a major beauty brand. Forrest said that besides the groundbreaking aspect, she valued that the cosmetics brand made shades that worked on her skin.

== Albinism advocacy ==
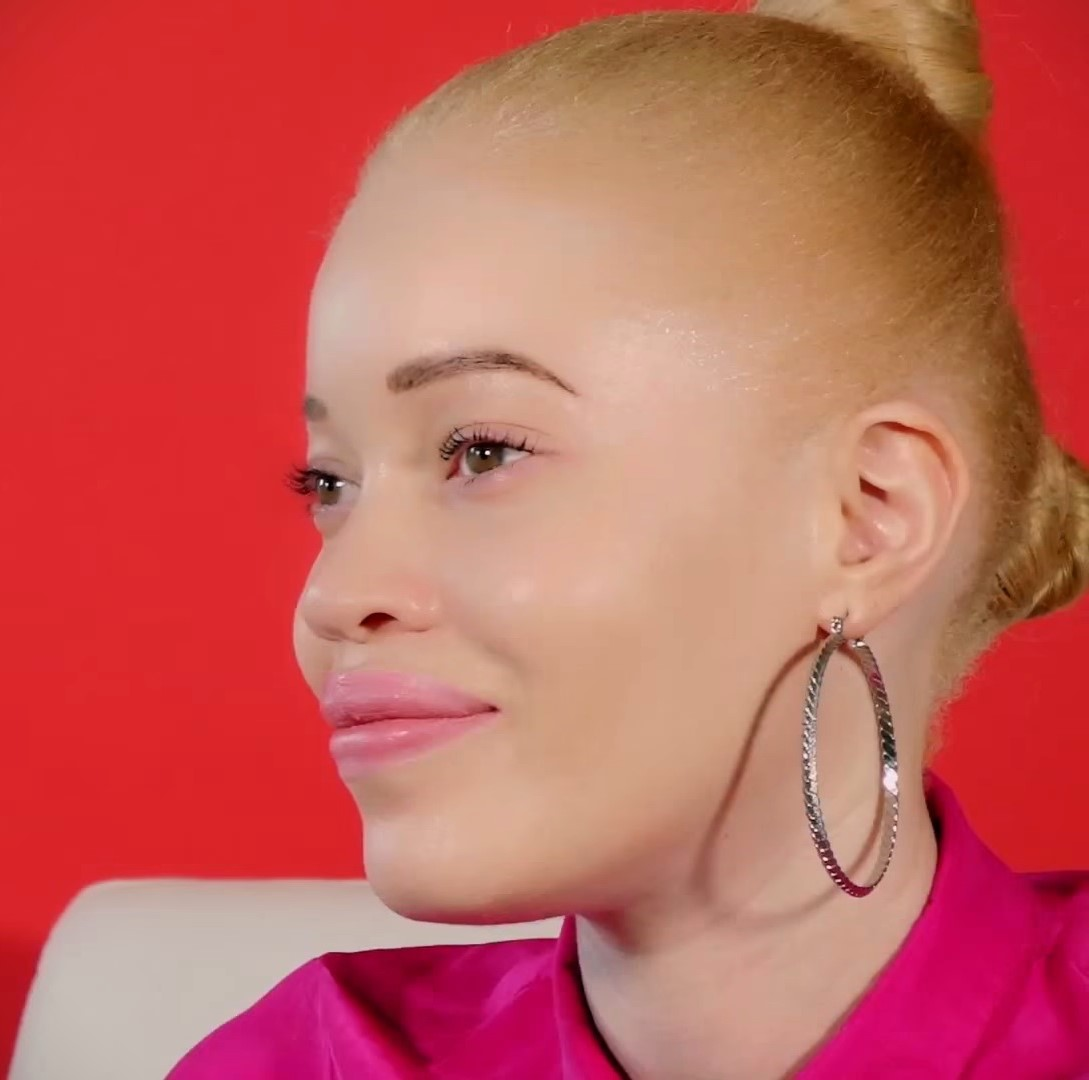
Forrest interviewed in 2015

Several years into her career, Forrest was shocked to learn about the persecution of people with albinism, far greater than the teasing and bullying she faced growing up. Throughout the world, the occurrence of albinism is close to 1 in 20,000 people, but in Tanzania, where the proportion is closer to 1 in 1400, and other countries in Sub-Saharan Africa and East Africa, people with albinism are at risk of being killed or dismembered, their bodies used as magical charms.

In October 2012, Forrest attended Africa Fashion Week in Johannesburg, South Africa, partly to try to change the way albino people are viewed on that continent. In 2015 she was working with Assisting Children in Need, a group which opened a safe house for children with albinism in Tanzania.

In the summer of 2016, Forrest appeared in and directed a short film for the "Beyond My Skin" campaign, meant to celebrate albinism. It premiered on International Albinism Awareness Day, and profits went to the Salif Keïta Global Foundation for people with albinism. In May 2019, following the murder of a child with albinism, Forrest flew to Mali to dance a benefit concert with Salif Keïta, a Malian musician who also has albinism. Coumba Makalou, Keïta's wife, who heads the foundation, said Forrest was an inspiration to many girls with albinism, and seeing her could be life changing. In 2019, Forrest appeared as a spokesperson for NYDG ColorFull, a partnership between the New York Dermatology Foundation and the United Nations to support people with albinism.

== Acting ==
In 2013, Forrest starred in the short film Sololoque by Ruben Sznajderman, which aired at the ASVOFF festival. The following year, Forrest starred in Afronauts, a speculative science fiction short film by Nuotama Bodomo about a 1960s Zambian woman attempting to beat the US and USSR to the moon. In 2022, Forrest starred in War of Colors, a short film by Emir Kumova about discrimination faced by African Americans with albinism.

In August 2010, Forrest appeared in the music video for Kanye West's song "Power", ending with her swinging at the singer with a sword. In December 2013, Forrest appeared in two music videos for Beyoncé: in "Pretty Hurts" she plays a beauty contest competitor, and in "XO" she rides along on a roller coaster. In 2016, Forrest danced in the music video for "Pleasure Toy" by Bilal.

== Children ==
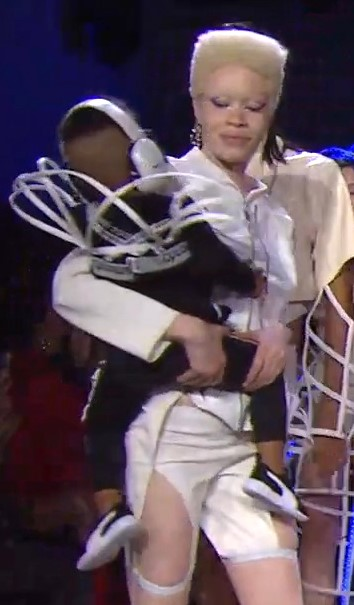
Forrest with son at Chromat Spring/Summer 2020

Forrest has a daughter, born 2015, and a son, born 2017. In February 2016, Forrest was the target of controversy when she walked the runway at a Gypsy Sport fashion show at New York Fashion Week. She was holding her seven-week-old daughter close to her chest in a blanket, and some (including The Daily Beast) assumed she was breastfeeding in public, although she was not. A year later, Forrest posted a photo of her actually breastfeeding her daughter during a fashion shoot, and called back to that moment.
