= Chicken & Egg Films =

American film production company

- Industry: Film industry
- Founded: 2005
- Founder: Julie Parker Benello; Judith Helfand; Wendy Ettinger
- Headquarters: New York City; San Francisco
- Website: chickeneggpics.org

Chicken & Egg Films is a US based film organization that supports women and gender-nonconforming nonfiction filmmakers whose artful and innovative storytelling catalyzes social change. Chicken & Egg Films was founded in 2005 by Julie Parker Benello, Judith Helfand and Wendy Ettinger. Since 2013, Chicken & Egg Films has been led by CEO Jenni Wolfson.Since its founding, Chicken & Egg Films has awarded $14M in grants to women and gender expansvie filmmakers.

They have produced such films as The Oath (2010), The Invisible War (2012), The Square (2013), Whose Streets? (2017), The Feeling of Being Watched (2018), One Child Nation (2019), Coded Bias (2020), and Ascension (2021).

== History ==
In 2005, Julie Parker Benello, Judith Helfand, and Wendy Ettinger launched Chicken and Egg Pictures, a film production and television production company focused on producing documentary film and television projects focusing on social issues directed by women. The organization offers grants to women and gender non-conforming filmmakers worldwide, with the grants being offered to various phases of production, including filming, post-production, and distribution. The organization offers a lab to first or second time filmmakers called the (Egg)celerator Lab, offering $35k towards production on their documentary feature.

In October 2024, the company re-branded to Chicken & Egg Films.
