= Tanya Moodie =

Canadian-born British actress

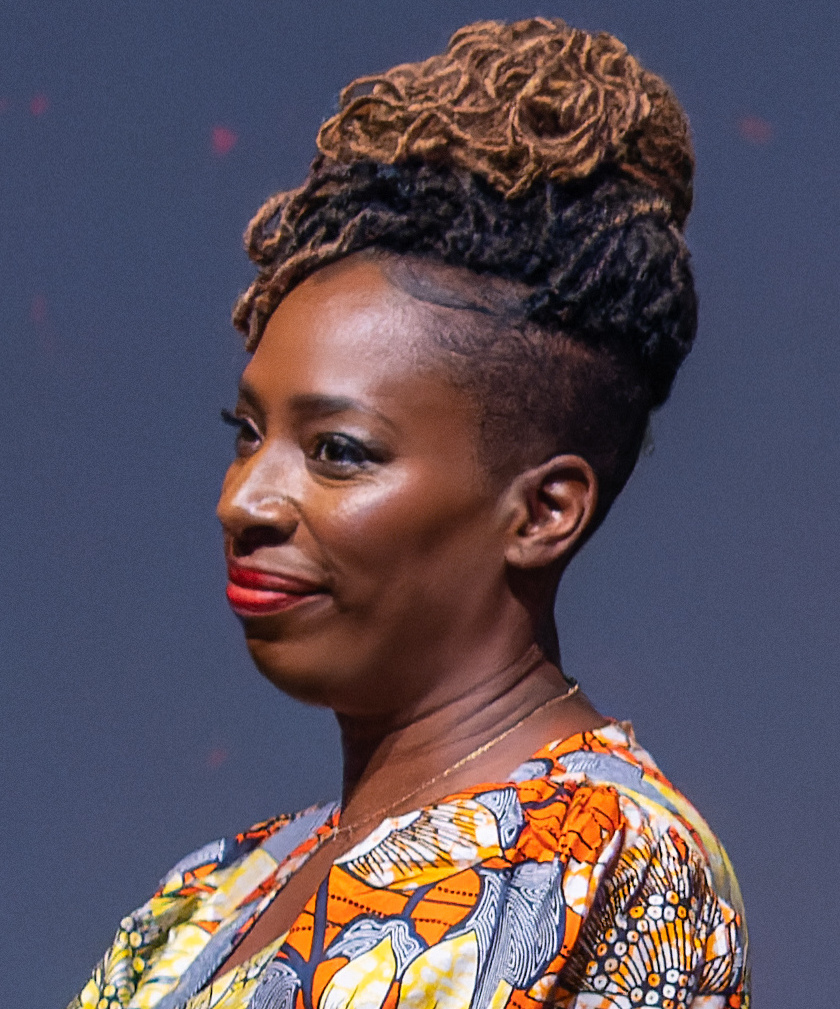
- Moodie in 2022
- Born: Quebec, Canada
- Education: Royal Academy of Dramatic Art
- Occupations: Actor, producer
- Years active: 1994–present
- Children: 1

Tanya Moodie is a British-Canadian actor and producer, best known for her work on the television series Motherland and Silo, in addition to her many stage credits, which include productions with the Royal Shakespeare Company, the Royal National Theatre, the National Theatre, and the Théâtre des Bouffes du Nord.

== Early life and education ==
Tanya Moodie was born in Quebec, Canada, to Jamaican parents.

She moved to England at the age of 17, when she was offered a place at the Royal Academy of Dramatic Art (RADA), where she was later employed as an associate teacher and council member.

== Career ==
Moodie's first television role was in the comedy So Haunt Me in 1994, followed by a starring role as Hunter in Neil Gaiman's 1996 fantasy mini-series Neverwhere (1996). She featured in guest roles in various series in the 2000s, and in 2008–9 had a regular role in Irish medical drama The Clinic. She also played the role of John Watson's therapist Ella Thompson in Sherlock.

In 2016 she played Gertrude in Simon Godwin's production of Hamlet for the Royal Shakespeare Company.

From 2019, Moodie starred as Meg in the BBC television comedy series Motherland. In a 2021 interview with the Huffington Post, Moodie said that she was proud of the feedback she had received about her character's cancer storyline: "There's been people who have written me very personal messages saying that they're going through [cancer] right now or their parents are, and they say we've really shown what it's like. I'm really happy that that's happened – I didn't expect it to. I didn't finish filming and say 'I really feel like I've nailed what it's like to go through this journey', because it's so subjective and unique to people."

In 2019, Moodie was in the BBC Radio 4 audio drama Forest 404.

In 2020, Moodie starred in the third series of Tin Star as Catherine Mckenzie. The series was created by Rowan Joffé.

In April 2022, Moodie featured as Regina in series 1 episode 4 of Ten Percent. Moodie appeared in Sam Mendes' film Empire of Light, released in the US in December 2022, and the UK in January 2023. Moodie appears alongside Olivia Colman, Colin Firth and Micheal Ward. Also in December 2022, Moodie reprised her role as Meg in the Christmas special of Motherland, titled "Last Christmas". The episode garnered wholly positive reviews from critics.

In March 2023, Moodie appeared as Serena in two episodes of the Cash Carraway-created Rain Dogs.

== Personal life ==
Moodie has one child, a daughter, and was married to a yoga teacher before they separated. Her brother Andrew Moodie is a noted Canadian playwright.

Moodie is an art lover, collecting works by Abe Odedina.

Politically, Moodie is a supporter of the Women's Equality Party. She has practised yoga and Buddhism since 1994, and claimed in an interview in 2021, "cut me in half, you'll see Buddhism down the middle".

Moodie is an ambassador for the Park Theatre, London.

== Awards and nominations ==
Moodie was nominated for a 2017 UK Theatre Award for Best Performance for her performance as Wiletta in Trouble in Mind by Alice Childress. Other nominations include Best Actress at the London Evening Standard Theatre Awards, as well as an Olivier Award for Outstanding Achievement in an Affiliate Theatre for her performance as Esther in Intimate Apparel at the Park Theatre. In the same year she was nominated for an Olivier for Outstanding Achievement in an Affiliate Theatre for her performance as Makeda in The House That Will Not Stand at the Tricycle Theatre. Her portrayal of Rose in August Wilson's Fences opposite Lenny Henry in the West End earned her a nomination for Best Actress in the 2014 What's On Stage Awards.

At the 2020 Royal Television Society Programme Awards, Moodie was presented with the Breakthrough Award for her role in Motherland.

== Filmography ==
=== Film ===
Year	Film	Role	Notes
2019	Star Wars: The Rise of Skywalker	General Bellava Parnadee	
2022	Empire of Light	Delia	
2024	Joy	Muriel	
2025	Hostages	Rochelle	
2026	Clayface	Holly	

=== Television ===
Year	Title	Role	Notes
1994	So Haunt Me	Elspeth	4 episodes
1996	Neverwhere	Hunter	Miniseries, 5 episodes
1999	Boyz Unlimited	Carolyn Monroe	2 episodes
1999	Maisie Raine	Patricia	1 episode
1999	Dr Willoughby	Geraldine	1 episode
2000	The Bill	Gina King	1 episode
2000	Always and Everyone	Cassie Jennings	1 episode
2001	High Stakes	Lynsey Hodmore	1 episode
2002; 2010	Holby City	Alice Morgan / Yetunde Bello	2 episodes
2002	The Queen's Nose	Adult Sophie	1 episode
2003	In Deep	Cavendish	2 episodes
2003	Prime Suspect	DC Lorna Greaves	2 episodes
2003	Absolute Power	Isabelle Lux	1 episode
2004	Shane	Drama Teacher	1 episode
2005	Archangel	Velma	Television film
2007	Sea of Souls	Alisha	2 episodes
2007	Silent Witness	DI Helen Lawlor	2 episodes
2008	Casualty	Jeannie	1 episode
2008–2009	The Clinic	Dr. Grace Safete	Main role, 16 episodes
2009	The Street	Maria	1 episode
2010–2017	Sherlock	Ella	3 episodes
2011	The Body Farm	Margot	1 episode
2012	Skins	Layla	1 episode
2012	Lewis	Felicity Prior	1 episode
2014	Playhouse Presents	J-LO	Voice role, 1 episode
2014	Common	Jennifer Fielding	Television film
2014	Dicte	Grace Toulou Aboka	Recurring role, 8 episodes
2017–2020	Absentia	Lt. Diane Campbell	Recurring role, 6 episodes
2018–2022	A Discovery of Witches	Agatha Wilson	Main role, 13 episodes
2018	Enterprice	Sheila	4 episodes
2019	Clink	Merrill Potts	1 episode
2019	The Feed	Sue Cole	Recurring role, 7 episodes
2019	The Mallorca Files	Superintendent Abbey Palmer	4 episodes
2019–2022	Motherland	Meg	13 episodes
2020	Thunderbirds Are Go	Chief Carter	Voice role, 1 episode
2020	Tin Star	Catherine McKenzie	6 episodes
2021	This Time with Alan Partridge	Izzy Barnes	1 episode
2022	The Man Who Fell to Earth	Portia	2 episodes
2022	Ten Percent	Regina	Series 1 episode 4
2022	The Pentaverate	Mrs. Snee	3 episodes
2023	Rain Dogs	Serena	2 episodes
2023	The Change	Joy	5 episodes
2023-2024	Silo	Judge Mary Meadows	6 episodes
2024	The Lord of the Rings: The Rings of Power	Gundabale Earthauler	Recurring role
2025	The Sandman	Night	Episode: "Time and Night"
2025	The Girlfriend	Isabella	Recurring
2026	Good Omens	God	Episode: "The Finale"
