= Yaba =

Yaba or YABA may refer to:

== People ==
Yaba is a female given name associated with the Akan people of West Africa, usually denoting a girl born on a Thursday.

- Yaba Angelosi, South Sudanese American singer, songwriter, sound producer, film director, and entertainer
- Yaba Badoe (born 1954), Ghanaian-British filmmaker, journalist and author
- Yaba Blay (born 1974), Ghanaian-American professor, producer and publisher

== Places ==
- Yaba, Burkina Faso, the capital of Yaba Department
- Yaba, Lagos, a suburb of Lagos, Nigeria
- Yaba, Indonesia, a town in North Maluku, Indonesia
- Yaba, Niger, one of the three villages in the commune

== Other uses ==
- Yaba or Ya ba, tablets of methamphetamine and caffeine popular in south-east Asia
- Yaba monkey tumor virus

== Acronyms ==
- Young American Bowling Alliance, one of the organisations that merged to form the United States Bowling Congress in 2005
- Albany Airport (Western Australia) in Albany, Western Australia
- Yet Another Bloody Acronym, see Acronym § Current use
