= Maori Karmael Holmes =

American filmmaker, curator, and cultural worker (born 1972)

- Born: Los Angeles, California, U.S.A.
- Education: American University (BA), Temple University (MFA)
- Occupations: Filmmaker; Curator; Writer; Non-profit Executive

Maori Karmael Holmes, an American filmmaker, curator, and cultural worker living in Philadelphia, is also the chief executive and artistic officer of BlackStar Projects, which produces the annual BlackStar Film Festival. Holmes founded the festival in 2012.

Holmes directed the 2005 feature documentary Scene Not Heard: Women in Philadelphia Hip-Hop. She has curated several group shows and exhibitions, including Terence Nance: Swarm, which opened in March 2023 at the Institute of Contemporary Art, Philadelphia.

Holmes has contributed to Pleasure Activism: The Politics of Feeling Good (ed. Adrienne Maree Brown); How We Fight White Supremacy: A Field Guide to Black Resistance (ed. by Akiba Solomon and Kenrya Rankin); and Collective Wisdom: Co-Creating Media Within Communities Across Disciplines and Algorithms (by Katerina Cizek, William Uricchio, et al.)

Her interview with Julie Dash was first published in Film Quarterly (Winter 2016) and then anthologized in Julie Dash: Interviews in 2025 (part of the University of Mississippi Press’ long-standing Conversations with Filmmakers series).

Holmes has hosted the podcast Many Lumens since the first episode dropped in December 2020, featuring journalist Dyana Williams.

Holmes holds a BA in history from American University and an MFA in Film from Temple University. In 2023, she received the United States Artists' Berresford Prize and in 2022 received an inaugural Philadelphia's Cultural Treasures Fellowship.
