= Hostages (2025 film) =

British comedy thriller film

- Release poster
- Directed by: Jim Owen
- Screenplay by: Jim Owen
- Produced by: Ben Gallop
- Starring: Charlotte Ritchie; Tanya Moodie; Nicholas Asbury; Raj Ghatak
- Cinematography: Pete Rowe
- Edited by: Owen Oppenheimer
- Music by: James Righton
- Production company: Rawk Pictures
- Distributed by: Signature Entertainment
- Release dates: March 20, 2025 (Manchester); December 22, 2025 (United Kingdom)
- Running time: 90 minutes
- Country: United Kingdom
- Language: English

Hostages is a 2025 British comedy thriller film written and directed by Jim Owen, and starring Charlotte Ritchie, Tanya Moodie, Nicholas Asbury and Raj Ghatak.

The film had its UK premiere at the 2025 Manchester Film Festival. It was released digitally on 22 December 2025.

== Premise ==
After an explosion at a London hotel, three people get caught-up in the prevailing panic. They gain traction on social media and the 24-hour news cycle as rumours spread that the explosion was a terrorist attack.

== Cast ==
- Charlotte Ritchie as Charlie
- Tanya Moodie as Rochelle
- Nicholas Asbury as Keith
- Raj Ghatak as Himmat
- Luke McQueen as Security Guard
- Nick Helm as Gareth
- Alistair Green as Nigel
- Rachel Stubbings as Kathy Woods
- Toby Williams as Alex Potter
- Jack Barry as Plumber
- Georgie Jones as Firefighter
- Simon McCoy as Newsreader

== Production ==
The film marks the feature length directorial debut of Jim Owen. A Rawk Pictures Ltd production, the film is produced by Ben Gallop.

The cast is led by Charlotte Ritchie and also includes Tanya Moodie, Nicholas Asbury and Raj Ghatak as well as Luke McQueen, Nick Helm, Rachel Stubbings, Jack Barry, Georgie Jones and Simon McCoy.

Principal photography took place in 2022, with 2nd Unit photography continuing in 2023. Filming locations included the London Bridge Hotel, and other locations in Borough and Old Street. The 24hr news broadcast with Simon McCoy was shot in a studio in Birmingham. All post-production was finished in 2024.

== Release ==
The film had its UK premiere at the Manchester Film Festival on 20 March 2025. It was shown at The London Comedy Film Festival 2025 in Brixton in May 2025. It was released digitally on 22 December 2025.
