= Random Acts of Flyness =

- Genre: Surrealist
- Created by: Terence Nance
- Presented by: Terence Nance
- Composers: Terrence Etc; Emile Mosseri; Nelson Bandela Nance; Jon Bap; Nick Hakim
- Country of origin: United States
- Original language: English
- No. of seasons: 2
- No. of episodes: 12

Production
- Executive producers: Kelley Robins Hicks; Kishori Rajan; Terence Nance; Jamund Washington; Ravi Nandan; John Hodges; Tamir Muhammad; Chanelle Aponte Pearson
- Cinematography: Shawn Peters
- Editors: Terence Nance; Kristan Sprague; Jonathan L. Proctor; Naima Ramos-Chapman
- Running time: 30–41 minutes
- Production companies: MVMT; A24 (season 1); Anonymous Content (season 2)

Original release
- Network: HBO
- Release: August 4, 2018 – December 24, 2022

Random Acts of Flyness is an American late-night surrealist television series created by Terence Nance that premiered on August 4, 2018 on HBO. Additionally, Nance appears in each episode of the series which he also wrote, directed, and executive produced. On August 20, 2018, it was announced that the series had been renewed for a second season. Season 2 premiered in December 2022.

== Premise ==
Random Acts of Flyness is described as a "fluid, mind-melting stream-of-conscious response to the contemporary American mediascape" in which each episode will "feature interconnected vignettes that makes the series a unique mix of vérité documentary, musical performances, surrealist melodrama and humorous animation."

== Production ==
=== Development ===
On January 29, 2018, it was announced that HBO had given the production a series order for a first season consisting of six episodes. The series was created by Terence Nance who will also write, direct, and executive produce. Producers are reportedly looking to cast a diverse group of performers with black actors eyed for many of the roles. Production companies involved in the series include MVMT.

On July 2, 2018, it was announced that the series would premiere on August 4, 2018. It was also reported that additional executive producers would include Tamir Muhammad, Jamund Washington, Kishori Rajan, Kelley Robins Hicks, Chanelle Aponte Pearson, Ravi Nandan, and John Hodges and that A24 had been added as an additional production company involved with the series. On August 20, 2018, it was announced that HBO had renewed the series for a second season.

=== Casting ===
Alongside the announcement of the series premiere, it was confirmed that Terence Nance would appear in all six episodes of the first season with guests including Whoopi Goldberg, Dominique Fishback, Gillian Jacobs, Jon Hamm, Ntare Guma Mwine, Adepero Oduye, Natalie Paul, Lakeith Stanfield, Tonya Pinkins, and Paul Sparks.

=== Marketing ===
On July 2, 2018, the first promo for the series was released.

== Episodes ==
Season	Episodes	Originally released	
Season	Episodes	First released	Last released
1	6	August 4, 2018	September 8, 2018
2	6	December 10, 2022	December 24, 2022

=== Season 1 (2018) ===
No. overall	No. in season	Title	Directed by	Written by	Original release date	U.S. viewers (millions)
1	1	"What Are Your Thoughts on Raising Free Black Children?"	Terence Nance, Frances Bodomo, & Shaka King	Terence Nance & Jamund Washington	August 4, 2018	0.153
Terence Nance introduces the show on his phone while riding his bike. He is stopped by a white police officer and an altercation occurs. Terence runs away while the cop pursues before suddenly flying away leaving the cop dumbstruck.; Terence narrates "Worry No. 473 of 1000 Worries that a Black Person Should Not Have to Worry About" based on an "actual" event where he accidentally stepped into a blue jalopy that belonged to a white woman.; Ripa the Reaper (Tonya Pinkins) hosts Everybody Dies!, a surreal television show where she explains to an audience of children that death happens to everyone.; Jon Hamm hosts an infomercial for "White Be Gone", an ointment that when applied to the temples, removes all white thoughts. He stops to cautiously ask the director, played by Michael Potts of the infomercial about his importance in the ad and he is assured that he is chosen because of his safe demeanor.; In Black Thought's Black Thoughts, Black Thought expresses his wish that shea butter be installed in public restrooms and wonders if it is objectification to admit that Michelle Obama has "got a booty".; In The Sexual Proclivities of the Black Community, Terence and Doreen Garner interview a bisexual black man named Yeelen Cohen about his experiences which are shown through the use of stop-motion animation.
2	2	"Two Piece and a Biscuit"	Terence Nance, Frances Bodomo, Darius Clark Munroe, Naima Ramos-Chapman, & Jamund Washington	Terence Nance, Jamund Washington, Frances Bodomo, Naima Ramos-Chapman, Nelson Nance, & Shaka King	August 11, 2018	0.123
3	3	"They Got Some Sh*t That'll Blow Out Our Back"	Terence Nance, Mariama Diallo, Darius Clark Monroe, Naima Ramos-Chapman, & Jamund Washington	Terence Nance, Jamund Washington, Frances Bodomo, Naima Ramos-Chapman, Mariama Diallo, Darius Clark Monroe, Nelson Nance, & Shaka King	August 18, 2018	0.168
4	4	"Items Outside the Shelter But Within Reach"	Terence Nance, Mariama Diallo, Darius Clark Monroe, Naima Ramos-Chapman, & Jamund Washington	Terence Nance, Jamund Washington, Frances Bodomo, Naima Ramos-Chapman, Mariama Diallo, & Darius Clark Monroe	August 25, 2018	0.163
5	5	"Tried to Tell My Therapist About My Dreams / MARTIN HAD A DREEEEAAAAM"	Terence Nance, Mariama Diallo, Darius Clark Monroe, Naima Ramos-Chapman, & Jamund Washington	Terence Nance, Jamund Washington, Mariama Diallo, & Darius Clark Monroe	September 1, 2018	0.132
6	6	"They Won't Go When I Go"	Terence Nance, Frances Bodomo, Mariama Diallo, Naima Ramos-Chapman, & Jamund Washington	Terence Nance, Jamund Washington, Frances Bodomo, & Naima Ramos-Chapman	September 8, 2018	0.110

=== Season 2: The Parable of the Pirate and the King (2022) ===
No. overall	No. in season	Title	Directed by	Written by	Original release date	U.S. viewers (millions)
7	1	"First Dimension: The Meaning of Your Name"	Terence Nance	Mariama Diallo & Nana Mensah & Nelson Nance & Jamund Washington & Terence Nance & Kelley Robins Hicks & Darius C. Monroe	December 10, 2022	N/A
8	2	"Second Dimension: Finna Hafta Teach You Swine Lovers"	Naima Ramos-Chapman	Mariama Diallo & Nana Mensah & Nelson Nance & Jamund Washington & Terence Nance & Kelley Robins Hicks & Darius C. Monroe	December 10, 2022	N/A
9	3	"Third Dimension: G/d Does Not Submit & Other Applicab"	Jenn Nkiru	Mariama Diallo & Nana Mensah & Nelson Nance & Jamund Washington & Terence Nance & Kelley Robins Hicks & Darius C. Monroe	December 17, 2022	N/A
10	4	"Fourth Dimension: Spacetime/bodyspirit"	Andrew Thomas Huang	Mariama Diallo & Nana Mensah & Nelson Nance & Jamund Washington & Terence Nance & Kelley Robins Hicks & Darius C. Monroe	December 17, 2022	N/A
11	5	"Fifth Dimension: The Parable of the Pirate & the King"	Nuotama Bodomo	Mariama Diallo & Nana Mensah & Nelson Nance & Jamund Washington & Terence Nance & Kelley Robins Hicks & Darius C. Monroe	December 24, 2022	N/A
12	6	"Sixth Dimension: All Possibilities of Together & Apar"	Jenn Nkiru	Mariama Diallo & Nana Mensah & Nelson Nance & Jamund Washington & Terence Nance & Kelley Robins Hicks & Darius C. Monroe	December 24, 2022	N/A

== Reception ==
The series has been met with a positive response from critics since its premiere, and has gone on to win a 2018 Peabody Award. On the review aggregation website Rotten Tomatoes, the series holds a 100% approval rating with an average rating of 8.45 out of 10 based on 25 reviews. The website's critical consensus reads, "Random Acts of Flyness' poignant political poetry plays in harmony with its frenetic absurdist humor to create a singular musical television experience." Metacritic, which uses a weighted average, assigned the series a score of 83 out of 100 based on 7 critics, indicating "universal acclaim".

In a positive review, The Los Angeles Times's Robert Lloyd offered the series praise saying, "Its meanings are sometimes obscure and sometimes obvious, nearly to the point of being polemical, and most often somewhere in between. But its surfaces are always interesting and splendidly executed. Even the glitches are artfully placed." In a similarly positive critique, The Hollywood Reporter's Robyn Bahr described the series as "a beautiful sensory overload" and commended the series visual look saying, "the protean barrage of imagery and gonzo sound design overwhelms the senses. Once your brain gets used to its staccato rhythm, however, you settle in for the ride. Although I couldn't quite process all the nuances within the moment, I still found myself nodding along (and even dancing along) all the same." In another favorable assessment, Variety's Caroline Framke commended the series' various segments saying, "they all reveal incisive truths about what it means to be black in America — or actually, "reveal" isn’t quite the right word, and neither is "show." Instead Acts of Flyness wants to make its (white) audience feel what it means to be black in America."
