= Chanelle Aponte Pearson =

American writer, producer, and director

- Born: Bronx, New York, New York
- Occupations: Writer, producer, director
- Notable work: 195 Lewis

Chanelle Aponte Pearson is an American writer, producer, and director. She is a member of the New Negress Film Society. She is best known as the director of 195 Lewis, a scripted web series about Black queer women living in Bed Stuy, Brooklyn. The series won the 2017 US Narrative Audience Award at the BlackStar Film Festival and received a Special Mention at 2017 Outfest.

== Career ==
Pearson began producing short films independently in the early aughts. Her first job on a feature film was as co-producer for Terence Nance's 2012 film An Oversimplification of Her Beauty. Pearson is currently the COO of Nance's production company, MVMT.

In 2015, Pearson won a grant from the Gotham Awards for her directorial debut, a web series called 195 Lewis. 195 Lewis is a scripted series that centers four Black queer women who live in Bed Stuy, and stars co-creator Rae Leone Allen, Trae Harris, D. Ajane Carlton, Sirita Wright, Roxie Johnson, and Taja Lindley. It debuted online on November 16, 2017. Latonya Pennington of Wear Your Voice magazine wrote in a review, "Whether in themselves or others, Black queer viewers will recognize the characters and love them. Through the efforts of the creators, director, and the cast, 195 Lewis tells a wonderful coming-of-age story of love, lust, and life in one of America’s blackest and queerest cities." It received a Special Mention at 2017 Outfest for "highlighting the contemporary life of queer black woman with flair, vibrancy and substance.”

Pearson is an executive producer for the 2018 HBO series Random Acts of Flyness. She is a member of the New Negress Film Society, a collective of Black women filmmakers founded in 2013 to "create community and spaces for support, exhibition, and consciousness-raising".

== Personal life ==
Pearson is queer. She was born and raised in the Bronx.

== Accolades ==
- 2015 Gotham Awards’ Spotlight on Women Filmmakers Live The Dream grant
- 2018 Gotham Award for Breakthrough Series – Short Form, 195 Lewis

== Filmography ==
Year	Title	Credited as			Notes
Year	Title	Director	Writer	Producer	Notes
2012	An Oversimplification of Her Beauty	No	No	Yes	
2017	195 Lewis	Yes	Yes	Executive	Web series
2018	Random Acts of Flyness	No	No	Executive	
