= 37 Days (TV series) =

- Genre: Drama
- Written by: Mark Hayhurst
- Directed by: Justin Hardy
- Composer: Andrew Simon McAllister
- Country of origin: United Kingdom
- Original language: English
- No. of series: 1
- No. of episodes: 3

Production
- Producers: Mark Hayhurst; Lucy Bassnett-McGuire; Susan Horth
- Cinematography: Douglas Hartington
- Editor: Adam Green
- Running time: 177 minutes
- Production company: Hardy Pictures

Original release
- Network: BBC Two; BBC Two HD
- Release: 6 March – 8 March 2014

37 Days is a British television drama that was first broadcast on BBC Two from 6 to 8 March 2014. The three-part miniseries covers the 37 days before World War I, from the assassination of Archduke Franz Ferdinand of Austria on 28 June 1914 to the United Kingdom declaring war on Germany on 4 August 1914.

== Cast ==
Cast of 37 Days — the senior members of the Cabinet.

- Ian McDiarmid as Edward Grey
- Nicholas Farrell as Eyre Crowe
- Tim Pigott-Smith as Herbert Henry Asquith
- Sinéad Cusack as Margot Asquith
- Bill Paterson as Lord Morley
- Kenneth Cranham as John Burns
- Ludger Pistor as Bethmann-Hollweg
- Rainer Sellien as Kaiser Wilhelm II
- Bernhard Schütz as Helmuth Moltke
- Mark Lewis Jones as David Lloyd George
- Nicholas Asbury as Winston Churchill
- Urs Remond as Prince Lichnowsky
- James McArdle as Alec
- André Kaczmarczyk as Jens
- Holger Kunkel as Falkenhayn
- Stephan Szasz as Jagow
- Kate Ambler as Muriel
- François-Éric Gendron as Paul Cambon
- Niall Cusack as Benckendorff
- George Lenz as Mensdorff
- Chris Kelly as Gavrilo Princip
- Oliver Ford Davies as Cunliffe
- Patrick Fitzsymons as King George V
- Ian Beattie as Tsar Nicholas II
- Simon Coury as Franz Ferdinand
- Rainer Reiners as Von Below
- Gordon Fulton as Sukhomlinov
- Mary Moulds as Sophie Chotek
- Christopher Leveaux as Lieutenant Feldmann

== Production ==
The series was shot entirely in Belfast, Northern Ireland. It is part of the BBC World War I centenary season and was first announced by Janice Hadlow, the controller of BBC Two, on 22 August 2013. The series seeks to quash assumptions about the war's inevitability, such as the Sarajevo shooting making the war inevitable.

Writer and producers Mark Hayhurst and Sue Horth compiled a 175-page book tracing "every conference, every telephone call, private letter and telegram swirling around Europe" before writing the script.

== Episode list ==
No.	Title	Directed by	Written by	Original release date	UK viewers (millions)
1	"One Month in Summer"	Justin Hardy	Mark Hayhurst	6 March 2014	2.89
2	"One Week in July"	Justin Hardy	Mark Hayhurst	7 March 2014	2.14
3	"One Long Weekend"	Justin Hardy	Mark Hayhurst	8 March 2014	1.84

== Reception ==
The series was positively reviewed by critics.

In a four-star review for The Times, Andrew Billen called the series "a clear and often brilliant dramatisation" and praised McDiarmid's portrayal of Grey as "surely one of the actor's greatest performances" though he found "the humour becomes slightly broader" in the scenes set in Berlin and Vienna and that the subplot of the two clerks "rather peters out".

In a four of five-star review for The Telegraph, Christopher Howse found the series "enthralling" but was distracted by the use of the Belfast City Hall as a location for Whitehall.

Andrew Anthony of The Guardian called the series a "meticulous rendering" and "impressively wordy and careful imagining" free of "romantic digressions or fictional appeals to sentiment", with a "strong performance" by McDiarmid; he also found the drama "rigid and simplistic" with "dubious stereotypes and an excess of rhetorical dialogue".

In The Independent, Ellen Jones wrote the series' "masterstroke" was "to reframe this history textbook timeline as a subtle character study", praising its "terrifically well written" dialogue.
