= Alma's Not Normal =

BBC television sitcom

- BBC programme image showing show logo and the cast (Nicholas Asbury, Sophie Willan, Siobhan Finneran and Lorraine Ashbourne)
- Genre: Comedy
- Created by: Sophie Willan
- Written by: Sophie Willan
- Directed by: Andrew Chaplin
- Starring: Sophie Willan; Jayde Adams; Siobhan Finneran; James Baxter; Nicholas Asbury; Lorraine Ashbourne; Maizie Wickson
- Narrated by: Sophie Willan
- Country of origin: United Kingdom
- Original language: English
- No. of series: 2
- No. of episodes: 12

Production
- Executive producers: Nerys Evans; Sophie Willan
- Producer: Gill Isles
- Running time: 30 minutes

Original release
- Network: BBC Two
- Release: 7 April 2020 – 11 November 2024

Alma's Not Normal is a British sitcom first broadcast as a pilot episode on BBC Two in April 2020. The series follows the eponymous Alma, from Bolton, as she tries to give her life meaning and the "fabulous" outcome she has always dreamed of, while coping with the strained relationships of her family that saw her spend time in care, something else which she is trying to reconcile. The series is written by and stars Sophie Willan, and is inspired by her own experiences of the care system and working as a call girl.

Willan won the 2021 BAFTA Television award for best comedy writer for the pilot episode. A full six episode series was commissioned for broadcast in 2021. A second series was commissioned in 2022, which premiered on 7 October 2024.

Series 2 is the last, although Willan has said that there is a Christmas special in the works, however this has not been confirmed.

== Background ==
Willan wrote the first draft around 2014 on the back of the austerity measures of the Cameron Government, that Willan says "felt really negative for welfare recipients, mental health [care] and social services recipients – people like my mother, people who've had difficulties." As Laura Minor argues, "Alma's Not Normal provides commentary on the gendered and classed impacts of austerity in the North."

Willan won the BBC's Caroline Aherne Bursary in 2017 which awarded her £5,000 to develop her ideas along with mentorship from the BBC's Comedy Commissioning Editor, Kate Daughton, to develop a script. The script was performed as a rehearsed reading in front of an invited audience including Controller of BBC Two, Patrick Holland. Willan was given a commission for a pilot on the spot. Willan wrote the script for the first series of the show during the COVID-19 pandemic.

== Cast and characters ==
- Sophie Willan as Alma Nuthall: Alma is a working-class aspiring actress in her thirties who has recently been through a break-up. She spent some of her childhood in care, left school without qualifications and works as an escort.
  - Maizie Wickson as young Alma
- Jayde Adams as Leanne: Alma's confident and sexually promiscuous best friend from Bristol and main confidant of the series. Alma describes Leanne as having the "raw sex appeal of Debbie Harry but the mannerisms of a truck driver."
- Siobhan Finneran as Lin Nuthall: Alma's mother. Lin struggles with mental health issues and a heroin addiction that meant she was unable to look after Alma during childhood, and she has a troubled relationship with Alma in adulthood.
  - Matilda Freeman as young Lin
- Lorraine Ashbourne as Joan Nuthall: Joan is Lin's mother and Alma's grandmother. She raised Alma as a child when Lin was unable to. Alma regularly visits Joan as an adult.
- James Baxter as Anthony: Alma's ex-boyfriend (Series 1)
- Nicholas Asbury as Jim: Lin's schizophrenic boyfriend
- Dave Jones as Bill: Leanne's boss-turned-employee
- Jemma Churchill as Sandra: Joan's passive-aggressive neighbour
- Dave Spikey as Ian: a drama teacher
- Amy Gledhill as Lesley: one of Ian's students
- Shahzeb Aslam as Brian: one of Ian's students
- Tupele Dorgu as Cheryl: a fitness teacher (Series 1)
- Sue Vincent as Trish: Anthony's mother (Series 1)
- Katie Redford as Jane (Series 1)
- Kenneth Collard as David (Series 2)
- Julie Hesmondhalgh as Aunty Ange (Series 2)
- Nick Mohammed as Jules Goodwin (Series 2)
- Selina Mosinski as Aunty Evie (Series 2)
- Steve Pemberton as Uncle Dickie (Series 2)
- Ash Hunter as Sam (Series 2)
- Craig Parkinson as Richard: Alma's father (Series 2)

== Episodes ==
Series	Episodes	Originally released	
Series	Episodes	First released	Last released
P	1	7 April 2020	
1	6	13 September 2021	18 October 2021
2	6	7 October 2024	11 November 2024

=== Pilot (2020) ===
No. in series	Title	Directed by	Written by	Original release date	BBC Two broadcast	U.K viewers (millions)
Pilot	"Alma's Not Normal"	Andrew Chaplin	Sophie Willan	7 April 2020	7 April 2020	N/A (<1.66) (Note: Not reported in the weekly top 15 programmes for four-screen viewer ratings.)

=== Series 1 (2021) ===
Episode one is the pilot episode, renamed as Feng Suey.

No. overall	No. in series	Title	Directed by	Written by	Original release date	BBC Two broadcast	U.K viewers (millions)
1	1	"Feng Suey"	Andrew Chaplin	Sophie Willan	13 September 2021	13 September 2021	1.08
Alma cycles to a job centre where she wishes to seek employment but is specific about the type of job she wants to do. Carol the job centre worker forces her to apply for sandwich shop Sub'N'Go but Alma is less than keen. Alma visits her friend Leanne at the cafe to discuss her ex-boyfriend Anthony owing her money and leaving her for a younger girlfriend. Alma plans to visit Anthony to get money off him but they end up having sex. Alma visits her heroin addict mum Lin and convinces her grandmother Joan to reconnect with her after five years. Alma decides to apply for an escort agency.
2	2	"Ruby"	Andrew Chaplin	Sophie Willan	13 September 2021	20 September 2021	N/A
Alma's job at Sub'n'Go doesn't work out and she begins work as an escort.
3	3	"The Richard Gere"	Andrew Chaplin	Sophie Willan	13 September 2021	27 September 2021	N/A
Alma attempts to reconcile Lin and Joan at an upmarket restaurant.
4	4	"Boom and Bust"	Andrew Chaplin	Sophie Willan	13 September 2021	4 October 2021	N/A
Joan reluctantly lets Lin move back in with her as her section has ended.
5	5	"On Record"	Andrew Chaplin	Sophie Willan	13 September 2021	11 October 2021	N/A
Alma receives her care records from the council, and wins an acting part after a successful audition.
6	6	"Sticking With You"	Andrew Chaplin	Sophie Willan	13 September 2021	18 October 2021	N/A
Lin runs away from Joan and Alma and back to heroin. Alma decides to follow her dreams as an actress.

=== Series 2 (2024) ===
No. overall	No. in series	Title	Directed by	Written by	Original release date	BBC Two broadcast	U.K viewers (millions)
7	1	"No Going Back"	Andrew Chaplin	Sophie Willan	TBA	7 October 2024	TBD
8	2	"Padaming All Over the Place"	Andrew Chaplin	Sophie Willan	TBA	14 October 2024	TBD
9	3	"Who the F Is Alice?"	Andrew Chaplin	Sophie Willan	TBA	21 October 2024	TBD
10	4	"The Black and White Movie"	Andrew Chaplin	Sophie Willan	TBA	28 October 2024	TBD
11	5	"Non, Je Ne Regrette Rien"	Andrew Chaplin	Sophie Willan	TBA	4 November 2024	TBD
12	6	"Never Give a Hamster Matches"	Andrew Chaplin	Sophie Willan	TBA	11 November 2024	TBD

== Reception ==
In her four star review of the pilot episode broadcast in 2020, Lucy Mangan in The Guardian praised the fine cast and the "swiftly and surely drawn characters" and commented on the episode's "emotional undertow, that, with perfect timing, surfaces to punch the viewer in the stomach and leave them breathless with sorrow". The episode was summed up as a bleak, brilliant comedy that was far from ordinary. Writing in Chortle, Steve Bennett praised the episode for the way that it introduced "a cast of intriguing, sympathetic characters we'd like to hear more from" praising them for being "complex, authentic people portrayed in a way we don’t usually see on television". He praised the "universally strong performances" of the cast and the humanity of the characters bringing lightness to what could have been a bleak set of subject matter.

The Daily Mirror's Ian Hyland called it "Phoenix Nights meets Fleabag, guided by the spirit of Victoria Wood" adding that the pilot convinced him "that BBC2 has a massive gem on its hands".

Ben Dowell of The Times said, "Willan's writing is skilled and clearly very personal...uplifting and strangely enchanting".

=== Awards ===
In April 2021, Willan won the Comedy Writer BAFTA for the pilot episode. The 2021 series won the award for best comedy programme at the Royal Television Society North West Awards.

Year	Award	Category	Nominee(s)	Result	Ref.
2021	British Academy Television Craft Awards	Best Writer: Comedy	Sophie Willan	Won	
2021	Royal Television Society Awards	Comedy Performance – Female	Sophie Willan	Nominated	
2022	Broadcast Awards	Best Comedy Programme	Alma's Not Normal	Won	
2022	British Academy Television Awards	Best Female Comedy Performance	Sophie Willan	Won	
2022	British Academy Television Awards	Best Scripted Comedy	Alma's Not Normal	Nominated	
2022	British Academy Television Awards	Writer: Comedy	Sophie Willan	Nominated	
2022	Broadcasting Press Guild Awards	Best Comedy	Alma's Not Normal	Won	
2022	Royal Television Society Awards	Comedy Performance - Female	Sophie Willan	Nominated	
2022	Royal Television Society Awards	Scripted Comedy	Alma's Not Normal	Won	
2022	Royal Television Society Craft & Design Awards	Director - Comedy Drama & Situation Comedy	Andrew Chaplin	Won	
2025	Royal Television Society Awards	Comedy Drama	Alma's Not Normal	Won	
2025	Royal Television Society Awards	Comedy Performance (Female)	Sophie Willan	Won	
2025	Royal Television Society Awards	Writer - Comedy	Sophie Willan	Won	
2025	British Academy Television Awards	Female Performance in a Comedy	Sophie Willan	Nominated	
2025	British Academy Television Awards	Scripted Comedy	Alma's Not Normal	Won	
