= Katharine DeShaw =

American consultant in philanthropy

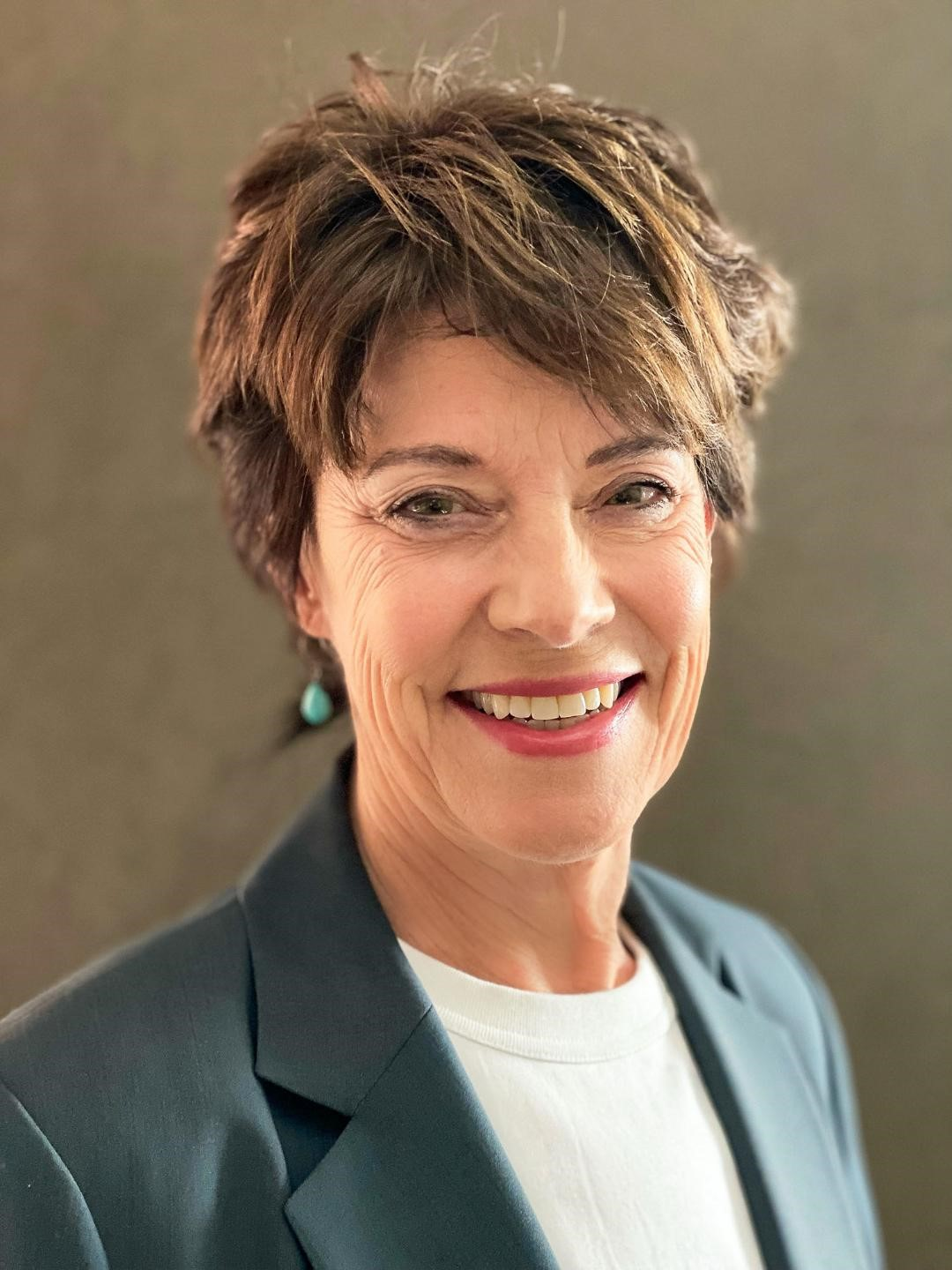
- Born: Duluth, Minnesota, United States
- Occupations: Consultant; Fundraiser; Public speaker
- Years active: 1977–present

Katharine DeShaw is an American consultant in philanthropy, fundraiser, writer, teacher, and public speaker. She served as the deputy director for Advancement and External Relations for the Academy Museum of Motion Pictures. During 2005 to 2013, she served as the Founding Executive Director of United States Artists (USA) and its crowdfunding site USA Projects.

Prior to her tenure at United States Artists, she established and led the Leonard and Susan Bay Nimoy Foundation. Previously, she headed development efforts at the Los Angeles County Museum of Art (LACMA), the Walker Art Center of Minneapolis, and Gay Men's Health Crisis in New York City. From 2014 to 2019, she served on the faculty of the Getty Leadership Institute.

== Early life and education ==
DeShaw was born and raised in Duluth, Minnesota, United States. As a teenager she volunteered at the Duluth Community Health Center (now Lake Superior Community Health Center) and the Whole Foods Co-op – two organizations that her mother, Katharine Rheinberger, had founded. DeShaw graduated from Duluth east high school in 1974, and from 1974 to 1977 attended Colorado College, where she majored in Political Science and Art History.

== Career ==
DeShaw began her career in arts administration after her final years at Colorado College, when she joined the Chicago Moving Company and the Chicago Dance Center under the direction of Nana Shineflug. In 1980, DeShaw received a National Endowment for the Arts Management Fellowship in Washington DC. She then moved to New York City to work for Twyla Tharp and her dance company. In 1983, she advanced Second Lady Joan Mondale (called "Joan of Arts") during the Mondale for President campaign for the Minnesotan Vice President Walter Mondale. In 1984, she became the Founding Director of the Harkness Center for Dance (formerly Harkness House for Ballet), originally founded by Rebekah Harkness. From 1985 to 1988, DeShaw headed development and communications for the New York City Chapter of the National Multiple Sclerosis Society. From 1988 to 1991, she worked as the director of development at Gay Men's Health Crisis fundraising for services for people with AIDS. In 1991, she moved to Minneapolis to lead development efforts at the Walker Art Center until 1999. During this time, she also served as the president of the Art Museum Development Association in 1994. She also led development efforts at LACMA from 1999 until 2002. From 2002 to 2015, she designed and led a family foundation for Leonard Nimoy and Susan Bay Nimoy.

In 2005, DeShaw became the founding CEO of United States Artists with the aim to provide grants of $50,000 to 50 artists annually across diverse fields. Notable USA Fellows of United States Artists include Frank Big Bear; Mark Bradford; Lee Isaac Chung; Monica Ponce de Leon; Anna Halprin; Quiara Alegría Hudes; Barry Jenkins; Catherine Opie; Anna Deavere Smith; Luis Valdez; Chris Ware; etc. In 2014, DeShaw founded her consultancy firm, Philanthropology, related to philanthropy and fundraising.

In 2016, she became the deputy director for Advancement and External Relations for the Academy Museum of Motion Pictures where she built the fundraising, marketing, and communications teams for the Renzo Piano-designed film center.

In December 2020, DeShaw completed its $388 million capital campaign chaired by Bob Iger of The Walt Disney Company, Annette Bening, and Tom Hanks. In 2021, she resumed her consulting practice.
