= An Oversimplification of Her Beauty =

- Directed by: Terence Nance
- Screenplay by: Terence Nance
- Based on: How Would You Feel? by Terence Nance
- Produced by: Chanelle Aponte Pearson; James Bartlett; Andrew Corkin; Terence Nance
- Starring: Terence Nance; Namik Minter
- Narrated by: Reg E. Cathey; Terence Nance; Namik Minter; Onyinyechi Amanze
- Cinematography: Matthew E. Bray; Shawn Peters
- Edited by: Terence Nance
- Music by: Flying Lotus
- Distributed by: Variance Films
- Release date: January 21, 2012 (Sundance Film Festival)
- Running time: 93 minutes
- Country: United States
- Language: English

An Oversimplification of Her Beauty is a 2012 American animated romantic comedy drama film written and directed by Terence Nance in his feature directorial debut. The film follows a quixotic artist who, when stood up by an attractive woman, makes a film about it and shows it to her. The film was adapted from Nance's 2006 short film, How Would You Feel?. It premiered at the 2012 Sundance Film Festival and has received generally positive reviews from critics.

== Synopsis ==
When a young man (Terence Nance) is stood up on a date by a beautiful woman (Namik Minter), he begins to wonder about the nature of feelings and what exactly makes up a specific moment in time.

== Cast ==
- Terence Nance as Terence
- Alisa Becher
- Jc Cain
- Dexter Jones
- Namik Minter
- Talibah Lateefah Newman
- Chanelle Aponte Pearson

== Reception ==
Critical reception for An Oversimplification of Her Beauty has been mostly positive and the film holds a rating of 74 on Metacritic (based on 11 reviews) and a rating of 82% on Rotten Tomatoes (based on 38 reviews).

=== Awards ===
- Best Film Not Playing at a Theater Near You at the Gotham Independent Film Awards (2012, won)

== See also ==
- List of Afrofuturist films
- List of black films of the 2010s
