= Homegoings (film) =

- Directed by: Christine Turner
- Release date: February 28, 2013
- Country: United States

Homegoings is a 2013 documentary film directed by Christine Turner about the Owens Funeral Home on Lenox Avenue in Harlem, exploring African-American death rituals through the work of funeral home director Isaiah Owens. The film premiered February 28 at the Museum of Modern Art's 'Documentary Fortnight 2013' showcase, before airing on PBS-TV's POV series and screening for a week at the Maysles Cinema.

A Brooklyn-based documentary filmmaker and child of a Chinese-American mother and African-American father, Turner has stated she initially became interested in death rituals after both of her grandmothers died within two weeks of each other. She subsequently contacted Owens—known as "Fix Em" for his ability to repair corpses ravaged by disease, accident or violence—after reading a newspaper article about his work. Filming began in 2009.
