= Afronauts (2014 short film) =

2014 American short film

- Directed by: Nuotama Bodomo
- Written by: Nuotama Bodomo
- Produced by: Isabella Wing-Davey
- Starring: Diandra Forrest as Matha; Yolonda Ross as Auntie Sunday; Hoji Fortuna as Nkoloso
- Cinematography: Joshua James Richards
- Edited by: Sara Shaw
- Music by: Brian McOmber
- Release date: 2014
- Running time: 14 min.
- Country: United States
- Language: English

Afronauts is a 2014 science fiction short film about Zambian outcasts preparing to beat America in the space race to the Moon. Written and directed by Ghanaian filmmaker Nuotama Bodomo, Afronauts is her pre-thesis film for NYU's Tisch School of the Arts Graduate Film Program.

== Plot ==
Set in the 1960s, 17-year-old Matha is chosen to be Zambia's first person to land on the Moon. Through a series of space training experiments led by schoolteacher Nksoloso's space program, the group of Zambian exiles plan to beat the U.S. to the Moon. Matha deals with the expectations and responsibility placed upon her while her aunt fears Matha is being used as a disposable sacrifice.

== Background ==
The Afrofuturist film is a work of speculative fiction. It challenges the "Western gaze" and imagines Africans traveling to space with themes of technology being used as a tool to challenge colonialism and gain independence. It is inspired by the true story of school teacher and activist Edward Mukuka Nkoloso training 17-year-old Matha Mwamba and two cats by rolling them down hills in oil drums to become astronauts. Nkoloso wrote an Op-Ed “We’re Going to Mars! With a Spacegirl, Two Cats and a Missionary” and requested a £7M grant from UNESCO.

Bodomo first discovered the afronauts on Tumblr in a YouTube video of a 1964 newsreel of the Zambian space program. The black and white film aesthetic of Afronauts replicates 1960s black and white photos and videos of Africa and questions the validity and reality of ethnography and newsreels of the time, as well as creating a sense of "otherworldliness."

== Production ==
- Written and directed by Nuotama Bodomo
- Produced by Isabella Wing-Davey
- Co-Produced by Sydney Buchan
- Executive Produced by Ken Birdwell, Eric Cotten, Keyvan Dastmalchi, Felecia Hunter, Akosua Adoma Owusu, Felicia Pasculli, Matthew Shields
- Associate Produced by Claudio Bottaccini, Terri Simone Francis, AnnaRose King, Lucas Zaiden
- Cinematography by Joshua James Richards
- Production Design by Celi Lamenca
- Costume Design by Sarita Fellows
- Film Editing by Sara Shaw
- Sound Design by Scott Hirsch
- Music by Brian McOmber

The short film was shot in Brooklyn and New Jersey.

A feature film of the same title and story is currently in the works. It will be written and directed by Nuotama Bodomo and produced by Vincho Nchogu and Ryan Zacarias. The film is supported by Sundance Institute, Cinereach, Tribeca Film institute, IFP, Film independent, Alfred P. Sloan Foundation. In 2014, Bodomo kicked off development for the feature as a part of a workshop with the Durban International Film Festival.

== Exhibition ==
Afronauts first premiered at the 2014 Sundance Film Festival and its international premiere was at the 2014 Berlin International Film Festival. Other exhibitions include "Dreamlands: Immersive Cinema and Art, 1905–2016" at the Whitney Museum of American Art, "Dimensions of Citizenship, Future Imperfect: The Uncanny in Science Fiction" at the Venice Biennale Architecture (US Pavilion), "Future imperfect: The Uncanny in Science Fiction" at the Museum of Modern Art, "Into the Unknown: A Journey Through Science Fiction" at Barbican Centre, "African Futures" at Goethe-Institut Johannesburg, "Making Africa" at Vitra Design Museum.

For the 50th anniversary of Apollo 11, Afronauts made its online debut in 2019 on numerous sites including Vernac Media, NoBudge, and Boiler Room's 4:3.

== See also ==
- List of Afrofuturist films
- Black Women Filmmakers
- Ghanaian Filmmakers
