= The Afronauts (British play) =

2026 British play

Afronauts is a British play written by Ryan Calais Cameron and co-directed by Monique Touko and Cameron about the Zambian space program in 1964. It is scheduled to have its world premiere at the Royal Court Theatre in London in November of 2026.
