= Nicholas Asbury =

British actor and writer

Nicholas Asbury (born 13 February 1971) is a British actor and author. He won an Olivier Award as part of the Royal Shakespeare Company's complete cycle of Shakespeare's history plays in 2009 and is known for television roles such as Winston Churchill in the BBC's 37 Days, Mr. Angel in Hugh Laurie's Why Didn't They Ask Evans?, and Jim in the BAFTA award-winning Alma's Not Normal.

== Career ==
Asbury attended Hereford Cathedral School, then Dartington College of Arts. In 1998 he performed at The Watermill Theatre, before joining the ensemble of the Royal Shakespeare Company from 1999 until 2008. He subsequently acted in the all-male Shakespearean troupe Propeller, for whom he also composed music. A diary of his experiences acting in Propeller's 2011/12 productions of Henry V and The Winter's Tale was featured as a series in The Guardian.

His first book, Exit Pursued by a Badger, is a record of his involvement in Michael Boyd's The Histories Cycle with the RSC. It won the Michael Meyer Award from The Society of Authors in 2011. He has since appeared in television series such as The Inbetweeners, Chewing Gum, Sherlock, and Alma's Not Normal. His second book, White Hart, Red Lion, is a work of travel literature revisiting the subject of Shakespeare's history plays through the locations that feature in them.

== Filmography ==
Year	Title	Role	Notes
1998	Hetty Wainthropp Investigates	Eric Pardew	TV series, S4.E5 "Blood Relations"
2002	Silent Witness	Armed Officer #1	TV series, S6.E5 "Tell No Tales"
2004	He Knew He Was Right	Policeman	TV serial
2004	The Basil Brush Show	Mr. Foxman	TV series, S3.E8 "The Candidate"
2004	Dunkirk	Captain Michael Denny RN	TV series, 3 episodes
2004-2019	Doctors	Various roles	TV series, 7 episodes
2006	The Bill	Billy Vaughn	TV series, S22.E24 "Special Relationships"
2009	The Legend of Dick and Dom	Burly Bloke	TV series, S1.E7 "Nan Trap"
2009	Heartbeat	Tomasz Burowski	TV series, S18.E7 "Return Crossing"
2009	My Last Five Girlfriends	Shakespeare	Film
2010	The Inbetweeners	Tara's Dad	TV series, S3.E3 "Will's Dilemma"
2011	Hustle	Talbot	TV series, S7.E2
2011	Midsomer Murders	Henry	TV series, S14.E1 "Death in the Slow Lane"
2011	The Jury	Romeo Boy	TV serial (second series)
2011-2016	Coronation Street	Alastair Burton	TV series, 7 episodes
2012	Shadow Dancer	Agent 2	Film
2013	Love and Marriage	Steve Simpson	TV series, S1.E3 "Secrets & Lies"
2013-2014	Da Vinci's Demons	Mario	TV series, 2 episodes
2014	Sherlock	Landlord	TV series, S3.E2 "The Sign of Three"
2014	The Bletchley Circle	Interviewer 1	TV series, S2.E2 "Uncustomed Goods"
2014	37 Days	Winston Churchill	TV serial
2014	EastEnders	CPS Barrister	TV series, 3 episodes
2014	The Crimson Field	Padre	TV series, S1.E3
2014	Drifters	Uncle Nige	TV series, S2.E5 "Hen Don't"
2014	Borgia	Bernado Grammante	TV series, S3.E4 "1498"
2014–2018	Emmerdale	Various roles	TV series, 14 episodes
2015	Arthur and Merlin	Orin	Film
2015	A Song for Jenny	Martyn	TV film
2015	Doctor Who	Etoine	TV series, S9.E8 "The Zygon Inversion"
2015–2017	Chewing Gum	Keys	TV series, 5 episodes
2016	The Five	Martin Clark	TV serial
2016	Casualty	Pete Meyer	TV series, S30.E40 "What Lies Beneath"
2016	Agatha Raisin	Peter Rice	TV series, S1.E5 "The Vicious Vet"
2017	Call the Midwife	Mr. Wylton	TV series, S6.E1
2017	Babs	Gerald Thomas	TV film
2017	Papillon	Commandant	Film
2017	Russia 1917: Countdown to Revolution	Lenin	TV film
2017	Borderline	Mr. Martins	TV series, S2.E2 "Strike"
2018	Innocent	Ryland	TV serial
2018	The Alienist	Dr. Tuthill	TV series, 2 episodes
2018	Shakespeare & Hathaway: Private Investigators	Trevor Cordiss	TV series, S1.E9 "The Rascal Cook"
2018	Dark Heart	Guy Dawlish	TV series, S1.E1 "Suffer the Children"
2018	Hold the Dark	Doctor	Film
2019	Luther	DCI Woodgate	TV series, S5.E4
2020	The Last Kingdom	Brother Iestyn	TV series, 2 episodes
2021	Manhunt	Inspector Len Adler	TV series, S2.E3 "The Night Stalker"
2021	Alma's Not Normal	Jim	TV series, 6 episodes
2022	Crime	Oliver Heathcoat	TV series, S2.E1
2022	Anne	Dr. James Burns	TV series, S1.E2
2022	Brian and Charles	Stu	Film
2022	Death in Paradise	Gerry Wigsworth	TV series, S11.E5 "Painkiller Thriller"
2022	Why Didn't They Ask Evans?	Mr. Angel	TV serial

== Bibliography ==
- Exit Pursued by a Badger: An Actor's Journey Through History with Shakespeare. Oberon Books. 2010. ISBN 978-1-840028-92-8.
- White Hart, Red Lion: The England of Shakespeare's Histories. Oberon Books. 2013. ISBN 978-1-849432-41-2.
