= The Feeling of Being Watched =

2018 documentary film, directed and produced by Assia Boundaoui

- Theatrical release poster
- Directed by: Assia Boundaoui
- Written by: Assia Boundaoui
- Produced by: Jessica Devaney; Assia Boundaoui; Alex Bushe
- Starring: Assia Boundaoui
- Cinematography: Shuling Yong
- Edited by: Rabab Haj Yahya
- Music by: Angélica Negrón
- Production companies: Impact Partners; Multitude Films; Inverse Surveillance Project; Naked Edge Films; JustFilms/Ford Foundation; Chicken & Egg Pictures; Catapult Film Fund; POV; Tribeca Film Institute; Chicago Media Project; Gucci; IFP
- Distributed by: Women Make Movies
- Release dates: April 21, 2018 (Tribeca Film Festival); June 21, 2019 (United States)
- Running time: 87 minutes
- Country: United States
- Language: English

The Feeling of Being Watched is a 2018 documentary film directed and produced by Assia Boundaoui in her directorial debut. The film stars Assia Boundaoui with Rabia Boundaoui, Iman Boundaoui, Nouha Boundaoui, Sohib Boundaoui, and Christina Abraham. The plot follows Boundaoui as she investigates rumors that her Arab-American neighborhood outside Chicago is being monitored by the Federal Bureau of Investigation (FBI).

It had its world premiere at the Tribeca Film Festival on April 21, 2018. It was released on June 21, 2019, by Women Make Movies. The Feeling of Being Watched won Best Documentary at the BlackStar Film Festival and the Camden International Film Festival. It was nominated for the Audience Award at the Glasgow Film Festival, and Best Documentary at CAAMFest.

== Synopsis ==
Assia Boundaoui grew up in the Arab-American neighborhood of Bridgeview, Illinois, a suburb of Chicago which counts among its residents about 200 Muslim families. Her neighbors believe they have been under surveillance for a decade or more. When she explores her neighbors' experiences, Assia discovers thousands of pages of FBI documents which prove that the neighborhood was the subject of counter-terrorism investigation before the September 11 attacks. Code-named "Operation Vulgar Betrayal", the surveillance operation amassed more than 30,000 documents on Muslim residents and neighborhood organizations, though no arrests or links to terrorist activity were ever made.

== Cast ==
Credits adapted from Rotten Tomatoes:

- Assia Boundaoui as herself
- Rabia Boundaoui as Assia's mother
- Iman Boundaoui as Assia's sister
- Nouha Boundaoui as Assia's sister
- Sohib Boundaoui as Assia's brother
- Christina Abraham as Assia's lawyer

== Production ==
On 23 September 2019, director Assia Boundaoui and producer Alex Bushe launched a Kickstarter campaign to raise funds for a documentary film. The campaign raised $33,057 out of a $30,000 goal, with 187 backers. After they raised $33,057 the duo wrote on Kickstarter,

We'll be able to shoot the rest of the film, and stay on-track to finish the film late next year. We couldn't have done it without each and every one of you, and are humbled to have experienced the growth of such a wonderfully supportive community around our film. You guys are the best!

— Assia Boundaoui and Alex Bushe, Kickstarter

Boundaoui returned to Bridgeview as a qualified journalist to interview family and neighbors about what they remembered about the surveillance. In the 1990s, this included low-flying helicopters passing frequently overhead, cameras mounted on buildings, and vans parked outside houses. Boundaoui then documents her appeals to the Department of Justice to uncover the truth of government spying. The film shows the support she received from family and neighbors; one family friend is seen chiding her affectionately, "You troublemaker, you!"

== Reception ==
=== Critical response ===
On the review aggregator Rotten Tomatoes, the film holds an approval rating of 93% based on 14 reviews, with an average rating of 7.5/10. Metacritic, which uses a weighted average, assigned the film a score of 79 out of 100, based on 5 critics, indicating "Generally favorable reviews".

Sheri Linden of The Hollywood Reporter wrote: "The chilling effect of a life under surveillance is at the heart of the film. As it pieces together the timeline of events in the director's Chicago suburb and beyond, The Feeling of Being Watched takes shape as an incisive inquiry". Guy Lodge writing for Variety wrote: "Shot and cut to match its maker's no-nonsense drive, this tense, frightening film culminates in a more hopeful call to activist arms, finding as much security in ethnic and religious communities as others do suspicion".

Nathanael Hood writing for The Young Folks criticized the film for not living up to its potential; he commended the first third of the film as it "magnificently captures the feeling of nervous menace felt by the people of Bridgeview", but Boundaoui's requests for documents from the Department of Justice do not convey a "cohesive sense of urgency". However he praised The Feeling of Being Watched for "seeking justice for a persecuted minority".

=== Accolades ===
Year	Award	Category	Result	Ref(s).
2018	BlackStar Film Festival	Best Documentary	Won	
2018	Camden International Film Festival	Audience Award	Won	
2018	Camden International Film Festival	John Marshall Award	Nominated	
2018	Camden International Film Festival	Best Documentary Feature	Won	
2018	Chicago International Film Festival	Best Documentary	Nominated	
2018	Milwaukee Film Festival	Documentary Jury Award – Special Mention	Won	
2018	Woodstock Film Festival	Best Editing – Documentary Feature	Won	
2018	Woodstock Film Festival	James Lyons Award	Won	
2018	Woodstock Film Festival	Jury Prize	Won	
2018	Woodstock Film Festival	Maverick Award	Won	
2019	CAAMFest	Jury Award – Best Documentary	Nominated	
2019	Glasgow Film Festival	Audience Award	Nominated	
