= Radhika Vaz =

Indian comedian and writer (born 1973)

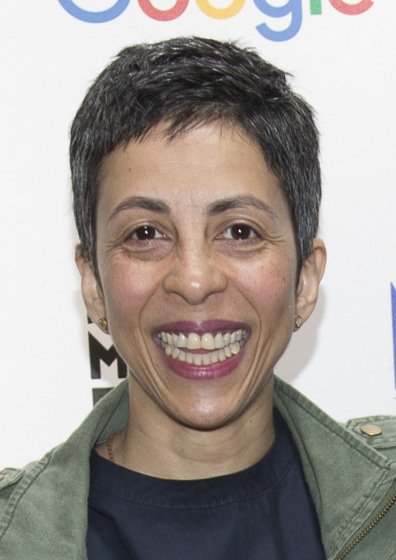
Radhika Vaz, in 2017.

Radhika Vaz (born 1973) is an Indian comedian and writer. Born in Mumbai, Vaz worked as an advertising executive in Chennai and has done her master's in advertising from Syracuse University, New York.

== Biography ==
Radhika Vaz went for improvisational theatre class, and she said this helped her start off as a performer and a writer; she trained at Groundlings School (Los Angeles) and Improvolution (New York). In 2014, she performed in New York and in the Indian cities of Mumbai, Chennai, Bangalore, Kochi, Gurgaon and Delhi in September for her act Older. Angrier. Hairier; she has done a play ''Unladylike: The Pitfalls of Propriety''. She is a columnist for The Times of India. Vaz cites Patrice O’Neal and Bill Hicks as her inspiration for her show. She is the co-creator of web-series Shugs & Fats with Nadia P. Manzoor, which won a Gotham Award and is now in development with Amazon Studios.
