= Yaba Blay =

Ghanaian-American scholar

- Born: 1974 (age 51–52)

Academic work
- Institutions: North Carolina Central University

Yaba Blay is a Ghanaian-American professor, scholar-activist, public speaker, cultural worker, and consultant. She is originally from Ghana, West Africa, and was raised in New Orleans, Louisiana, United States. Her scholarship, work, and practice center on the lived experiences of Black women and girls, with a particular focus on identity politics and beauty practices. A social media activist, she has launched several viral campaigns, including Locs of Love, #PrettyPeriod, and #ProfessionalBlackGirl, in her multi-platform digital community.

In 2012, Blay served as a producer on CNN's television documentary, "Who is Black in America?". She has since been named one of today's leading Black voices by 'The Root 100', and Essence Magazine's 'Woke 100.' She has appeared on Good Morning America, CNN, BET, MSNBC, BBC, and NPR and her work has been featured in The New York Times, EBONY, Essence, Fast Company, The Philadelphia Inquirer, ColorLines, and The Root. Her commentary is featured in A Changing America: 1968 and Beyond, a permanent installation exhibited in the National Museum of African American History and Culture.

She is also the author of the award-winning One Drop: Shifting the Lens on Race.

== Education ==
Blay was born and raised in New Orleans, US, where her Ghanaian parents had relocated. She received her B.A. in psychology (cum laude) from Salisbury State University, her M.Ed. in counseling psychology from the University of New Orleans, and her M.A. and Ph.D. in African American studies with a Graduate Certificate in women's studies from Temple University. She has also taught on the faculties of Lehigh University, Lafayette College, and Drexel University, where she served as the director of the Africana Studies program, and was the former Dan Blue Endowed Chair in Political Science at North Carolina Central University.

== Career ==
Blay is the author of One Drop: Shifting the Lens on Race and artistic director of the One Drop project. In One Drop, she explores the interconnected nuances of skin color politics and racial identity, and challenges perceptions of blackness as both an identity and lived reality. In 2012, she served as a consulting producer for CNN Black in America - Who is Black in America? - a television documentary inspired by the scope of her One Drop project. She also co-produced a transmedia film (So Young So Pretty So White) focused on the global practice of skin bleaching with director Terence Nance.

While her broader research interests are related to African cultural aesthetics, aesthetic practices, and global Black popular culture, Blay's specific research interests lie within global Black identities and the politics of embodiment, with particular attention given to hair and skin color politics. Her 2007 dissertation, Yellow Fever: Skin Bleaching and the Politics of Skin Color in Ghana, relies upon African-centered and African feminist methodologies to investigate the social practice of skin bleaching in Ghana. Her ethnographic case study of skin color and identity in New Orleans, entitled "Pretty Color and Good Hair, is featured as part of the anthology Blackberries and Redbones: Critical Articulations of Black Hair/Body Politics in Africana Communities.

== Research and selected writings ==
Research

- One Drop: Shifting the Lens on Race, 2013. ISBN 978-0989664509
- "Yellow Fever: Skin Bleaching and the Politics of Skin Color in Ghana"
- "Pretty Color and Good Hair"

Selected writings

- "White Supremacist would be Black under America's One-Drop Rule"
- "Tell a Brown Girl She's Pretty, Dreadlocks and all"
- "Color Me Beautiful: A Dark Girl Reflects on 'Dark Girls'"
- "Soledad O'Brien: Who is Black in America? I Am"
- "Who's Black, Who's Not, and Who Cares?"
- "One Drop"
- Journal of Pan African Studies (vol. 4, no. 4) [Guest Editor]
- "Editorial: Skin Bleaching and Global White Supremacy"
- Jenda: A Journal of Culture and African Women Studies (no. 14) [Guest Editor]
- "'Ahɔɔfe Kasa!': Skin Bleaching and the Function of Beauty among Ghanaian Women"
- "All the 'Africans' are Men, all the 'Sistas' are 'American,' but Some of Us Resist..."
- "Asamando"
- "Color Symbolism"
- "Cromanti"

Television writing

- Juneteenth: A Global Celebration for Freedom (2022) (co-writer)
