= Rain Dogs (TV series) =

British Television series

- Genre: Black comedy
- Created by: Cash Carraway
- Written by: Cash Carraway
- Directed by: Richard Laxton; Jennifer Perrott
- Starring: Daisy May Cooper; Jack Farthing; Ronkẹ Adékoluẹjo; Fleur Tashjian
- Music by: Alex Baranowski
- Country of origin: United Kingdom
- Original language: English
- No. of series: 1
- No. of episodes: 8

Production
- Executive producers: Cash Carraway; Jo McLellan; Lee Morris; Sally Woodward Gentle
- Producers: Henrietta Colvin; Ciara McIlvenny
- Production locations: Bristol, England; Gloucestershire, England; London, England; Somerset, England
- Cinematography: Carlos Catalán; Wojciech Szepel; Felix Wiedemann
- Running time: 26–29 minutes
- Production companies: BBC Studios; Sid Gentle Films

Original release
- Network: BBC One; HBO
- Release: 6 March – 24 April 2023

Rain Dogs is a British black comedy television series created, written, and executive produced by Cash Carraway for BBC One and HBO. It premiered on HBO on 6 March 2023 and stars Daisy May Cooper, Jack Farthing, Ronkẹ Adékoluẹjo, and Fleur Tashjian. The series has received critical acclaim, with particular praise for the writing and performances of its cast.

== Synopsis ==
An unconventional love story between a working-class single mother, her young daughter, and a privileged gay man.

== Cast and characters ==
- Daisy May Cooper as Costello
- Jack Farthing as Selby
- Ronkẹ Adékoluẹjo as Gloria
- Fleur Tashjian as Iris
- Stephen Wight as Brett
- Adrian Edmondson as Lenny
- Sam Hazeldine as Paul
- Steve Toussaint as the Duke
- Tom Durant-Pritchard as Richard
- Anna Chancellor as Allegra
- Tanya Moodie as Serena
- Karl Pilkington as Simon
- Emily Fairn as Frida

== Episodes ==
No.	Title	Directed by	Written by	Original release date	U.S. viewers (millions)
1	"It's Hard to Be a Saint in the City"	Richard Laxton	Cash Carraway	6 March 2023	N/A
2	"Scenes from a Crucifixion"	Richard Laxton	Cash Carraway	13 March 2023	N/A
3	"The Small World of Florian Selby"	Jennifer Perrott	Cash Carraway	20 March 2023	N/A
4	"Didion Hell"	Jennifer Perrott	Cash Carraway	27 March 2023	N/A
5	"Emotional Erection"	Jennifer Perrott	Cash Carraway	3 April 2023	N/A
6	"Jesus Loves a Hustler"	Jennifer Perrott	Cash Carraway	10 April 2023	N/A
7	"You Just Haven't Earned It Yet, Baby"	Richard Laxton	Cash Carraway	17 April 2023	N/A
8	"This Is Not an Exit"	Richard Laxton	Cash Carraway	24 April 2023	N/A

== Production ==
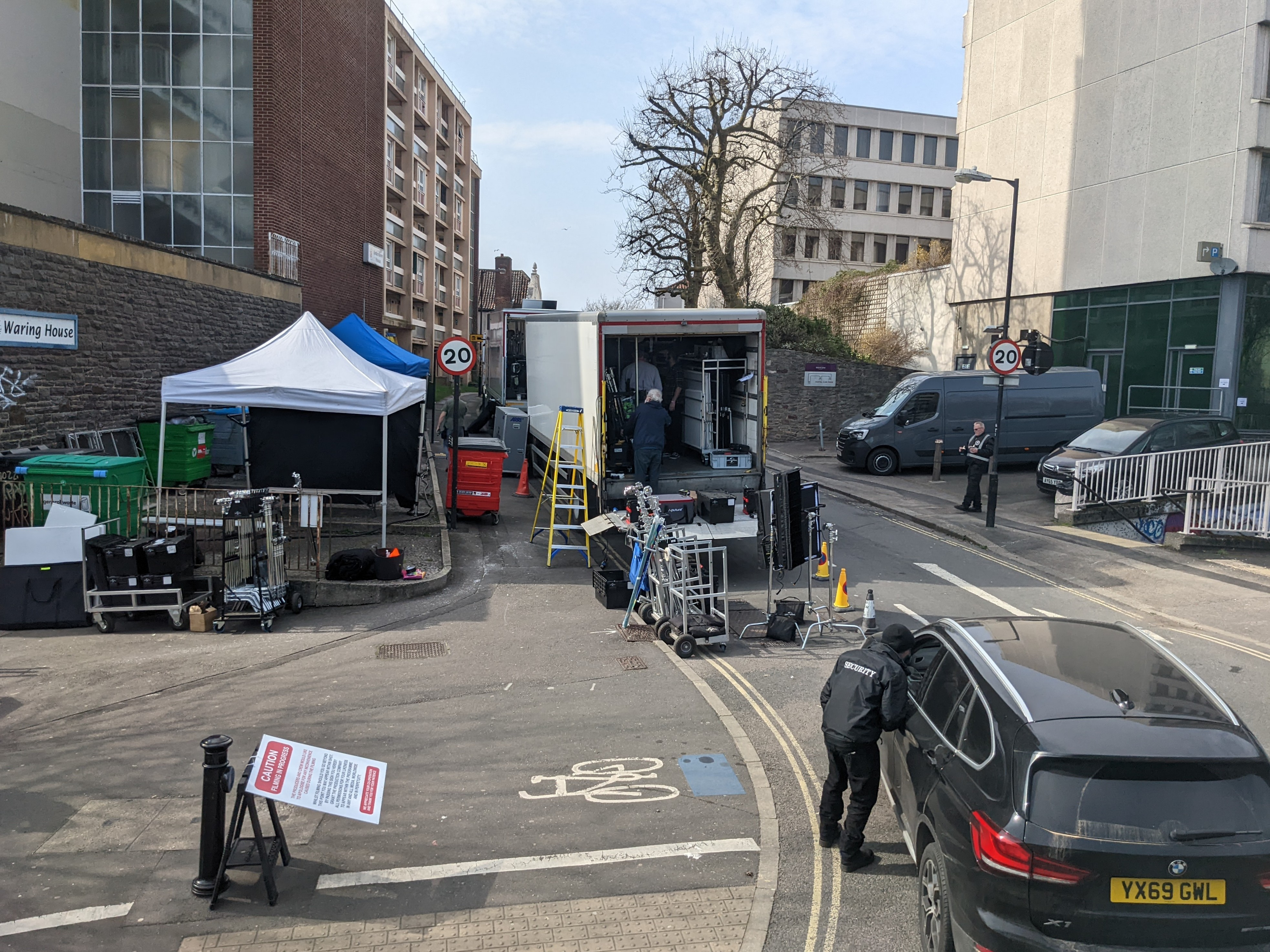
Film crews setting up for filming in Redcliffe, Bristol in March 2022

Rain Dogs is executive produced by Cash Carraway, Lee Morris, Sally Woodward Gentle, and Jo McLellan for BBC One. The series is directed by Richard Laxton and Jennifer Perrott.

== Music ==
Rain Dogs has a soundtrack of power pop and alternative rock classics chosen by the show's creator Cash Carraway.

Some of the songs featured on the show include Nick Lowe's "Cruel to Be Kind", The Replacements' "Little Mascara", Warren Zevon's "Werewolves of London", Caroline Rose's "Soul No. 5", and Justin Townes Earle's "Baby's Got a Bad Idea".

Episode 1 takes its name from Bruce Springsteen's "It's Hard to Be a Saint in the City" and Episode 7 from The Smiths' "You Just Haven't Earned It Yet, Baby".

The lead character Costello Jones is named after Elvis Costello and all of the supporting male roles are named after members of the English rock band Suede.

Showrunner Cash Carraway was originally going to call the series All Shook Down after an album by The Replacements but later changed it to Rain Dogs after Tom Waits' booze-soaked record about "people who sleep in doorways".

== Reception ==
=== Critical response ===
On the review aggregator website Rotten Tomatoes, Rain Dogs holds an approval rating of 93% based on 30 reviews, with an average rating of 8.1/10. The website's critics consensus reads, "Authentically brutal with pinpricks of humor that's all the more true to life, Rain Dogs is a bracing story of toil that proves to be immensely rewarding."

On Metacritic, it has a weighted average rating of 87 out of 100 based on 14 reviews, indicating "universal acclaim". Metacritic ranked Rain Dogs as the number one critically acclaimed new show in the United States for the first half of 2023.

Dan Einav in The Financial Times said that it "plays as both a bruising tragedy…and as an obscene, gallows humour comedy". Alan Sepinwell in Rolling Stone described it as "fascinating, poignant, and at times darkly funny". Sean O'Grady gave it five stars in The Independent and hailed it as "a fine memento of our troubled times". Craig Mathieson of The Sydney Morning Herald awarded it five stars, calling the show "staggering".

=== Accolades ===
Gotham Independent Film Awards 2023 - Breakthrough Series – Under 40 minutes (nomination) Carraway was announced as a BAFTA Breakthrough 2023 for creating, writing, and executive producing Rain Dogs. Farthing was nominated for Best Supporting Performance in a New Scripted Series at the 39th Independent Spirit Awards in February 2024. Adékoluẹjo was nominated for Best Supporting Actress at the Royal Television Society Programme Awards in March 2024. Cooper was nominated for Best Actress at the 2024 Broadcasting Press Guild Awards.
