= Rashid Shabazz =

Professional Bodybuilder and Celebrity Trainer

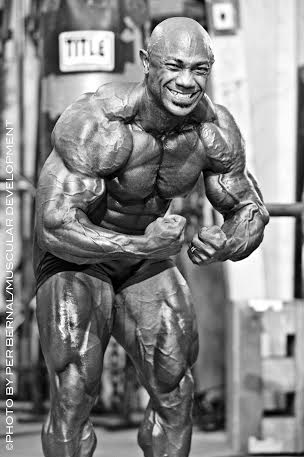
Roc Shabazz after winning 1st place at the 2010 Phoenix Pro in Arizona

Rashid Shabazz, known professionally by the nickname “Roc”, is an American IFBB Pro Champion, celebrity fitness trainer, and business owner.

Best known for his accomplishments in the bodybuilding industry, Roc spent many years under the mentorship of eight-time Mr.Olympia, Lee Haney. He took home 1st place in the 2010 Phoenix Pro in Arizona, and 2nd in the Orlando Europa Pro that same year

== Early life and education ==
The oldest of three boys raised by their mother, Rashid’s formative years were spent in Bay St. Louis, Mississippi. Upon graduating from Bay High School, where he was a letterman in football, baseball, and tennis, Roc attended Jackson State University on a baseball scholarship to further his education.

He graduated from JSU in 1990 with a Bachelor's degree in Business, and was the first in his family to graduate from a 4-year institution. During his college years was also when Roc first found notoriety, having set an, at the time, all-time state record for a 318lb bench-press – when weighing in at only 132lbs (and 5’5) himself.

== Bodybuilding & IFBB career ==
In 1991, Roc moved to Atlanta to study under the tutelage of Lee Haney, who he credits with much of his success. Under his guidance, Roc spent the next six years learning and living the intricacies of competitive bodybuilding. During this time was also when Roc met his longtime training partner Jonathan Rowe. In 1999, he chose to compete in his first local qualifying show, the Eastern Seaboard Bodybuilding Championship, where he took home the titles for Middleweight and Overall Champion.

Desiring to compete at a higher level and earn IFBB Pro Status, Roc participated and placed in multiple National Physique Committee Nationals shows in the Light-Heavyweight Division between 2001 and 2003. He earned his IFBB Pro status in 2004, when he took home the Championship title for the light-heavyweights at the NPC Nationals in Dallas, Texas.

After obtaining Pro Status, Shabazz would go on to compete and place in numerous professional shows between 2006 and 2008, including: the Australian Pro Grand Prix, the San Francisco Grand Prix, the IronMan Pro in Pasadena, the New York Pro, the Europa Supershow in Dallas, and the Tampa Pro in Florida.

== Business endeavors ==
Shabazz became a business owner in 2007 after opening his first fitness facility, Fitness Pros Wellness Center/Fitness Pro2000, in Georgia. His focus was on developing and blending workout regimes with nutritional meal plans to suit the individual, and has also stated a preference for training some clients in groups for the motivational effect. He was named "Chief Fitness Officer" for Shaquille O'Neal, and has trained other professional athletes like Shannon Sharpe, Ray Lewis, and various physique competitors.

In addition to personal training, Roc has worked as a motivational speaker, IFBB special guest, promoter and host, and corporate consultant. He has also been featured in numerous publications, television shows, and radio specials, including FLEX magazine, Muscle & Fitness, Iron Man magazine, Muscular Development, ProSource, and Body Fitness.

Shabazz currently owns and operates ROC Fitness, his fitness and personal training facility in Sandy Springs, GA.

== Personal life ==
Roc met and married his long-time friend, Gina, in Atlanta, Georgia in 1996. Also a fitness trainer and business partner, Gina and Roc share three children together, two daughters and a son, from previous relationships

== Bodybuilding titles ==
YEAR	COMPETITION	CLASS	PLACEMENT
1999	NPC Eastern Seaboard BB Championship, Atlanta	Middleweight/Overall	Champion
2001	NPC Nationals, Atlanta	Middleweight	8th
2002	NPC Nationals, Dallas	Light-Heavyweight	4th
2003	NPC Nationals, Miami	Light-Heavyweight	2nd
2004	NPC Nationals, Dallas	Light-Heavyweight	Champion (earned IFBB Pro status)
2006	Australian Pro Grand Prix, Queensland		8th
2006	San Francisco Grand Prix	Pro Debut	9th
2007	IronMan Pro, Pasadena		13th
2007	Sacramento Pro, California		13th
2008	New York Pro	Open & 202 Class	11th (both)
2008	Europa Supershow, Dallas		2nd
2008	Tampa Pro, Florida	Open & 202 Class	14th (Open) & 5th (202 Class)
2008	Mr. Olympia Showdown, Las Vegas		6th
2010	Phoenix Pro, Arizona	202 Class	1st
2010	Europa Pro, Orlando	202 Class	2nd
2010	Mr. Olympia Showdown, Las Vegas		11th
