= Nadia Manzoor =

British writer, performer, and producer

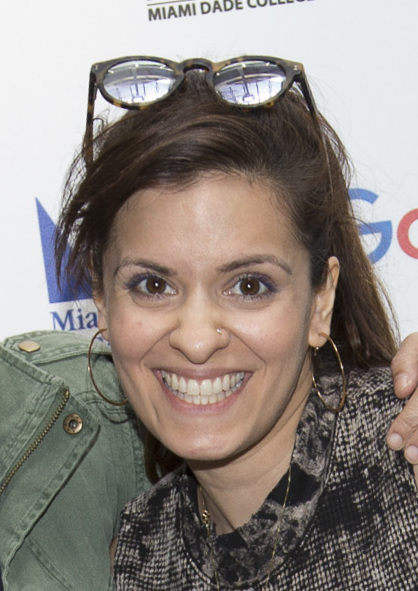
Nadia Manzoor, in 2017.

Nadia Manzoor is a British writer, performer, and producer. She is best known for her autobiographical solo show Burq Off! and for her web series Shugs & Fats.

== Early life ==
Born and raised in Hertfordshire, England to Pakistani parents, she attended St. Albans High School for Girls and Manchester University. She received a Masters in Social Work from Boston University where she began developing an interest in art as activism.

== Career ==
Manzoor moved to New York City in 2011 and began taking improvisation classes with Groundlings based improv school Improvolution and teaching performing arts curriculum to marginalized teens with the Hetrick-Martin Institute.

=== Burq Off! ===
In December 2013, Manzoor's autobiographical solo show Burq Off! premiered in New York City. Manzoor is the writer and performer of the show, which sold out its first run and went on tour to sold out audiences in LA, San Francisco, London, Toronto, Vancouver, and Seoul. Burq Off! is a one woman comedy about growing up in a conservative Muslim home in London, and explores themes of sex, religion, culture, truth and family. In it, Manzoor portrays over twenty-one characters. She has spoken about the show in interviews with Christiane Amanpour, Deepak Chopra, and Jane Garvey among others.

=== Shugs & Fats ===
Manzoor is the creator of comedy web-series Shugs & Fats with comedian Radhika Vaz. Shugs & Fats is a buddy comedy about two hijabis exploring their freedom as recent immigrants to Brooklyn. Manzoor and Vaz were named among the 25 New Faces in Independent Film in 2016 by Filmmaker Magazine. Shugs & Fats has had screenings at Tribeca Film Festival, Miami Film Festival, and Tacoma Film Festival.

The series won a Gotham Award in 2015 and as of 2017 was in development with Joey Soloway and Amazon Studios.
