= Afronauts (Zambian theater production) =

Afronauts is a theater performance by Circus Zambia that tells the story of a 1964 drive to send a Zambian rocket — containing two cats as well as an astronaut — into space. The show combines aerials, juggling and acrobatics.

A version of the performance, in collaboration with UK-based theater company Wake the Beast, was the first Zambian production at the Edinburgh Festival Fringe when it was performed in 2026.

== History ==
Circus Zambia began working on the show in 2016 and was scheduled to bring it to the 2020 Edinburgh Festival Fringe, a plan which was disrupted by COVID.
