= Edward Mukuka Nkoloso =

Zambian resistance member (1919–1989)

- Born: Edward Festus Mukuka Nkoloso; 1919; Northern Rhodesia
- Died: 4 March 1989 (aged 69–70)
- Education: University of Zambia
- Occupations: Director, national academy of science Resistance member
- Awards: Jubilee Medal "Forty Years of Victory in the Great Patriotic War 1941–1945" (1984)
- Space career
- Previous occupation: Resistance member, teacher
- Rank: Colonel
- Retired: 1972

Edward Festus Mukuka Nkoloso (1919 – 4 March 1989) was a member of the Zambian resistance movement and the founder of the Zambia National Academy of Science, Space Research and Philosophy. He was especially famous for attempting a space programme and its "Afronauts" have been the subject of subsequent art works and documentaries.

== Life ==
Nkoloso was born in 1919, in the northern part of Northern Rhodesia. Some sources refer to him as "Edward Makuka Nkoloso".

He was drafted into the Northern Rhodesia Regiment in World War II, ultimately serving as a sergeant in the signal corp. After the war, he became a translator for the Northern Rhodesian government. He was also a grade school teacher, and opened a new school, which was purportedly shut down by British authorities. He then joined the resistance movement. He was arrested and imprisoned in 1956 and 1957. Following his release, he was appointed as security official of United National Independence Party. In 1960, he founded the Zambia National Academy of Science, Space Research and Philosophy. In 1964, he participated in the Constitutional Convention.

== Space program ==
From 1960 until sometime after 1969, Nkoloso's "space program" sought to accomplish the launching of a rocket that would send 17-year-old Matha Mwambwa and two cats to the Moon. There were also plans for a trip to Mars. Nkoloso hoped to beat the United States and Soviet Union's respective space programs at the height of the Space Race.

To train the "Afronauts" (astronauts), Nkoloso set up a makeshift facility on an abandoned farm 11 kilometres (7 mi) from Lusaka, where the trainees would be rolled down a rough hill in a 200-litre (55 US gal, 44 imp gal) oil drum. This, according to Nkoloso, would train them in the feeling of weightlessness in both space travel and re-entry. In addition, they used a tire swing to simulate weightlessness.

The term "Afronauts", coined by Nkoloso in 1957, refers to the participants of this program with hopes of bringing not just Zambia, but also the entire continent of Africa, to space.

Nkoloso stated that the goals of the program were to establish a Christian ministry to "primitive" Martians and the hope of Zambia becoming the "controllers of the seventh heaven of interstellar space". However, he reportedly instructed the missionary in the space program not to force Christianity onto native Martians.

The rocket, named D-Kalu 1 after President Kenneth Kaunda, was a 3-metre by 2-metre (10×6 ft) drum-shaped vessel. Nkoloso claimed that it was made of "space-worthy" aluminium and copper. The planned launch date was on Independence Day, 24 October 1964 and would take place from the Independence Stadium, but the launch was purportedly denied permission due to being inappropriate.

It is said that he then asked UNESCO for a grant of £7,000,000 in Zambian pounds to support his space program. It is also said he requested $1.9 billion from "private foreign sources". However, the Ministry of Power, Transport and Communication is reported as stating those requests had not been made on the behalf of Zambia.

Interviewed in 2016, President Kenneth Kaunda said of the space program that "It wasn't a real thing ... It was more for fun than anything else."

== Aftermath ==
Nkoloso stated the program failed due to lack of funds, the pregnancy of astronaut Matha Mwambwa and her subsequently leaving the program to return to her parents, and problems with morale due to media attention. The rocket was claimed to have been sabotaged "by foreign elements". The Zambian government distanced itself from Nkoloso's endeavour.

A photograph book Afronauts commemorating the events was self-published by Cristina De Middel in 2012. The short independent film titled Afronauts directed by Nuotama Bodomo was premiered at the Sundance Film Festival in 2014.

== Later life ==
Nkoloso unsuccessfully ran for mayor of Lusaka, Zambia, emphasising scientific advancement. He was appointed by President Kaunda to the Liberation Center, a movement for regional freedom. He championed government support for witch doctors on at least one occasion. He claimed that they should have a place beside physicians, and that they are an antidote for Christianity which had hurt Africa's medical skills, but states that he did not practice witchcraft himself. He retired in 1972.

He received a law degree from the University of Zambia in 1983. He was awarded the Soviet Jubilee Medal "Forty Years of Victory in the Great Patriotic War 1941–1945". He also served as president of the Ndola Ex-servicemen's Association and was made an honorary army colonel. Nkoloso died on 4 March 1989, and was buried with presidential honours.

== Popular culture ==
In 2014 Nkoloso was depicted in the film Nkoloso the Afronaut that was nominated at the 2014 Uganda Film Festival. He and Matha also appear as characters in Namwali Serpell's novel The Old Drift, published in 2019.
