= Cash Carraway =

British-Irish writer

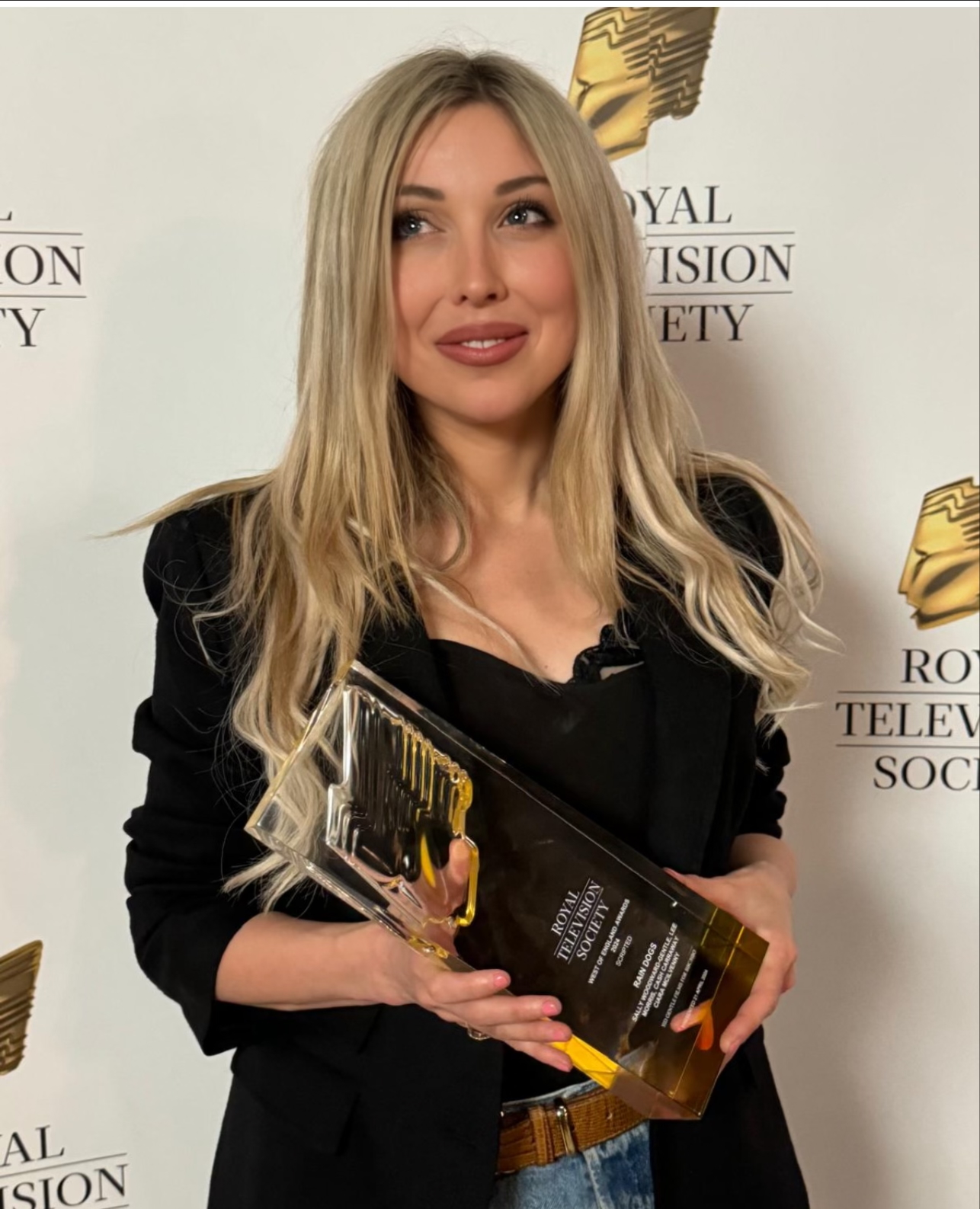
- Carraway at the 2024 Royal Television Society Awards 2024 with her award for Best Scripted Drama for Rain Dogs
- Born: Camberwell, London, England
- Education: University College London
- Occupation: Writer
- Notable work: Rain Dogs, Skint Estate

Cash Carraway (born January 1981) is an Irish-English screenwriter, director, and executive producer best known for creating and writing the HBO series, Rain Dogs for which she was nominated for a Gotham Award and won a BAFTA Breakthrough.

== Early life ==
Cash Carraway was born in Camberwell, London, to Irish Catholic parents from Lettermore, County Galway, and was educated at Carshalton High School for Girls and the BRIT School. She has a degree in English from University College London.

== Career ==
Cash Carraway is the creator, writer, and showrunner of the HBO/BBC comedy drama Rain Dogs.

In 2019 Penguin Books published Carraway's debut book Skint Estate. It was met with critical acclaim and The Times called her "The new voice of a generation."

The British Comedy Guide announced three new Carraway projects. A sitcom titled Big Shot for Boffola Pictures, a comedy drama called Reserve List for Objective Fiction, and a feature film with Playground Entertainment.

== Accolades ==
She was nominated for a Gotham Independent Film Award for Breakthrough Series. Carraway was awarded a place on the 2023 BAFTA Breakthrough list.

Rain Dogs won a Royal Television Society Award for Best Scripted.

Her writing is often compared to Hubert Selby Jr. and Charles Bukowski. Time described Carraway's writing style as "Raunchy gallows humour. And she's genius at it."

== Influences ==
Her artistic influences include the cinematic works of Paul Schrader and Jean-Luc Godard as well as the satirist Chris Morris and screenwriter John Sullivan.

== Personal life ==
She resides in Highgate, North London and Los Angeles.

== Published works ==
=== Plays ===
- The Last Peepshow in Soho (Soho Theatre)
- The French Inhaler (Clean Break)
- Refuge Woman (Battersea Arts Centre)

=== Books ===
- Skint Estate: Notes from the Poverty Line (2019; Penguin Random House)
- La Porca Miseria (2023; Alegre)

=== TV ===
- Rain Dogs (BBC/HBO) – creator, writer, executive producer
