= List of Ghanaian filmmakers =

This is a list of notable Ghanaian filmmakers listed in alphabetic order by surname.

== A ==
- Kofi Adu
- John Akomfrah
- King Ampaw
- Kwaw Ansah
- John Apea
- Juliet Asante
- Nana Adwoa Awindor
- Nana Oforiatta Ayim

== B ==
- Akosua Busia

== D ==
- Leila Djansi

== F ==
- Shirley Frimpong-Manso

== G ==
- Charles Allen Gyimah

== H ==
- Rev Dr Chris Tsui Hesse

== O ==
- Nii Kwate Owoo
- Akosua Adoma Owusu

== S ==
- Socrate Safo
