= United States Artists =

Non-profit arts funding organization in the U.S.

- Founded: 2005
- Type: Philanthropic arts organization
- Purpose: American artists
- Location: Chicago, Illinois
- Region served: United States
- Product: USA Projects – crowdfunding platform
- Method: Awards unrestricted grants of $50,000 to 50 artists per annum
- Key people: Judilee Reed, President & CEO Katharine DeShaw, Founding CEO
- Endowment: Initial seed funding of (US) $22.6M provided by Ford Foundation, Rockefeller Foundation, Prudential Foundation, and Rasmuson Foundation
- Website: unitedstatesartists.org

United States Artists (USA) is a national arts funding organization based in Chicago. USA is dedicated to supporting living artists and cultural practitioners across the United States by granting unrestricted awards.

== Mission ==
The organization's stated mission is "Believe in Artists". In addition, the organization asserts that "USA Fellowships honor and award an artist's unique vision as a whole rather than funding a particular project. Artists at different career levels, from emerging to established, are eligible."

== Awards & Programs ==
=== USA Fellowships ===
USA Fellowships are annual $50,000 unrestricted awards recognizing the most compelling artists working and living in the United States at every stage of their career. Grants are awarded annually to artists working in ten disciplines:

- Architecture & Design
- Craft
- Dance
- Film
- Media
- Music
- Theater & Performance
- Traditional Arts
- Visual Art
- Writing

=== Berresford Prize ===
Established in 2019, The Berresford Prize is an unrestricted $50,000 award given annually to a cultural practitioner who has contributed significantly to the advancement, well-being, and care of artists in society. Awardees to date include Beth Boone, Maori Karmael Holmes, Louise Erdrich, Lulani Arquette, Roberto Bedoya, Linda Goode Bryant and Kristy Edmunds.

== Selection process ==
Every year, a geographically diverse group of nominators consist of scholars, critics, arts administrators, producers, curators, artists, field experts, and other cultural professionals are asked to nominate those they think deserve the USA fellowship. Then, the nominees are invited to submit applications with work samples, which are reviewed by a selected groups of discipline-specific panels composed of artists, curators, historians, experts, academics, and producers. After the panels select the finalists, the Board of Trustees go over the finalists together and approve.

== Artist Relief ==
To support artists during the COVID-19 pandemic, USA and a group of national arts grant makers created an emergency fund to offer financial aid and useful informational resources for artist across the country.
