= Terence Nance =

American filmmaker

- Born: Dallas, Texas, U.S.
- Education: New York University
- Occupations: Filmmaker; writer; director; actor; musician
- Years active: 2007–present
- Website: https://terencenance.com/

Terence Nance is artist, musician, and filmmaker born in Dallas, Texas in what was then referred to as the State-Thomas community. He is best known for his directing debut An Oversimplification of Her Beauty, and as the creator of the avant-garde TV program Random Acts of Flyness, which is produced by his production company MVMT for HBO and streams on HBO Max.

== Early life ==
Nance was born in Dallas, Texas. He earned his MFA from New York University where he studied visual art.

== Career ==
Nance wrote, directed, scored, and starred in his first feature film, An Oversimplification of Her Beauty, which incorporates an earlier short film, How Would You Feel?, animation and an original score by Nance and Flying Lotus. It premiered in the Sundance Film Festival's New Frontier section in 2012 and was also screened as part of the 2012 New Directors/New Films Festival in New York. Scholar Terri Francis has described it as "...an experimental film...that recreates the unspoken space amid friendship and relationships. Starring Terence Nance himself and the girl with whom he is caught up in this difficult dance, the film shifts between reconstruction and reimagining using both animation and live action." The film was also featured at a screening as part of the Afrofuturist Film Festival at the New School on 3 May 2015.

An Oversimplification of Her Beauty, which premiered at the 2012 Sundance Film Festival and was released theatrically in 2013. In the years following Nance was chosen as one of the 25 new faces of independent film, awarded the Guggenheim fellowship and the United States Artists (USA) Award for his multidisciplinary creative practice.

In the summer of 2018, Terence’s Peabody Award-winning television series Random Acts of Flyness debuted on HBO to critical acclaim. The New York Times hailed the show as “hypnotic, transporting and un-categorizable” adding that, "it’s trying to disrupt and re-disrupt your perceptions so that, finally, you can see."

In September 2018, Nance was announced as the director of the sequel to Space Jam, produced by Ryan Coogler. On July 16, 2019, Nance was informed he would be replaced as director of Space Jam: A New Legacy, though he retained both screenwriting and executive producing credits.

In 2020, Nance (under the name Terence Etc.) released his first EP, THINGS I NEVER HAD followed in 2022 by his debut album V O R T E X on Flying Lotus’ Brainfeeder Label. Most recently he collaborated on film and TV projects with TELFAR, Rage Against the Machine, Earl Sweatshirt, and a feature length film experience with Andre 3000 for his debut solo album New Blue Sun. This was followed by his first feature length score for Tayarisha Poe’s The Young Wife starring Sheryl Lee Ralph, Kiersey Clemens and Leon Bridges.

In 2023, Nance collaborated with Blackstar Projects on his first solo museum show, SWARM at the Institute of Contemporary Art in Philadelphia. The show featured immersive video installations.

The exhibition opened on the heels of season 2 of Random Acts of Flyness, subtitled The Parable of the Pirate and the King. Richard Brody of The New Yorker described season 2 as “a work of music-like Afrofuturism, the closest thing I’ve seen to a cinematic reflection of the tones and moods of the music of Sun Ra, complete with the mythopoetic dimension.”

== Filmography ==
=== Film ===
Year	Title	Director	Writer	Producer	Actor	Role	Notes
2009	No Ward	Yes		Yes			Documentary
2012	An Oversimplification of Her Beauty	Yes	Yes	Yes	Yes	Himself	Also editor and animator
2016	Women Who Kill				Yes	Darren	
2018	The Burial of Kojo			Yes			
2021	Space Jam: A New Legacy		Yes	Executive			Replaced as director by Malcolm D. Lee

=== Short films ===
Year	Title	Director	Writer	Producer	Actor	Role	Notes
2010	How Would You Feel?	Yes	Yes	Yes			
2011	Native Sun	Yes		Yes			
2015	Swimming in Your Skin Again	Yes		Yes			
2016	Univitellin	Yes	Yes	Yes			
2016	They Charge for the Sun	Yes	Yes				
2017	The Paris Project			Co-producer	Yes	Michael Wynton	
2018	Piu Piu			Executive	Yes	Himself	
2018	Nowhere, Nobody	Yes	Yes				Co-directed with Naima Ramos-Chapman

=== Television ===
Year	Title	Director	Writer	Executive Producer	Actor	Role	Notes
2015–17	The Show About the Show				Yes	Tony	
2017	Lost & Found				Yes	Jonathan	
2018–2022	Random Acts of Flyness	Yes	Yes	Yes	Yes	Himself	Also creator, composer and editor

== Discography ==
- Things I Never Had (2020)
- V O R T E X (2022)

== Accolades ==
Year	Ceremony	Category	Result
2014	Guggenheim Fellowship	Creative Arts	Recipient
2018	United States Artists (USA) Fellowship	Film	Recipient
