= You season 5 =

You
- Season 5
- Promotional poster
- Showrunners: Michael Foley; Justin W. Lo
- Starring: Penn Badgley; Charlotte Ritchie; Griffin Matthews; Anna Camp; Madeline Brewer
- No. of episodes: 10

Release
- Original network: Netflix
- Original release: April 24, 2025

Season chronology
- ← Previous; Season 4

The fifth and final season of the American psychological thriller television series You was ordered by Netflix on March 24, 2023. You series co-creator Sera Gamble left as showrunner and was replaced by Michael Foley and Justin W. Lo. Series star Penn Badgley returns as Joe Goldberg, with Charlotte Ritchie returning from the previous season; and Griffin Matthews, Anna Camp and Madeline Brewer joining the main cast. Filming began in March 2024 and ended that August.

The ten-episode season was released on April 24, 2025.

== Premise ==
Joe Goldberg returns to New York City to live a peaceful life, but the appearance of a woman, Bronte, and the need to satisfy his darkest needs will put his entire life in danger.

== Cast ==
=== Main ===
- Penn Badgley as Joe Goldberg, a now-rich serial killer who returns to New York
- Charlotte Ritchie as Kate Lockwood-Goldberg (formerly Galvin), Joe's English wife and the CEO of T.R. Lockwood Corporation
- Griffin Matthews as Teddy Lockwood, Joe's snarky yet loyal brother-in-law, who was never fully accepted by the Lockwood family
- Anna Camp in dual roles as:
  - Reagan Lockwood, a cutthroat CFO of T.R. Lockwood Corporation who has her eyes on the throne
  - Maddie Lockwood, a thrice-divorced socialite whose job is "vaguely PR" and a master manipulator
- Madeline Brewer as Louise Flannery / Bronte, an enigmatic and free-spirited playwright who comes to work for Joe

=== Recurring ===
- Frankie DeMaio as Henry Goldberg, Joe and Love Quinn's son
- Pete Ploszek as Harrison Jacobs, a former pro-football player, husband to Reagan Lockwood and Joe's brother-in-law
- Tom Francis as Clayton Angevine, Dr. Nicky's son who wants revenge on Joe for framing his father
- Natasha Behnam as Dominique, a friend of Clayton and Bronte's who assists them in their attempt to get revenge on Joe
- Amy-Leigh Hickman as Nadia Fareedi, a former student of Joe's who is in prison because of a crime committed by him

=== Guest ===
- Michael Dempsey as Buffalo Bob Cain, a close family friend to the Lockwoods and Kate's mentor
- Michelle Hurd as Dr. Val, Henry's school psychologist
- b as Phoenix, Bronte and Dominique's friend
- Elizabeth Lail as Guinevere Beck, Joe's late girlfriend
- Nava Mau as Marquez, a detective
- Saffron Burrows as Dottie Quinn, mother of Joe's late wife Love
- Zach Cherry as Ethan Russell, Joe's former employee at Mooney's
- Kathryn Gallagher as Annika Atwater, who blames Joe for her friend Peach Salinger's death
- Shalita Grant as Sherry Conrad, wife of Cary, and Joe and Love's former friend from Madre Linda
- Luca Padovan as Paco, Joe's former neighbor
- Travis Van Winkle as Cary Conrad, husband of Sherry, and Joe and Love's former friend from Madre Linda
- Cayleb Long as Clyde Beck, Beck's brother
- Jefferson White as Dane Robinson, a man who tries to kidnap Bronte
- Tilly Keeper as Lady Phoebe Borehall-Blaxworth, Joe's friend from London
- Tati Gabrielle as Marienne Bellamy, a former love interest of Joe's
- Robin Lord Taylor as Will Bettleheim, Joe's friend living in the Philippines

== Episodes ==
No. overall	No. in season	Title	Directed by	Written by	Original release date
41	1	"The Luckiest Guy in NY"	Marcos Siega	Michael Foley & Hillary Benefiel	April 24, 2025
Three years after returning to New York, Joe Goldberg has become famous due to his relationship with Kate, has his son Henry back, and has put Mooney's up for sale. Joe learns from Kate's paternal half-brother Teddy that a hit piece is going to be published about an old business deal Kate made, which would ruin her reputation. Teddy and Joe confront Reagan Lockwood, Kate's paternal half-sister, who denies involvement in the hit piece. Going through Reagan's identical twin sister Maddie's phone, Joe discovers that Reagan, Maddie, and Kate's mentor Bob are planning a vote of no confidence against Kate. Joe later fantasizes about murdering Bob and is caught writing about it by Kate at Mooney's. While leaving, he meets Bronte, who had been borrowing books from his shop. When Kate confronts Bob, he confirms he leaked the information to the press and reveals he knows about Kate's involvement in covering Rhys Montrose's death. Joe murders Bob and stages his suicide later that night. Upon visiting Mooney's again, Joe discovers Bronte sleeping there and offers her a job. Later, Joe goes to his basement, where he has reassembled his glass cage.
42	2	"Blood Will Have Blood"	Marcos Siega	Justin W. Lo & Kelli Breslin	April 24, 2025
Henry is suspended from school after assaulting Reagan's daughter, Gretchen. Kate arranges a dinner with Reagan to discuss the matter; Reagan brings Maddie to corner Kate, and Kate brings Teddy. At the dinner party, Reagan demands an apology from Joe and Kate. When Reagan accuses Kate of orchestrating Bob's murder, Teddy refutes her accusation by claiming he saw security footage of Bob's suicide. After overhearing Reagan disparaging his family, Henry throws a table knife at her. Reagan vows to find Kate's darkest secrets and oust her from her position as CEO. Joe proposes to Kate to kill Reagan, but she vehemently opposes the idea. Unbeknownst to Kate, Joe sneaks into Reagan's office one night, knocks her unconscious and leaves her husband Harrison trapped while they were about to have sex. Joe opens up to Henry about his mother, Love Quinn. Kate questions Joe's motives for killing. Reagan informs Kate that she will press charges against Henry, and Joe discovers that he actually locked up Maddie.
43	3	"Impostor Syndrome"	Pete Chatmon	Neil Reynolds & Maren Caldwell	April 24, 2025
Joe intends to let Maddie out of her cage, but she is uncooperative. Joe feels increasingly alienated by Kate. Joe rehires Bronte. He and Bronte then go book shopping and begin to grow closer. Bronte takes Joe to an underground literary scene and she reunites with her ex-boyfriend Clayton, who berates her, and ridicules her by reading an old erotic poem of hers. Bronte tries to defend herself, but Clayton reveals her original name and where she is originally from. Kate goes to Reagan's house to tell her she knows about her embezzlement, but Reagan is devastated by Harrison's infidelity, and they both agree to put the children aside. Joe comforts a devastated Bronte, and they flirt. Joe begins to obsess over Bronte. At home, Kate tells Joe she wants his help short of killing people. Later, Joe and Kate watch a live broadcast of Reagan posing as Maddie, in which "Maddie" gives up her board vote to Reagan in an attempt to remove Kate. Joe suggests that Maddie pretend to be Reagan and take her down.
44	4	"My Fair Maddie"	So Yong Kim	Kara Lee Corthron & Dylan Cohen	April 24, 2025
Joe attempts to get Maddie to act like Reagan, but makes little progress; after a conversation with Bronte, Joe finds inspiration for Maddie. Kate meets with Reagan to demand that she resign or she will go public with her embezzlement. Reagan counterattacks by revealing that she has discovered that Joe killed Montrose and Bob, and forces her to resign or she will expose them. Kate reveals this to Joe, and he insists that Reagan must die. Kate confesses that she wanted her dead and that she knows of her own darkness, but rejects that in both of them. Determined to kill Reagan, Joe goes to her house, where a fight ensues between the two until Joe knocks her out. Bronte discovers Joe's writings about his passion for her. Joe locks Reagan in the cage and tells Maddie to kill her so she can get out. During the bookstore's reopening, Clayton again harasses Bronte, and Joe threatens him. Maddie kills Reagan after a heated argument. Maddie, posing as Reagan, resigns from her position. When Kate does not thank him, Joe believes their marriage is broken; later, Joe and Bronte have sex.
45	5	"Last Dance"	Maggie Carey	Amanda Johnson-Zetterström	April 24, 2025
Kate investigates Joe and learns about his affair with Bronte and Marienne's disappearance, and suspects that he killed Love. While having sex with Bronte, Joe is called by Maddie, who is struggling to keep pretending to be Reagan, but Joe promises to cover up Reagan's murder. Joe later finds a note from Bronte at Mooney's saying she has left town. That night, Joe finds a hunting knife in his and Kate's bed and confronts her about it, whereupon she admonishes him for trying to play the victim and gaslighting her, before announcing she is divorcing him. Joe then breaks into Clayton's apartment where he receives a call from Bronte, and tracks her down to a beach house in Atlantic Beach. Maddie breaks down and admits to Kate that Joe forced her to kill Reagan. After Joe and Bronte have sex, he hears Clayton arguing with Bronte and attacks and kills him. However, Clayton's friends Dominique and Phoenix come in and announce that they have recorded Joe killing him on a livestream, and that Bronte is also a part of the ruse to take down Joe.
46	6	"The Dark Face of Love"	Gaby Dellal	Hillary Benefiel	April 24, 2025
Joe is arrested for killing Clayton, but Kate's lawyers bail him out of jail. Bronte tells a detective that she was a student and friend of Guinevere Beck. In one of her classes, Bronte tells Beck that she must discontinue her education to go home and take care of her sick mother. Soon Bronte discovers that Beck has been murdered, but does not believe the theory that Dr. Nicky was the killer, and searches for the truth. Bronte joins an online group that wants to take down Joe. Along with Bronte, Dominique, Phoenix and Dr. Nicky's son Clayton investigate Joe for years until his apparent death. But when they discover that Joe is alive and famous, they all decide to go to New York. Bronte meets Joe and considers making him fall in love with her to catch him, but soon begins having feelings for him. Bronte goes to Atlantic Beach to leave Joe, but he follows her. Clayton discovers this and begins to attack her for not sticking to their plan. Joe sees this and kills Clayton. Because of her feelings towards Joe, Bronte claims Joe killed Clayton in self-defense. Joe, back home, discovers that Kate tricked him into signing custody papers when he was bailed out of jail, and that if he tries anything, he will lose everything. Joe plans to get Henry back.
47	7	"#JoeGoldberg"	Erica Dunton	Leo Richardson	April 24, 2025
After the video of Joe killing Clayton is released, Joe becomes the center of attention throughout New York. Joe tries to get Henry back with a lawyer, but the lawyer tells Joe it will take time. Kate asks Teddy to take Henry so Joe cannot find him, but Joe gives Henry a book with a locator attached to it. Bronte abandons Dominique and her plan to stop Joe, claiming he saved her. Joe locates Henry, who is being watched by Teddy. They struggle with each other until Henry shows up. Teddy calls 911, and Joe is taken out of the house by bodyguards. Dominique and Phoenix expose more of Joe's possible murders, and social media fills with people from his past. Joe blackmails Maddie into helping him rehabilitate his image, threatening to release the video of her killing Reagan. Maddie arranges an interview for Joe with a journalist to redeem his image, but Joe breaks down in tears when talking about his childhood. After Bronte texts Joe saying she told the police that he was protecting her, Joe claims that what he did was out of love, and people begin to rally around him, while Bronte becomes the target of online misogyny. Kate travels to London and visits Nadia Farran in prison. When Bronte is about to be kidnapped, Joe knocks out the kidnapper.
48	8	"Folie a Deux"	Cheryl Dunye	Kelli Breslin	April 24, 2025
Bronte and Joe reconcile over what happened and give each other another chance. Joe later takes Bronte to the cage in the bookstore where he has locked up her kidnapper, Dane, and tells her he will do whatever she says. In prison, Nadia berates Kate for framing her to save Joe, and Kate discovers from her that Joe was also the Eat-the-Rich Killer that killed her friends. Maddie calls Joe because Harrison has discovered she is not Reagan. He leaves to see them, leaving Bronte with Dane. Maddie and Joe try in various ways to keep Harrison quiet, but Harrison proves to be difficult. When Joe is about to kill Harrison, he sees Maddie and Harrison reconciling, and Harrison promises not to say anything. Bronte decides to let Dane go free, but under their control. In the cage, Joe tells Bronte that he needs to kill, but she tells him that is not the case and that knowing he wants to protect her is enough. Joe ends up finding and killing Dane, despite what Bronte told him. Joe and Kate have a tense phone conversation, after which Kate decides Joe must die.
49	9	"Trial of the Furies"	Marcos Siega	Justin W. Lo & Hillary Benefiel	April 24, 2025
Joe frames Harrison for killing Reagan, while Maddie is arrested for covering for him and posing as her sister. While out with Bronte planning to start a new life with her, Joe discovers that Kate has drained his bank account and taken his apartment and bookstore, so Joe decides he must kill Kate. Joe follows Kate to a parking lot, but discovers it is a trap and is sedated. Joe wakes up in his cage and discovers that Kate and Nadia are working together; Nadia and Kate tell him to confess his crimes and they will let him go. Nadia and Kate bring in Marienne, revealing to Joe that she is alive. Joe discovers from Marienne that they will kill him regardless of what he does in the cage. Marienne runs into Bronte, and has a conversation with her about how Joe is actually the bad guy. Kate decides to kill Joe alone, but Joe breaks free from the cage via a spare key that was embedded in his arm and shoots her. Maddie locks Joe in the basement and sets fire to the bookstore. Kate eventually wakes up and knocks out Joe. Joe and Kate have a heart-to-heart, where Kate successfully records Joe's confession to his prior crimes. Kate passes out and Joe is rescued by Bronte before the fire can consume them. Joe proposes to Bronte, and she accepts in order to stop him.
50	10	"Finale"	Lee Toland Krieger	Michael Foley & Neil Reynolds	April 24, 2025
Joe and Bronte begin to go on the run after Kate's recorded confession of Joe's crimes; Bronte debating when to corner Joe. Joe plans to cross the border into Canada under a false identity provided by Will Bettleheim, including Henry in his plans. Joe and Bronte break into a vacation house for a night until they get the papers. The two take a romantic boat ride, and while they are about to have sex, Bronte points a gun at Joe and demands to know how he killed Beck, but he will not tell her. Bronte then forces Joe to identify his contributions to Beck's posthumous bestselling book, using a copy she bought at a gas station earlier. Joe manages to contact Henry through Will, but Henry disowns him and calls him a monster. Bronte calls 911 before Joe seemingly drowns her, and then police show up. Joe kills a police officer while trying to escape, but is then cornered by still-alive Bronte. Bronte shoots Joe in the genitals, and he is arrested. Joe is sentenced to life in prison; Bronte rewrites Beck's book, removing Joe's additions; Kate, who survived the fire, leaves the company–which becomes fully non-profit under Teddy–and helps Marienne with her art and raises Henry; Nadia leaves prison and becomes a writing teacher. Joe, in prison, reads fan mail, thinking he is not the problem; society is.

== Production ==
=== Development ===
On March 24, 2023, You was renewed by Netflix for a fifth and final season. Series co-creator Sera Gamble left as showrunner and was replaced by Michael Foley and Justin W. Lo.

=== Casting ===
Series star Penn Badgley returns as Joe Goldberg while Madeline Brewer joins the series as Bronte. Anna Camp plays dual roles as Reagan and Maddie Lockwood, with Griffin Matthews as Teddy Lockwood. Charlotte Ritchie returns from the fourth season as Kate Galvin, and child actor Frankie DeMaio joins the series as Joe's son Henry. Tati Gabrielle also returns from the third and fourth seasons as Marienne Bellamy. In mid-May, Natasha Behnam, Pete Ploszek, Tom Francis and b were announced as recurring guest stars. In late July, Nava Mau was announced to guest star as Marquez. A trailer released on March 10, 2025, confirmed the return of Amy-Leigh Hickman from the fourth season, and Kathryn Gallagher from the first.

=== Filming ===
Filming began in late March 2024 in New York City, and concluded in mid-August 2024.

== Release ==
The season, consisting of ten episodes, was released in its entirety on Netflix on April 24, 2025. It was initially scheduled to premiere in 2024, but was delayed due to the 2023 Writers Guild of America and SAG-AFTRA strikes.

== Reception ==
On the review aggregator Rotten Tomatoes, 84% of 37 critic reviews are positive and the average rating is 6.8 out of 10. The website's critics consensus reads, "You wisely wraps things up just before Joe Goldberg's murderous machinations become stale, delivering a final season that ought to satisfy most viewers' morbid curiosity." Metacritic, which uses a weighted average, assigned the series a score of 53 out of 100, based on 12 critics, indicating "mixed or average" reviews.

Rebecca Nicholson from The Guardian was largely critical of the season, seeing it as a weak conclusion to what was once a fun and self-aware thriller. She criticized the show for stretching its premise over five seasons, losing its satirical edge and becoming repetitive and contrived, and how it handles its central character, questioning whether the show views him as a hero or a villain. The final season is described as plodding, overly convoluted, and ultimately disappointing, with an ending that Nicholson found borderline insulting to the audience. She praised fan-pleasing cameos, a mid-season twist that provides some momentum, and moments where the show's dark humor resurfaces, particularly in its critique of the ultra-rich. While Nicholas Quah of Vulture found some aspects of the finale amusing and fitting, he expressed disappointment in the show's handling of Joe's arc, arguing that his eventual punishment—castration followed by life in prison—is symbolic but ultimately insufficient given the character's multi-season evolution. Quah thought that Joe's self-mythologizing is central to his villainy, making his downfall feel somewhat abrupt and lacking deeper reckoning. Overall, he praised Badgley's performance and acknowledged the entertainment value of the series, but criticized how it struggles with making Joe both a protagonist and a figure of deconstruction. Quah also pointed out broader cultural themes surrounding justice, gender dynamics, and the depiction of violent men.
