= List of You characters =

List of characters in the You series and novels

You is an American psychological thriller novel series, written by Caroline Kepnes, and television series, developed by Greg Berlanti and Sera Gamble, following bookshop owner Joe Goldberg in a satire of romantic comedies, as he struggles to overcome his homicidal tendencies while searching for true love. For the latter's first season, it aired on Lifetime, moving to Netflix from its second season onward. The novel series consists of You (2013), Hidden Bodies (2016), You Love Me (2021), and For You and You Only (2023).

The following is a list of characters that have appeared in the novel and television series.

== Overview ==
Key
Main cast (credited)
Recurring cast (3 or more episodes)
Guest cast (1–2 episodes)

=== Main cast ===
| Actor | Character | Season | | | | |
| Actor | Character | 1 | 2 | 3 | 4 | 5 |
|---|---|---|---|---|---|---|
| Penn Badgley | Joe Goldberg | Main | Main | Main | Main | Main |
| Elizabeth Lail | Guinevere Beck | Main | Special guest | | Special guest | Special guest |
| Luca Padovan | Paco | Main | | | | Special guest |
| Zach Cherry | Ethan Russell | Main | | | | Special guest |
| Shay Mitchell | Peach Salinger | Main (Note: Shay Mitchell is credited as a series regular from the first through sixth episodes of the first season.) | | | | |
| Victoria Pedretti | Love Quinn | | Main | Main | Special guest | |
| Jenna Ortega | Ellie Alves | | Main | | | |
| James Scully | Forty Quinn | | Main | Special guest | | |
| Ambyr Childers | Candace Stone | Recurring | Main | | | |
| Carmela Zumbado | Delilah Alves | | Main | | | |
| Saffron Burrows | Dottie Quinn | | Recurring | Main (Note: Saffron Burrows is credited as a series regular from the first through seventh episodes of the third season.) | | Special guest |
| Tati Gabrielle | Marienne Bellamy | | | Main (Note: Tati Gabrielle is credited as a series regular only in the episodes which she appears in the fourth season.) | Main | Special guest |
| Shalita Grant | Sherry Conrad | | | Main | | Special guest |
| Travis Van Winkle | Cary Conrad | | | Main | | Special guest |
| Dylan Arnold | Theo Engler | | | Main | | |
| Charlotte Ritchie | Kate Galvin; Katherine Lockwood | | | | Main | Main |
| Tilly Keeper | Lady Phoebe | | | | Main | Special guest |
| Amy-Leigh Hickman | Nadia Farran | | | | Main | Recurring |
| Ed Speleers | Rhys Montrose | | | | Main | |
| Lukas Gage | Adam Pratt | | | | Main (Note: Lukas Gage is credited as a series regular from the first through ninth episodes of the fourth season.) | |
| Griffin Matthews | Teddy Lockwood | | | | | Main |
| Anna Camp | Reagan Lockwood | | | | | Main |
| Anna Camp | Maddie Lockwood | | | | | Main |
| Madeline Brewer | Louise Flannery; Bronte | | | | | Main |

=== Recurring cast ===
| Actor | Character | Season | | | | |
| Actor | Character | 1 | 2 | 3 | 4 | 5 |
|---|---|---|---|---|---|---|
| John Stamos | Dr. Nicholas "Nicky" Angevine | Recurring | Special guest | | | |
| Nicole Kang | Lynn Lieser | Recurring | | | | |
| Kathryn Gallagher | Annika Atwater | Recurring | | | | Special guest |
| Mark Blum | Mr. Mooney | Recurring | | | | |
| Daniel Cosgrove | Ron | Recurring | | | | |
| Victoria Cartagena | Claudia | Recurring | | | | |
| Lou Taylor Pucci | Benji Ashby III | Recurring | | | | |
| Hari Nef | Blythe | Recurring | | | | |
| Magda Apanowicz | Sandy Goldberg | | Recurring | Guest | | |
| Robin Lord Taylor | Will Bettelheim | | Recurring | | | Special guest |
| Adwin Brown | Calvin | | Recurring | | | |
| Chris D'Elia | Joshua "Henderson" Bunter | | Recurring | | | |
| Charlie Barnett | Gabe Miranda | | Recurring | | | |
| Marielle Scott | Lucy Sprecher | | Recurring | | | |
| Melanie Field | Sunrise Darshan Cummings | | Recurring | | | |
| Danny Vasquez | David Fincher | | Recurring | | | |
| Dallas Skye | Juliette Bellamy | | | Recurring | Recurring | |
| Ben Mehl | Dante Ferguson | | | Recurring | | |
| Christopher O'Shea | Andrew Tucker | | | Recurring | | |
| Bryan Safi | Jackson Newhall | | | Recurring | | |
| Mackenzie Astin | Gil Brigham | | | Recurring | | |
| Christopher Sean | Brandon | | | Recurring | | |
| Shannon Chan-Kent | Kiki | | | Recurring | | |
| Mauricio Lara | Paulie | | | Recurring | | |
| Scott Speedman | Matthew Engler | | | Recurring | | |
| Ayelet Zurer | Dr. Chandra | | | Recurring | | |
| Scott Michael Foster | Ryan Goodwin | | | Recurring | | |
| Kim Shaw | Nurse Fiona | | | Recurring | | |
| Stephen Hagan | Malcolm Harding | | | | Recurring | |
| Adam James | Elliot Tannenberg | | | | Recurring | |
| Brad Alexander | Edward | | | | Recurring | |
| Aidan Cheng | Simon Soo | | | | Recurring | |
| Niccy Lin | Sophie Soo | | | | Recurring | |
| Eve Austin | Gemma Graham-Greene | | | | Recurring | |
| Ozioma Whenu | Blessing Bosede | | | | Recurring | |
| Dario Coates | Connie | | | | Recurring | |
| Sean Pertwee | Vic | | | | Recurring | |
| Ben Wiggins | Roald Walker-Burton | | | | Recurring | |
| Alison Pargeter | Dawn Brown | | | | Recurring | |
| Greg Kinnear | Tom Lockwood | | | | Special guest | |
| Frankie DeMaio | Henry Quinn-Goldberg | | | | | Recurring |
| Natasha Behnam | Dominique | | | | | Recurring |
| Pete Ploszek | Harrison | | | | | Recurring |
| Tom Francis | Clayton Angevine | | | | | Recurring |
| b | Phoenix | | | | | Recurring |

== Main characters ==
=== Joe Goldberg ===
Joseph Gabriel Goldberg (Penn Badgley) is a bookstore manager at Mooney's who stalks and dates Guinevere Beck in the first season. In the second season, he goes by the name Will Bettelheim and works as a bookstore clerk at Anavrin, and stalks and dates Love Quinn. Joe then marries Love, has a son named Henry and moves to the San Francisco suburbs. However, his obsessive behavior still finds a way back into their lives, ruining his marriage. At the end of season 3, Joe kills Love and moves to London, where he is given the cover identity of Jonathan Moore, a college English professor. While in London, Joe undergoes a psychotic break that causes his personality to dissociate, leading him to unconsciously commit a string of murders. During this time, Joe enters a passionate relationship with heiress Kate Galvin. He and Kate eventually move back to New York, where Kate takes over her family business and rehabilitates Joe's public image. Joe is portrayed as a teenager by Gianni Ciardiello in season one, and as a child by Aidan Wallace and Jack Fisher in season two and season three respectively.

=== Guinevere Beck ===
Guinevere Beck (Elizabeth Lail; season 1, special guest seasons 2, 4 & 5) is a broke NYU graduate student and an aspiring writer with whom Joe falls in love. She is best friends with Peach and close friends with Lynn and Annika. She was also in an on-again, off-again relationship with her ex, Benji, but becomes the girlfriend of Joe Goldberg. She suffers the consequences of Joe's successful attempts to manipulate and control her life.

In the first season finale, Beck accidentally discovers the truth about Joe and his crimes, and he imprisons her in a glass cage in the bookstore’s basement. Due to her failed efforts to escape, Beck is ultimately killed by Joe in a fit of rage, who stages the scene to make it look like someone else was responsible for her death. Four months later, it is revealed that Joe submitted Beck's posthumously released book The Dark Face of Love, and framed Dr. Nicky for the murder.

Driven by the death of her close friend Beck, Louise Flannery spent years uncovering the truth behind Joe’s carefully hidden trail of violence. With the help of a network of online detectives, she begins to gather the evidence that could finally bring him down. As Louise closes in on the truth, Joe finds himself increasingly cornered. Desperate to regain control, he tries to manipulate her—but misjudges her determination. Their confrontation escalates into a brutal struggle, during which Joe seriously wounds Louise, though she ultimately survives. Refusing to be silenced, she emerges with irrefutable evidence of his crimes and makes it public. The revelations spark a media frenzy, culminating in Joe’s arrest and a sensational trial that lays bare the full extent of his violent history, including the murder of Beck. He is sentenced to life in prison, becoming a twisted cultural figure—reviled by many, yet disturbingly idolized by some as a dark antihero.

Meanwhile, Louise releases a redacted version of Beck’s unfinished manuscript, giving voice to the victims Joe tried to erase and ensuring their stories are finally heard.

=== Paco ===
Paco (Luca Padovan; season 1; guest season 5) is Joe's young neighbor and Claudia’s son. He and Joe form a strong bond over their shared love of books. Paco also has a tumultuous relationship with his mother’s abusive boyfriend, Ron.

Later, angry after Ron hurt his mother again, Paco attempts to steal a gun from the bookstore to avenge his mother. He is caught and confronted by Joe. Instead, Paco drugs Ron and hits him with a bat. Ron wakes up to Joe who is trying to revive him and brutally beats him. Ron later returns looking for Paco, who hides from him. Joe arrives and kills Ron to protect Paco and Paco emerges from his hiding spot. Joe tells him that everything is going to be okay and Ron won't hurt him or his mom anymore. Joe takes care of the disposal of Ron and tells Paco not to ever tell anyone what happened.

When Paco later goes to the bookstore and finds Beck attempting to escape the basement, begging Paco to find the key and insisting that Joe is crazy and dangerous, Paco runs away leaving Beck to be murdered by Joe.

Paco and his mother Claudia moved away from New York to start fresh.

Six years later, Paco posted a video on TikTok in an attempt to defend Joe's reputation when he was accused of being a serial killer, but it only incriminates him further.

=== Ethan Russell ===
Ethan Russell (Zach Cherry; season 1; guest season 5) is a bookstore clerk who worked with Joe.

=== Peach Salinger ===
Peach Anaïs Salinger (Shay Mitchell; season 1) is a wealthy and influential socialite and Beck's best friend whom she met at Brown University. Peach is revealed to be secretly obsessed with Beck and has an adversarial relationship with Joe who later kills her.

=== Love Quinn ===
Love Quinn (Victoria Pedretti; season 2–3, special guest season 4) is an aspiring chef and health guru in Los Angeles. Love is the heiress to a self-care business started by her wealthy parents, who launched the grocery store Anavrin ("Nirvana" spelled backwards and based on the real-life grocery chain Erewhon) when Love and her brother Forty were teenagers. Love noticed Forty was being sexually abused by Sofia, the family's au pair, and murdered her after drugging Forty, allowing him to believe he blacked out and killed Sofia himself. Love's parents elected to cover up the death to protect Forty, who grew up with severe unresolved trauma and developed an addiction to alcohol and drugs. Love made it her responsibility during adulthood to manage Forty's sobriety. She later went to culinary school and fell in love with a deaf man named James whom she married, but he ultimately died of a medical condition.

Love begins the series as an employee at Anavrin. She meets Joe – who also begins working at the store under the pseudonym Will Bettelheim – and quickly becomes attracted to him. She secretly discovers that Joe has been stalking her and keeps a glass cage inside his storage unit, which she takes as signs of his passion. She also deduces Beck as Joe's ex-girlfriend via her memoir and deems her undeserving of him. As she and Joe become closer, Love is visited by Candace (who was posing as Forty's girlfriend), who reveals that Joe is living under an alias and tried to murder Candace. Love feigns disbelief, but cuts ties with Joe, only to realize she still has feelings for him. Love learns that Joe was in a sexual relationship with his landlord Delilah and later discovers her being held hostage inside the glass cage. Love murders Delilah to tie up loose ends. Candace later discovers the storage unit herself and traps Joe inside the cage with Delilah's corpse, then calls Love to the unit to prove Joe's psychopathy to her. Love, however, murders Candace and reveals to Joe that she murdered Delilah and has been obsessed with him. Joe attempts to kill her, but she reveals she is pregnant with his child. Forty realizes Joe is a serial killer and calls Love and Joe to Anavrin. He warns Love to stay clear of Joe and prepares to execute him at gunpoint, but is shot dead by police officer David Fincher. Joe and Love move to a suburb outside San Francisco to raise their child, Henry.

Love and Joe will have to adjust to the life of parents. Love along with Joe meets Sherry Conrad in a cafeteria. Love and Joe go to Sherry's party. Love listens as Sherry and her friends gossip about her and then gets to know more about Natalie Engler (Michaela McManus), her neighbor, which makes Love decide to open her bakery. Love discovers Joe's box where she keeps belongings from her obsessions, there she finds something from Natalie discovering that she is Joe's new obsession. She calls Natalie to see her bakery location, and in a moment of jealousy, Love kills Natalie. She asks Joe to help her cover up the death of her neighbor. Love meets Theo who flirts with her. Later, Love and Joe tell the bakery about Natalie, and they put Joe's vault in the basement. Love discovers that Theo is the son of her neighbor, Matthew Engler and therefore Natalie's stepson.

Theo flirts with Love again at her bakery, but she rebuffs his advances. Henry contracts measles. Love and Joe decide to frame Matthew, but they fail. While Henry recovers, Joe and Love decide not to frame Matthew. The next day, Gil, a neighbor, reveals to Love that Henry contracted measles from his twin daughters and he and his wife are both anti-vaccination. As Gil leaves, Love beats him unconscious. Love and Joe lock Gil in the vault in the basement of the bakery. Love enlists the Quinns' enforcer to investigate Gil's life and discovers that his son is a sexual predator. They confront Gil and he is disgusted, causing him to commit suicide. Joe and Love decide to frame Gil for Natalie's death. Theo kisses Love after a heart-to-heart moment with each other at the bakery.

Theo calls Love from the police station about an incident. Theo then invites Love to ride a scooter with him and they end up having sex. Dottie gives Love advice. Love buys a pregnancy test and messages Forty as if he were a living person, confessing that she might be pregnant with Theo's baby. Love attends an event for Dottie, where she is taken out of her pregnancy scare. She hallucinates Forty, making her have an epiphany about her life. Theo warns Love that Matthew is spying on everyone at Madre Linda. She decides to keep Theo around to get more information from Matthew. Love unsuccessfully tries to spice things up with Joe, which leads to her having rebound sex with Theo. At a fundraiser, Love meets Marienne Bellamy. Sherry tells Love that she and Cary (Travis Van Winkle) are very attracted to her and Joe and that they should try to take her relationship to another level. Dottie is cut out of her family's life by Love because of her carelessness with Henry. Love discusses Sherry's proposal with Joe.

Joe and Love to meet with the Conrads and they are presented with a confidentiality agreement. Joe and Love invite the Conrads to their sexual encounter. Love realizes Joe has someone other than her on her mind while he is having sex with Sherry, leading to an argument which causes Love to reveal out loud that she killed Natalie. The Conrads try to flee the house, but Joe and Love overpower them and put them in the cage. Theo tells Love to run away with him, believing Joe to be a violent husband upon seeing footage of an earlier argument between Love and Joe and offers to get Love a copy of the footage, which Love accepts. Sherry tries to bond with Love so that she and Cary are released from the cage. Love discovers that Joe has Cary's gun, gives the gun to the Conrads, and tells them he would let one of them walk free while the other dies. Love finds Theo in the bakery, learns what he saw, and hits him with a fire extinguisher.

Love confesses to Joe that she attacked Theo, who is in the basement of the bakery. She also talks about starting a new chapter in her and Joe's life by having a new baby. Love discovers Joe's bloody T-shirt and realizes that Marienne is the one Joe is obsessed with. Love cooks a special dinner for her and Joe, where she confronts him about Marienne while Joe confronts her about James' mysterious death. Love leaves the table to tend to a crying Henry. She returns and reveals that she accidentally killed James. She also reveals that she knew Joe would grab a knife and poisoned the handle of it, leaving him paralyzed. Love asks Marienne to come over to her house and then goes to drop off some orders. Love returns and confronts Marienne and reveals that Joe killed her ex-husband. Marienne advises Love to leave Joe and listen to the voice inside her. Love reconsiders her actions after Marienne's words, draws the conclusion that her actions are unforgivable, and that Joe is the problem in her relationship.

In the end, she realizes her mistakes and comes to the conclusion that in order to change, she must kill Joe. She tries to kill him, but Joe kills her first by injecting her with wolf's bane. As Love slowly dies, she tells him to leave Henry because he will know who he is (her words prove to be prophetic in the last episode of the series). Joe forges an email from Love to their friends and family, stages a murder–suicide by burning down the house and drops Henry off in front of Dante Ferguson and Lansing's house.

Love is portrayed as a teenager by Olivia Ragan.

=== Ellie Alves ===
Ellie Alves (Jenna Ortega; season 2) is Delilah's fifteen-year-old sister and Joe's new neighbor in LA. She quickly befriends Joe and helps him establish an online presence. Joe learns that Ellie has befriended stand-up comic Henderson – whom Delilah reveals sexually assaulted her when underage – and accidentally murders Henderson after he drugs Ellie. Love's brother Forty later hires Ellie as an "intern" to help him draft a screenplay. Ellie becomes distraught when Delilah goes missing. Joe, who is preparing to leave LA, informs her Delilah is dead and that he killed Henderson, and gives her money to move out of LA permanently. Joe continues to provide Ellie with monthly payments after moving into a suburb with Love.

=== Forty Quinn ===
Forty Athol Quinn (James Scully; season 2, special guest season 3) is Love's beloved and troubled twin brother. Forty is the heir to a self-care business started by his wealthy parents, who launched the grocery store Anavrin when he and Love were young. As a child, Forty was sexually abused by Sofia, the family's au pair, believing himself to be in love with her. Love murdered Sofia after drugging Forty, allowing him to believe he blacked out and killed her himself. Their parents elected to cover up the death to protect Forty, who grew up with severe unresolved trauma and developed an addiction to alcohol and drugs. Love made it her responsibility during adulthood to manage Forty's sobriety.

Forty begins the series as Anavrin's spoiled, arrogant manager. He befriends Joe and attempts to use him to grow close to stand-up comic Henderson, to whom he has repeatedly attempted to pitch various film projects to no avail. Forty breaks his sobriety at one of Henderson's parties. Joe takes him home and has sex with Love for the first time, though the two only disclose their relationship to Forty later on. Forty begins dating a woman named Amy Adam (Joe's ex Candace under an alias), who introduces him to Beck's posthumous memoir and encourages him to adapt it into a screenplay. He later learns that Joe is living in Los Angeles under an alias to escape Candace and cuts ties with her. As Joe is preparing to leave Los Angeles, Forty stages a kidnapping and has hired thugs confine he, Joe and Ellie (whom Forty hired as an intern) to a hotel suite to complete Forty's screenplay from start to finish. Forty later takes LSD (which he also gives to Joe) to enhance his creative process, and deduces that Beck was murdered not by her therapist (as is written in the book), but her unnamed ex-boyfriend. He confides to a secretly worried Joe that his believed role in Sofia's death led him to this insight.

Along the way, Forty has sex with Candace again, who tells him Joe is Beck's ex-boyfriend, who also attempted to murder Candace. Forty is skeptical but decides to talk to Beck's therapist Dr. Nicky (whom Joe framed for Beck's murder). He travels to New York to meet Nicky in prison, but Nicky warns him to stay away from Joe. Forty soon realizes Joe is indeed a serial killer and calls he and Love to Anavrin to warn Love to stay away from Joe. However, as he prepares to execute Joe at gunpoint, Forty is shot dead by police officer David Fincher, who followed Ellie to the scene. Forty is portrayed as a teenager by Anton Starkman.

=== Candace Stone ===
Candace Stone (Ambyr Childers; season 2, recurring season 1) is Joe's ex-girlfriend. Candace was once an aspiring musician who cheated on Joe with Elijah, a record executive, in an attempt to get signed to the latter's label. Joe later murdered Elijah. When Candace admitted to Joe she no longer loved him, Joe kidnapped her and took her to the woods. When she attempted to escape, Joe hit her over the head and buried her, unaware she was still alive. Candace escaped her grave and attempted to report the incident to the police, who were unable to do anything due to lack of evidence.

Candace unexpectedly shows up at Joe's bookstore soon after he kills Beck and vows revenge on him. She later follows Joe to Los Angeles (where he moved to escape her) and begins dating Forty Quinn under the alias "Amy Adam" to grow close to Joe. A suspicious Love hires a private investigator to look into Candace and learns that she is living under an alias. Before leaving, Candace reveals to Love that Joe himself is living under a false identity (Will Bettelheim) and tried to murder her. Candace later finds the storage unit where Joe keeps a large glass cage and traps him inside with the corpse of his landlord, Delilah. She then calls Love to the storage unit to prove Joe's psychopathy, but Love, who had killed Delilah, murders Candace.

=== Delilah Alves ===
Delilah Alves (Carmela Zumbado; season 2) is Ellie's older sister, Joe's landlord, and an investigative reporter. She confides to Joe that she was sexually assaulted by stand-up comedian Henderson while underage; Joe encourages her to expose his crimes. Joe himself attempts to help Delilah by breaking into Henderson's home and anonymously delivering her photographs of Henderson's other victims recovered from his basement, but Joe accidentally kills Henderson in a confrontation, and his death taints her investigation. Joe later advises Delilah to simply write about her own experience rather than seek justice for every one of his victims, as her story may prompt other victims to come forward on their own. Delilah and Joe begin a sexual relationship along the way. One day, Delilah finds a key in Joe's apartment leading to a storage unit where he keeps a large glass cage. Joe arrives before Delilah can leave and imprisons her in the cage, using electronic handcuffs timed to unlock after 16 hours (by which point Joe will have left LA). However, Love discovers the storage unit herself and murders Delilah to protect Joe.

=== Dottie Quinn ===
Dottie Quinn (Saffron Burrows; season 3, recurring season 2; guest season 5) is Love and Forty's mother. She is the ex-wife of Ray and has a tumultuous relationship with her family.

=== Marienne Bellamy ===
Marienne Bellamy (Tati Gabrielle; season 3–4; guest season 5) is a librarian and keen observer of the denizens of Madre Linda. Beneath her reserved exterior, Marienne struggles with past issues that set her back, as she tries to create a better life for herself and her daughter. She is Joe's boss at the library. She has a young daughter named Juliette. Her ex-boyfriend, Ryan, is a successful local television reporter. Both he and Marienne were addicted to drugs in the past. Though she has been sober for years, and he continues to use drugs, he is able to manipulate the courts and other people to see him as responsible, and her as a terrible mother. He has full custody of Juliette, though his mother does all the work and he spends very little time with her.

Joe and Marienne begin as friends, but Joe soon becomes obsessed with her and gradually starts to gain her trust and romantic affection. Joe attempts to help her win her custody battle with Ryan, but ultimately ends up killing him. Love, having decided to kill Joe, calls Marienne to their house to kill her as well, but relents when she sees her daughter, and instead tells Marienne the truth about Joe. Marienne flees to Paris where she makes a living as an artist. Joe kills Love, fakes his death, then follows Marienne to Europe. He eventually tracks her down in London, at an art fair. Marienne rebuffs Joe and calls him a murderer, but Joe, hoping to prove her wrong, lets her go. Joe is later ordered by a fixer working for Love's family to kill Marienne to tie up loose ends, but Joe instead pickpockets her necklace while she is at a train station leaving London and sends a photo of it to the fixer to make it appear he killed Marienne.

Joe is later revealed to have poisoned Marienne's coffee with a sedative and kidnapped her before she could leave London. He kept her in a temporary apartment for days where he restrained her, then drugged her to sleep at night. Joe eventually moved her to a glass cage he built in a basement beneath an abandoned building. Upon imprisoning her, she struggles to escape and Joe breaks her arm. Joe then has a psychotic break and dissociates, forgetting his kidnapping of Marienne. Joe soon stops bringing her food and water, leaving her alone to starve. Marienne is found weeks later by Joe's student Nadia, who concocts a plan to help her escape. When Joe eventually remembers his horrifying actions, Marienne asks him to check on Juliette. He texts her friend Beatrice on Marienne's phone, and realizes she has lost custody of her daughter. This devastates Marienne, and Joe returns to find her overdosed on the pain pills he left her. However, the texts were really from Nadia, who switched the pills with beta blockers which made her appear dead. Joe finds her body, and a note containing her dying wish: that her body will be found. Consumed by guilt, he leaves Marienne on a park bench. Marienne escapes that night and reunites with her daughter in Paris, where she is finally free, since Joe believes her to be dead. Later, she sees in the news that Joe is now a celebrated figure after his newest lover/victim, Kate Lockwood, uses her wealth to rehabilitate his public image.

=== Sherry Conrad ===
Sherry Conrad (Shalita Grant; season 3; guest season 5) is a locally famous "momfluencer," admired by her social media followers for her well-crafted persona. She is Cary’s wife and they befriend Love and Joe after they move to Madre Linda.

=== Cary Conrad ===
Cary Conrad (Travis Van Winkle; season 3; guest season 5) is a wealthy, charismatic, and self-proclaimed founder who runs his own supplement company. He is Sherry’s husband and they befriend Joe and Love after they move to Madre Linda.

=== Theo Engler ===
Theodore Engler (Dylan Arnold; season 3) is a troubled college student who has a strained relationship with his stepfather, Matthew Engler. He is the next door neighbor of the Goldbergs and becomes infatuated with Love.

=== Kate Lockwood ===
Katherine Lockwood (Charlotte Ritchie; season 4–5), also known as Kate Galvin, is an art dealer in whom Joe becomes interested. She is the estranged daughter of Tom Lockwood, a powerful activist investor with whom she cut ties because of the harm his business dealings have done to the world. As a result, Kate chooses not to identify with the British upper class despite being surrounded by wealthy and aristocratic friends.

Kate begins the fourth season in a relationship with Malcolm Harding, an obnoxious professor at the college where Joe teaches under his "Jonathan Moore" identity. After Malcolm is murdered, Joe follows Kate around to protect her, and the two become closer and eventually have sex. Their relationship escalates during a getaway to Lady Phoebe's family estate, where Kate reveals her family background to Joe. That night, Kate discovers her friend Gemma murdered in her bedroom, and she and Joe hide the body, after which Joe reveals he is being framed for Malcolm's murder. After the real killer, Rhys Montrose, imprisons Joe in an underground dungeon alongside Roald Walker-Burton, Kate's childhood friend, Kate rescues them. Days later, Kate asks Joe out on a date, but he declines. However, Joe eventually relents and admits his feelings for Kate, and the two begin dating.

Kate's father soon arrives in London, where he proposes that Kate take over the family business. Kate vehemently declines, but Tom reveals he has manipulated her career even after their estrangement, leaving her devastated. Joe later kills Tom and attempts suicide, but the police rescue him. Kate covers up Joe's involvement in the death of Rhys Montrose, which she learns was ordered by her father. Joe tells her his real name, and the two move back to New York City, where Kate takes over her father's company and reshapes it to have a more philanthropic intent. She helps rehabilitate Joe's public image, making him a celebrated figure in the media.

Like most of Joe's love interests in You, Kate had been blinded by Joe's charm. However, the time eventually came when she could no longer pretend her husband wasn't a monster. This is always when Joe turns on his lovers. Guinevere Beck and Love Quinn both died when Joe lost interest in them, and Marienne Bellamy very nearly met the same fate. Kate was determined to take Joe down first, however. She teamed up with Nadia and Marienne to finally bring Joe to justice.

During a fight, Joe and Kate seemed to have gotten the better of one another. They both lay wounded in the basement of Mooney's Bookstore, waiting for the flames to overtake them. Kate also suffered a gunshot wound. Bronte showed up and pulled Joe from the building, but Kate's seemly lifeless body was left behind. Before losing consciousness in Mooney's basement, Kate acknowledged the irony of her impending death. She noted that both of Joe's wives would be burned in fires. However, Joe's second wife lived on to care for and love his son, ensuring that Henry would not grow up to become a monster like his father.

=== Lady Phoebe ===
Phoebe Borehall-Blaxworth, nicknamed "Lady Phoebe" (Tilly Keeper; season 4; guest season 5), is a wealthy social media influencer who is part of the royal family. She is romantically involved with Adam and has a dramatic yet bubbly personality.

Joe meets Phoebe at a party at Adam's elite social club, Sundry House, where he becomes heavily intoxicated on absinthe and says something to Phoebe that leaves her profoundly moved. Phoebe becomes intensely attracted to Joe as a result of this conversation and attempts to seduce him at her family estate, but Joe rejects her advances. Phoebe then confides that she is afraid Adam may not love her. After part of Phoebe's family estate burns down in a fire unwittingly set by Joe, she attends one of Kate's art fundraisers, where she is kidnapped by a deranged fan, Dawn Brown, only for Joe to rescue her. Adam proposes to Phoebe shortly thereafter, but she rejects him after learning the truth about his financial problems and infidelity from Dawn. However, Phoebe enters a spiral of PTSD following her kidnapping. Kate arranges her stay at a rehab facility, and Adam convinces Phoebe to marry him instead. Adam pushes for a hasty marriage, using Phoebe's money to solve his bankruptcy problems. Kate, Joe, and her family all try to save her from marrying Adam, but he isolates Phoebe, telling her they do not care about her happiness and that he loves her. Phoebe realizes too late what Adam is doing, and suffers a mental breakdown at her wedding and is hospitalized.

While Phoebe is in the hospital, Adam hires several sex workers and consents to be tied up. However, they were sent by Kate's father to kill Adam painfully. His body is found, and Kate confronts her father about his involvement. Phoebe eventually recovers, leaves the country and her socialite lifestyle behind, and becomes an English teacher in Thailand.

=== Nadia Farran ===
Nadia Farran Fareedi (Amy-Leigh Hickman; season 4; recurring season 5) is one of Joe’s students. She is outspoken and competitive, and a lover of genre fiction. Joe initially enlists her help in finding the killer who has been stalking him, under the guise of writing a murder-mystery novel. Joe later learns Nadia and Malcolm were in a sexual relationship, and retrieves a letter she wrote him from his apartment to avoid the scandal from going public.

Nadia begins dating her classmate Edward, with whom she often clashes academically, and the two attend one of Kate's gallery auctions where they are surprised to see Joe. Nadia, a fan of Lady Phoebe's, goes to look for her, unaware that she has been kidnapped by Dawn Brown, a crazed fan. Joe, meanwhile, plants Simon Soo's severed ear in Dawn's bag to frame her for the "Eat the Rich" murders, and Nadia witnesses Dawn's arrest, becoming suspicious of Joe when she overhears Phoebe call him a "hero". Nadia soon breaks into Joe's office and finds a key which leads her to the basement of an abandoned building where Joe has kept Marienne imprisoned in a glass cage. A horrified Nadia makes a plan to help Marienne escape, fabricating texts on her phone making it look like Marienne lost custody of her daughter, and giving Marienne ketamine to make it look like she overdosed in response. Joe falls for the ruse and leaves Marienne in a park where she escapes later that night after Nadia follows Joe and injects Marienne to wake her up. Nadia looks for further clues in Joe's apartment with Edward standing by and takes photographs of the evidence. When Nadia looks for Edward, Joe finds her and leads her to Edward's slain corpse. As the police sirens are heard he hands her his knife and tells her he planted evidence in her flat to get her arrested for Edward's murder. Joe, whose public image has been rehabilitated with Kate's help, notes that Nadia has remained in prison since.

In season 5, Nadia is released from prison by Kate Lockwood, utilising her immense resources to clear Nadia's record. She teams up with Marienne and Kate to take down Joe in his cage. As he is arrested in the finale, all charges on her are dropped for good and she becomes a writing teacher.

=== Rhys Montrose ===
Rhys Montrose (Ed Speleers; season 4) is an author and aspiring mayor of London whose memoir about his experiences in prison lifted him out of poverty. He quickly forms a connection with Joe over their similar personal backgrounds.

After a string of murders among London's elite dubbed the "Eat the Rich" killings, Joe discovers it was Rhys who committed the murders out of his apparent resentment towards the rich. However, Rhys is later revealed to be a figment of Joe's own imagination: Joe developed an obsessive interest in Rhys' life upon moving to London, finding commonalities between Rhys' rise from poverty and his own desire for moral redemption. Upon his kidnapping and imprisonment of Marienne Bellamy, Joe suffered a psychotic break that caused a rift in his identity, leading to recurring hallucinations of Rhys as a manifestation of his repressed, murderous impulses. Joe discovers this upon killing the real (innocent) Rhys in a blind rage. Joe's visions of Rhys persist despite this, and Joe attempts to expunge them by killing himself, seeing no other way to end his cycle of violence. However, the police rescue Joe and he moves back to New York City with Kate, who has helped rehabilitate his public image. As a result, Joe comes to accept his dark nature and continues seeing visions of Rhys.

=== Adam Pratt ===
Adam Pratt (Lukas Gage; season 4) is an American playboy who hails from a wealthy family and owns Sundry House, an elite London social club. He is dating Lady Phoebe and has a strained relationship with his father, who he typically consults to bail him out of debt from his failed business ventures. Adam eventually proposes to Lady Phoebe despite being unfaithful to her, hoping her family wealth will free him from his mounting debts, and furthermore help Sundry House expand into a franchise. Phoebe rejects his proposal upon learning of his intentions from an obsessed fan who briefly kidnaps her, but suffers a downward spiral of PTSD in the following days and returns to Adam for solace. Adam takes advantage of Phoebe's declining mental state and hastily marries her, but Phoebe experiences a nervous breakdown at her wedding and is hospitalized. Meanwhile, Adam is murdered by a group of hitmen posing as prostitutes, who Kate later learns were sent by her father, Tom Lockwood, in a ploy to help Kate fix her relationship with Phoebe.

=== Teddy Lockwood ===
Theodore Lockwood-Hayes (Griffin Matthews; season 5) is one of the children of billionaire Tom Lockwood. Teddy is the snarky yet loyal brother-in-law of Joe Goldberg. A confidante who was never fully accepted by the Lockwood family, Teddy brings authenticity and empathy to a family for whom such things are a foreign concept.

=== Reagan Lockwood ===
Reagan Lockwood-Jacobs (Anna Camp; season 5) is one of the children of billionaire Tom Lockwood. Reagan was the cunning, cutthroat CFO of the T.R. Lockwood Corporation who had her eyes on the throne.

=== Maddie Lockwood ===
Madison Lockwood (Anna Camp; season 5) is one of the children of billionaire Tom Lockwood. Maddie presents as the unserious twin, a thrice-divorced socialite whose job is ‘vaguely PR’, but make no mistake, a master manipulator lies underneath Maddie’s frivolous façade.

=== Bronte / Louise Flannery ===
Louise Flannery (Madeline Brewer; season 5) is a mysterious character. She is a new employee at the bookstore who will make Joe Goldberg question his entire existence. Later she was revealed that she along with her friends catfishing Joe to investigate the murders that he made in his past and especially Beck’s death.

== Recurring characters ==
=== Introduced in season one ===
- Lynn Lieser (Nicole Kang; season 1), one of Beck's rich friends.
- Annika Atwater (Kathryn Gallagher; season 1; guest season 5), one of Beck's friends and a social media influencer.
- Ivan Mooney (Mark Blum; season 1), the owner of Mooney's and Joe's adopted father, who mentored him in restoring books. Mooney frequently locked Joe inside the reinforced glass cage used to store old books.
- Ron Baker (Daniel Cosgrove; season 1), the parole officer boyfriend of Claudia. He is abusive towards Claudia and has an abrasive relationship with Paco. Joe kills him after he attempts to assault Paco.
- Claudia (Victoria Cartagena; season 1), Paco's mother and Ron’s girlfriend. She is a nurse at the local hospital and is abused by Ron. She leaves New York for California at the end of season one.
- Benjamin "Benji" Ashby III (Lou Taylor Pucci; season 1), Beck's wealthy, toxic hipster ex-boyfriend. Joe kills him with a peanut oil (which he is deathly allergic to) tainted drink.
- Blythe (Hari Nef; season 1), a rival graduate student to Beck. She later begins dating, and moves in with Ethan.
- Dr. Nicholas "Nicky" Angevine (John Stamos; season 1, special guest season 2), Beck's therapist.

=== Introduced in season two ===
- Will Bettelheim (Robin Lord Taylor; season 2; guest season 5), a hacker who deals with unsavory clients as part of his job and whose identity Joe briefly assumes. Joe keeps Will trapped in his glass cage while taking on his name, but eventually allows him to leave in an effort to overcome his homicidal tendencies. Will moves to the Philippines to live with a woman he had met online.
- Calvin (Adwin Brown; season 2), a manager at Anavrin, a trendy high-end grocery store.
- Sandy Goldberg (Magda Apanowicz; season 2, guest season 3), Joe's biological mother, who was abused by Joe's violent father throughout Joe's childhood and frequently made plans to run away with other men. After a young Joe murdered his father to protect his mother, Sandy left home with another man and abandoned Joe, who spent the remainder of his childhood in group homes.
- Raphael Passero (Billy Lush, season 2), Joe's biological father.
- Joshua "Henderson" Bunter (Chris D'Elia; season 2), a famous stand-up comedian in Los Angeles. He has a history of drugging and sexually assaulting underage girls, including Will's landlord Delilah – who is attempting to protect her younger sister Ellie – who has befriended Henderson – from the same fate. Joe breaks into Henderson's home and discovers photographs of his victims that he anonymously delivers to Delilah to help her in exposing Henderson's crimes, but the undistinguished nature of the images does little to corroborate her story. Joe later breaks into the home a second time to spy on Henderson while he is with Ellie, whom Henderson attempts to drug. However, Joe drugs Henderson and brings him to the basement to confront him. When Henderson tries to escape, Joe accidentally kills him and disposes of his body.
- Gabe Miranda (Charlie Barnett; season 2), a successful acupuncturist and Love's oldest friend and closest confidant. After Love and Joe break up, Gabe treats Joe to acupuncture therapy and helps him realize the importance of self-love.
- Lucy Sprecher (Marielle Scott; season 2), an edgy-chic literary agent and Sunrise's partner. She and Sunrise soon get married.
- Sunrise Darshan Cummings (Melanie Field; season 2), a stay-at-home lifestyle blogger and Lucy's partner. She and Lucy eventually get married.
- David Fincher (Danny Vasquez; season 2), an LAPD officer and Delilah’s friend.

=== Introduced in season three ===
- Dante Ferguson (Ben Mehl; season 3), a librarian who retains his wit and equanimity no matter what the day brings. A veteran whose eyesight was damaged, Dante is a dedicated family man with a husband and two stepchildren who longs to expand his family, and delights in helping his friends with their children.
- Andrew Tucker (Christopher O'Shea; season 3), an adoring member of Sherry's cliquish inner circle. A fit stay-at-home dad, Andrew is dependably tuned in to the latest town gossip.
- Jackson Newhall (Bryan Safi; season 3), Andrew's wry husband. They have an enviable, loving marriage. Despite Jackson's high-powered job as a tech attorney, he has managed to stay humble.
- Gil Brigham (Mackenzie Astin; season 3), a mild-mannered geology professor is thoughtful, friendly, and good-hearted if a bit vanilla and naïve.
- Brandon (Christopher Sean; season 3), Kiki's husband, who became rich in his mid-20s as a tech investor, is a stay-at-home dad for his kids.
- Kiki (Shannon Chan-Kent; season 3), a devoted member of Sherry's cliquish "mean girl" friend group. She is a wife, mother and life coach who enjoys a life of entitlement, frequenting mid-day fitness classes and enjoying lengthy gossip sessions at the local café.
- Paulie (Mauricio Lara; season 3), a friend of Joe's when he was a child. Savvy with hard-earned smarts beyond his years, Paulie attempts to help his friend toughen up and negotiate the tough world of the boys home.
- Matthew Engler (Scott Speedman; season 3), an affluent CEO, husband and "uncommunicative" father who is reserved, at times mysterious, and has a tendency to be withdrawn.
- Dr. Chandra (Ayelet Zurer; season 3), a chic, brusque, but extremely seasoned couple's therapist who has every intention of getting to the bottom of her patients' issues.
- Ryan Goodwin (Scott Michael Foster; season 3), a local television reporter. Ryan is a well-liked single dad who has overcome a history of addiction, but has secrets, including a controlling, calculating demeanor that he reserves for those closest to him and anyone who gets in his way.
- Nurse Fiona (Kim Shaw; season 3), Joe’s nurse at the group home, who was the first woman he grew an attachment to.

=== Introduced in season four ===
- Malcolm Harding (Stephen Hagan), a professor at Joe’s college, as well as his landlord. An arrogant and obnoxious man, he is Kate's boyfriend, although he is known to be disloyal, including having an affair with student Nadia.
- Elliot Tannenberg (Adam James), the Quinn family fixer who gives Joe his new identity.
- Simon Soo (Aidan Cheng), a tortured artist and Sophie’s brother. He is revealed to claim ownership of art completed by younger, lower-class artists.
- Sophie Soo (Niccy Lin), a wealthy social media influencer and Simon’s sister.
- Gemma Graham-Greene (Eve Austin), a pompous heiress. She is long-time friends with Phoebe and Kate and known to be derogatory to her lower-class staff.
- Blessing Bosede (Ozioma Whenu), a Nigerian princess in Phoebe's friend group.
- Connie (Dario Coates), a member of Phoebe's friend group struggling with drug and alcohol addiction.
- Edward (Brad Alexander), one of Joe’s students and Nadia’s classmate who frequently clashes with her in classroom discussions.
- Vic (Sean Pertwee), Phoebe’s bodyguard.
- Roald Walker-Burton (Ben Wiggins), a wealthy and pompous photographer who is obsessed with Kate.
- Dawn Brown (Alison Pargeter), a tabloid photographer who has a parasocial obsession with Lady Phoebe.
- Thomas R. "Tom" Lockwood (Greg Kinnear), Kate's estranged American father who is a powerful activist shareholder in numerous shady business dealings.

=== Introduced in season five ===
- Dominique (Natasha Behnam) who appears to be an aloof hipster, but is a passionate, clever, fiercely loyal young woman with a wealthy upringing and a headstrong caretaker among her scrappy artist friends
- Harrison Jacobs (Pete Ploszek), a former pro-football player, husband to Reagan Lockwood and Joe's brother-in-law
- Clayton Angevine (Tom Francis), a pretentious, self-absorbed, aspiring author whose vindictive, controlling nature draws Joe's attention
- Phoenix (b), is shrewd and resourceful with a strong moral code. Their young life was upended by tragedy, setting them on a course that led to New York and a search for renewed purpose.

== Guest characters ==
=== Introduced in season one ===
- Professor Paul Leahy (Reg Rogers), Beck's graduate school advisor who has a sexual interest in her.
- Edwin Beck (Michael Park), Beck's father.
- Nancy Whitesell (Emily Bergl), Edwin's new wife, and Beck's stepmother.
- Officer Nico (Michael Maize), a Greenwich police officer.
- Raj (Gerrard Lobo), a med student and an old friend of Beck and Peach.
- Karen Minty (Natalie Paul), Paco's babysitter and Joe's new girlfriend after his short-lived breakup with Beck.
- Ross (Ryan Andes), a private investigator hired by Peach's family to look into her death.

=== Introduced in season two ===
- Jasper Krenn (Steven W. Bailey), a criminal to whom Will owes money.
- Kathy Griffin, a eulogist at Henderson's funeral.
- Ray Quinn (Michael Reilly Burke), Love and Forty's father.
- Alec Grigoryan (David Paladino), a private investigator hired by Love to investigate Candace.
- Gigi (Haven Everly), Will's fiancée.
- Milo Warrington (Andrew Creer), James' best friend and Love's new boyfriend after her breakup with Joe.
- James Kennedy (Daniel Durant), Love's deaf and deceased husband who died of cancer.
- Rachel (Madeline Zima), Candace/Amy's roommate who knows Krav Maga.
- Sofia (Brooke Johnson), Forty's au pair lover who was murdered by Love.

=== Introduced in season three ===
- Natalie Engler (Michaela McManus), Joe's next-door neighbor and the subject of his growing affection. Natalie is in an unhappy marriage to tech mogul Matthew Engler, and attempts to initiate an affair with Joe, who declines out of loyalty to Love, despite his obsession with Natalie. Love murders Natalie after finding Joe's collection of her paraphernalia.
- Detective Ruthie Falco (Romy Rosemont), a detective searching for Natalie.
- Detective Acacia Kim (Georgia Leva), a detective searching for Natalie.
- Margaret Brigham (Terryn Westbrook), Gil’s wife and Zoe and Alan’s mother.
- The doctor (Mercedes Colon) who treats Henry when he has measles.
- Derek (Noah Bentley), a bully from Joe’s past in the orphanage.
- Jean Peck (Marcia Cross), a business associate at Matthew’s company.
- Dr. Laura Kealy (Ginifer King), a successful self-help author for working moms.
- Leez (Monica Day), a talented coder who works for Matthew’s company.
