= Saturn Award for Best Actress in a Streaming Television Series =

Annual US media award

Saturn Award for Best Actress in Streaming Television Series
- Awarded for: Best performance of the year by a female in a leading role in a streaming presentation
- Country: United States
- Presented by: Academy of Science Fiction, Fantasy and Horror Films
- First award: 2018
- Website: www.saturnawards.org

The Saturn Award for Best Actress in a Streaming Television Series is one of the annual awards given by the American professional organization, the Academy of Science Fiction, Fantasy and Horror Films. The Saturn Awards are the oldest film-specialized awards to reward science fiction, fantasy, and horror achievements (the Hugo Award for Best Dramatic Presentation, awarded by the World Science Fiction Society who reward science fiction and fantasy in various media, is the oldest award for science fiction and fantasy films).

The award was introduced at the 45th Saturn Awards, honoring the best performances by actresses in streaming presentations. It was not held at the 46th Saturn Awards but returned at the 47th Saturn Awards under its current name.

== Nominees ==
Year	Actress	Television Program	Streaming Service	Character
2018/2019 (45th)	Sonequa Martin-Green	Star Trek: Discovery	CBS All Access	Michael Burnham
2018/2019 (45th)	Carla Gugino	The Haunting of Hill House	Netflix	Olivia Crain
2018/2019 (45th)	Elizabeth Lail	You	Netflix	Guinevere Beck
2018/2019 (45th)	Natasha Lyonne	Russian Doll	Netflix	Nadia Vulvokov
2018/2019 (45th)	Molly Parker	Lost in Space	Netflix	Maureen Robinson
2018/2019 (45th)	Krysten Ritter	Jessica Jones	Netflix	Jessica Jones
2018/2019 (45th)	Kiernan Shipka	Chilling Adventures of Sabrina	Netflix	Sabrina Spellman
2019/2020 (46th)	Not presented			
2021/2022 (50th)	Ming-Na Wen	The Book of Boba Fett	Disney+	Fennec Shand
2021/2022 (50th)	Millie Bobby Brown	Stranger Things	Netflix	Eleven
2021/2022 (50th)	Britt Lower	Severance	Apple TV+	Helly R.
2021/2022 (50th)	Erin Moriarty	The Boys	Amazon Prime Video	Annie January/Starlight
2021/2022 (50th)	Elizabeth Olsen	WandaVision	Disney+	Wanda Maximoff/Scarlet Witch
2021/2022 (50th)	Beth Riesgraf	Leverage: Redemption	Amazon Freevee	Parker
2021/2022 (50th)	Kate Siegel	Midnight Mass	Netflix	Erin Greene

== See also ==
- Saturn Award for Best Actress on Television
