= You season 4 =

You
- Season 4
- Promotional poster
- Showrunner: Sera Gamble
- Starring: Penn Badgley; Tati Gabrielle; Charlotte Ritchie; Tilly Keeper; Amy-Leigh Hickman; Ed Speleers; Lukas Gage
- No. of episodes: 10

Release
- Original network: Netflix
- Original release: February 9 – March 9, 2023

Season chronology
- ← Previous; Season 3 Next → Season 5

The fourth season of the American psychological thriller television series You was ordered by Netflix on October 13, 2021. You series co-creator Sera Gamble returns as showrunner. Series star Penn Badgley returns as Joe Goldberg and Tati Gabrielle reprises her role as Marienne Bellamy, with Charlotte Ritchie, Tilly Keeper, Amy-Leigh Hickman, Ed Speleers and Lukas Gage joining the main cast. Filming began in March 2022, primarily in London, and concluded in August. The season was split in two parts, with the first part premiering on February 9, 2023, and the second part premiered on March 9, 2023.

== Cast ==
=== Main ===
- Penn Badgley as Joe Goldberg, a serial killer and university professor under the alias Jonathan Moore
- Tati Gabrielle as Marienne Bellamy, Joe's former love interest
- Charlotte Ritchie as Kate Galvin, an icy and adversarial gallery manager in whom Joe takes an interest
- Tilly Keeper as Lady Phoebe, a notorious but kind-hearted socialite hailing from an aristocratic family, and Kate's best friend
- Amy-Leigh Hickman as Nadia Farran, a literature major in Joe's class
- Ed Speleers as Rhys Montrose, an author whose memoir lifted him out of poverty, got him into Oxford and helped him launch a political career
- Lukas Gage as Adam Pratt, an American expatriate who is the wealthy, playboy son of a prominent East Coast family, and is dating Phoebe

=== Recurring ===
- Stephen Hagan as Malcolm Harding, a literature professor and partying, drug-loving bon vivant who lives in the apartment across from Joe.
- Adam James as Elliot Tannenberg, a fixer working for Love's family who gives Joe his cover identity in London
- Aidan Cheng as Simon Soo, an aspiring artist and son of a Chinese tech mogul
- Niccy Lin as Sophie Soo, a social media influencer and Simon's sister
- Eve Austin as Gemma Graham-Greene, a pompous socialite in the Oxford friend group
- Ozioma Whenu as Blessing Bosede, a successful Nigerian princess with multiple university degrees from Oxford and a member of the friendship group
- Sean Pertwee as Vic, Phoebe's personal driver and bodyguard
- Ben Wiggins as Roald Walker-Burton, an aristocrat and Kate's childhood friend
- Dario Coates as Connie, a sportsman who is a part of the Oxford friendship group
- Brad Alexander as Edward, a student in Joe's class. He has a fierce academic rivalry with Nadia, who he goes on to date.
- Alison Pargeter as Dawn Brown, a paparazzi photographer who is obsessed with Lady Phoebe
- Greg Kinnear as Tom Lockwood, Kate's estranged American father who is a powerful activist shareholder in a number of shady business dealings

=== Guest ===
- Victoria Pedretti as Love Quinn
- Elizabeth Lail as Guinevere Beck

== Episodes ==
No. overall	No. in season	Title	Directed by	Written by	Original release date
Part 1
31	1	"Joe Takes a Holiday"	John Scott	Sera Gamble & Leo Richardson	February 9, 2023
In a flashback, Joe Goldberg tracks down Marienne in London, but chooses to let her go after she calls him a murderer. Joe is later met by Elliot Tannenberg, a fixer working for Love's father, who sets him up with a cover identity in exchange for killing Marienne to tie up loose ends. Joe instead pickpockets Marienne's necklace and sends its picture to Elliot to make it appear he killed her. In the present, Joe lives under his new identity as "Jonathan Moore", a university English professor. He develops an interest in Kate Galvin, the girlfriend of his obnoxious fellow professor Malcolm Harding, who lives in the flat across from him. Joe saves Kate from two muggers; to repay him, Malcolm invites him to a party at the elite Sundry House, where Joe befriends author and mayoral hopeful Rhys Montrose. Joe gets heavily intoxicated at the party and awakens in his flat to find Malcolm stabbed to death and missing a finger. Assuming he killed Malcolm before blacking out, Joe disposes of his body. The next day, Kate invites Joe to dinner. As Joe arrives, he receives a series of anonymous texts from Malcolm's real killer, thanking him for disposing of the evidence.
32	2	"Portrait of the Artist"	John Scott	Kara Lee Corthron & Neil Reynolds	February 9, 2023
Lady Phoebe, Kate's aristocrat best friend, invites Joe to an art exhibition curated by Kate and featuring the work of Simon Soo, a billionaire's son in their friend circle. Joe breaks into Malcolm's office and finds a ledger of gambling debts and various codenamed contacts. Joe follows Phoebe's boyfriend Adam Pratt, an American expat who owns Sundry House, and discovers he has a fetish for being urinated on by men, before Adam's bodyguard Vic thwarts him. At the exhibition, Simon's art is vandalized by a woman that Joe and Kate later learn is the real artist behind the paintings, whom Simon got addicted to drugs to discredit her. Joe recalls a reference to the artwork in Malcolm's ledger and believes Simon killed Malcolm to avoid being extorted; however, Simon is murdered that night, with the killer cutting off one of his ears. Joe returns home to find his wall covered in newspaper clippings from his past, the killer having deduced his real identity.
33	3	"Eat the Rich"	Shamim Sarif	Justin W. Lo & Mairin Reed	February 9, 2023
The killer sends Malcolm's finger to the press, and is dubbed the "Eat-the-Rich Killer". Joe discovers his student Nadia was in a sexual relationship with Malcolm. At Simon's funeral, the killer orders Joe to kill Kate. Joe follows Kate around to protect her; though initially cold to Joe, Kate eventually opens up to him and the two have sex, unaware that Vic is watching them. The next day, Joe follows Kate to a crypt where she pays respects to Malcolm; after she leaves, Vic, who was following Joe, searches him at gunpoint and finds Malcolm's ring, which Joe realizes was planted on him. A struggle ensues, forcing Joe to kill Vic. The killer suggests Joe is aroused by murder; Joe plays along and tells the killer to let him finish Kate, and the killer arranges a meeting with him. Phoebe calls Joe to Sundry House, where the police are waiting to question him.
34	4	"Hampsie"	Harry Jierjian	Michael Foley & Amanda Johnson-Zetterström	February 9, 2023
Joe is invited to Phoebe's family's country manor for a weekend getaway. He observes her friends, particularly a socialite named Gemma, behaving callously to the servants. Joe shuts down Phoebe's attempt to seduce him, and she instead confides her concern that Adam does not love her. Adam, meanwhile, tells Joe he plans to propose to Phoebe, in part because her family fortune will rescue him from mounting debts. Joe comes at odds with Roald Walker-Burton, Kate's childhood friend who, as Joe discovers, is obsessed with her. At dinner, Roald chastises Kate for not accepting herself as "one of them", while Gemma accuses Joe of being the killer. Kate later reveals to Joe that her father is a powerful investor with whom she cut ties due to the harm his business dealings have done to the world. Joe realizes he may be in love with Kate. Roald confronts Joe about being the killer, and pushes him out of a second-story window. Joe recovers and hears a scream; he runs to find Kate, only to discover her kneeling over Gemma's corpse with a knife in hand.
35	5	"The Fox and the Hound"	Harry Jierjian	Hillary Benefiel & Dylan Cohen	February 9, 2023
Kate insists she did not kill Gemma. Joe comes to believe her and helps her dispose of the body in a barn while the others are partying. Kate confronts Joe about his past after noticing his apparent experience with covering up murders; Joe admits that he disposed of Malcolm's body, and that whoever framed him is now trying to frame Kate. Kate goes to tell Phoebe to dismiss the servant staff; while she is away, Roald discovers Joe in the barn and brings him to the others, accusing him of being the killer. Despite Joe's protests, Roald gives him a headstart to flee before pursuing him with a shotgun. Joe subdues Roald in the woods, only to be captured and placed in a dungeon by the real killer: Rhys, who, having come from poverty, committed the murders out of hatred towards the rich. Rhys tells Joe to kill Roald so they can frame him for the murders. When Joe refuses, Rhys sets the dungeon on fire and leaves; Joe escapes and frees Roald, and the two are rescued by Kate. Joe does not tell the others about Rhys, and vows to bring him down himself. Rhys announces his candidacy for Mayor of London.
Part 2
36	6	"Best of Friends"	John Scott	Justin W. Lo & Leo Richardson	March 9, 2023
Rhys forces Joe to find someone to frame for the murders, and places Simon's severed ear in his freezer. Joe initially plans to frame Connie, a member of the Oxford group who confides his struggles with addiction, but later relents when Connie decides to get clean. At Kate's latest gallery fundraiser, Phoebe is held captive in a hotel room by Dawn, a woman posing as a waitress, who has a parasocial obsession with her. Joe negotiates his way into the room and plants Simon's ear in Dawn's bag before the police arrive, thus getting Dawn arrested for the "Eat the Rich" murders. Nadia, who witnesses the arrest, becomes suspicious of Joe. Adam proposes to Phoebe, but Phoebe, who learned of his financial problems from Dawn, rejects him. Joe and Kate admit their feelings for one another after Kate promises not to inquire into Joe's past. Rhys gives Joe a final task: kill his rival political donor Tom Lockwood, Kate's father.
37	7	"Good Man, Cruel World"	Rachel Leiterman	Ab Chao & Neil Reynolds	March 9, 2023
Joe accompanies Kate to dinner with her father, who is visiting London; Lockwood reveals he knows Joe's real identity. Lockwood soon gets an article published revealing that Rhys fabricated much of his memoir. Rhys reveals he has kidnapped Marienne, and forces Joe to kill Lockwood to save her. Phoebe struggles with PTSD symptoms after her kidnapping; Kate arranges her stay at a clinic, but Phoebe instead decides to marry Adam. Joe prepares to kill Lockwood, but Lockwood instead enlists him to kill Rhys, giving him the location of a countryside cottage where Rhys has gone into hiding since the publication of the exposé. Joe finds Rhys, who claims he doesn't know who Joe is. Joe tortures Rhys for Marienne's location; Rhys pleads his innocence, but Joe ends up killing him, only to then discover that the "Rhys" he has been interacting with has been a figment of his imagination. Nadia, meanwhile, finds a key in Joe's apartment that leads to a room where Marienne has been trapped in a glass cage.
38	8	"Where Are You Going, Where Have You Been?"	Rachel Leiterman	Kara Lee Corthron & Mairin Reed	March 9, 2023
Joe is revealed to have drugged and kidnapped Marienne before she could leave London, and locked her in a glass cage in the basement of an abandoned building across from Rhys' favorite restaurant. Joe had been exhaustively researching Rhys' life, finding commonalities between Rhys' story of rising out of a life of crime and poverty and his own desire for moral redemption. Upon imprisoning Marienne, Joe suffered a psychotic break that caused him to dissociate, resulting in gaps in his memory where he kidnapped Marienne and later committed the murders. Having forgotten he kidnapped Marienne, Joe left her to starve in the cage. The "Rhys" in Joe's visions proclaims himself to be a figment of his darker impulses, and helps him remember where he kept the key to Marienne's location. Joe arrives at the building at the same time Nadia explains to Marienne her plan to help her escape.
39	9	"She's Not There"	Penn Badgley	Hillary Benefiel & Amanda Johnson-Zetterström	March 9, 2023
Nadia manages to hide while a horrified Joe finds Marienne and promises to set her free. Nadia later procures ketamine from her boyfriend Edward to use on Joe. Joe and Kate attend Adam and Phoebe's wedding party and attempt to convince Phoebe, whose mental state has declined, not to marry Adam. Phoebe is later committed to psychiatric care after suffering a breakdown at the party. Adam is killed by hitmen posing as prostitutes, who, as Kate learns, were sent by her father; she refuses his request to take over his business. Joe takes Phoebe's diazepam to expunge his visions of Rhys, but experiences a nightmare in which he sees Gemma, Beck and Love, which convinces him the only way to end his obsessive cycle is to kill himself. He awakens to go free Marienne, only to find she overdosed on medication he left for her earlier.
40	10	"The Death of Jonathan Moore"	Harry Jierjian	Michael Foley & Sera Gamble	March 9, 2023
Believing Marienne to have died, Joe disposes of her body at a park to make her look like she overdosed. Nadia, however, tells Edward that she and Marienne plotted to fake the latter's death by replacing her medication with beta blockers that lowered her blood pressure, so that she could escape. Kate tells Joe that her father revealed himself to have bankrolled her every venture even after their estrangement, and confides her fear of never escaping his control. Joe kills Lockwood, and the next morning, attempts suicide by jumping off a bridge. However, the police rescue him; he awakens in the hospital to find Kate, who tells him she has inherited all her father's assets, and has already covered up Joe's involvement in Rhys' death. Joe decides to embrace his darker half; he kills Edward and frames Nadia for the crime. Sophie and Princess Blessing buy Sundry House, which Roald and Connie continue to frequent with no signs of change; after rehab, Lady Phoebe moves to Thailand to teach children. While Marienne reads an article about Joe while safely home with Juliette back in Paris, Joe moves back to New York City with Kate, who runs her father's business after his death and helps Joe rehabilitate his public image as Love's escaped victim.

== Production ==
=== Development ===
On October 13, 2021, ahead of the third season premiere, You was renewed by Netflix for a fourth season.

=== Writing ===
The season is primarily set in London, the first time outside the United States, and showrunner Sera Gamble said protagonist Joe Goldberg is "great when he's in an environment that's not natural to him, that's foreign to him". Part of the decision to set the story in another country arose from Gamble's decision to explore the world further after watching many other international series on Netflix while quarantining during the COVID-19 pandemic. The story is also briefly set in Paris, the idea being co-creator Greg Berlanti's, and Gamble noted that since it is not a familiar place to Joe, he is like a "fish out of water". Penn Badgley, who portrays Joe, said that while the fourth season would retain the tone of the series, "We're using a different format [...] It's almost like we're shifting the genre slightly". The first half of the season is structured like a whodunit, while the second half takes inspiration from Fight Club.

=== Casting ===
In February 2022, Lukas Gage was cast as a series regular for the season. A month later, Charlotte Ritchie was also cast as a regular. Tati Gabrielle was also confirmed to be returning from the third season, though unclear in what capacity. In April 2022, Tilly Keeper, Amy-Leigh Hickman, and Ed Speleers were cast as new series regulars, with Gabrielle confirmed to be returning as a regular, while Niccy Lin, Aidan Cheng, Stephen Hagan, Ben Wiggins, Eve Austin, Ozioma Whenu, Dario Coates, Sean Pertwee, Brad Alexander, Alison Pargeter and Adam James joined the cast in recurring roles for the fourth season. Jenna Ortega had been offered to reprise her role of Ellie Alves from the second season, but declined due to scheduling conflicts with the TV series Wednesday. Victoria Pedretti and Elizabeth Lail made special guest appearances as Love Quinn and Guinevere Beck, respectively, in the second half of the season.

=== Filming ===
Principal photography began on March 22, 2022, in the United Kingdom, and wrapped in late August. Filming took place in locations including Royal Holloway, University of London, Four Seasons Hotel London, and the River Thames. Badgley made his directorial debut with the ninth episode of the season. The season features fewer intimate sex scenes than previous seasons in accordance with Badgley's wishes, citing his discomfort with such scenes.

== Release ==
The season was split into two five-episode parts, with the first part premiering on February 9, 2023, and the second on March 9.

== Reception ==
For the fourth season, the review aggregator website Rotten Tomatoes reported a 92% approval rating with an average rating of 7.3/10, based on 53 critic reviews. The website's critics consensus reads, "The hunter becomes prey in You's London-set fourth season, which shows some wear as this premise begins to outlive its believability—but Penn Badgley's sardonic performance continues to paper over most lapses in logic." For the first part of season 4, Metacritic, which uses a weighted average, assigned a score of 73 out of 100 based on 20 critics, indicating "generally favorable" reviews. For the second part of season 4, Metacritic, which uses a weighted average, assigned a score of 82 out of 100 based on 8 critics, indicating "universal acclaim".

Media Play News, citing U.S. streaming estimates from PlumResearch, reported that season four of You generated 3.0 million unique viewers on Netflix during the week ending April 2, 2023, with an average time spent of 134 minutes.
