= Tilly Keeper =

English actress (born 1997)

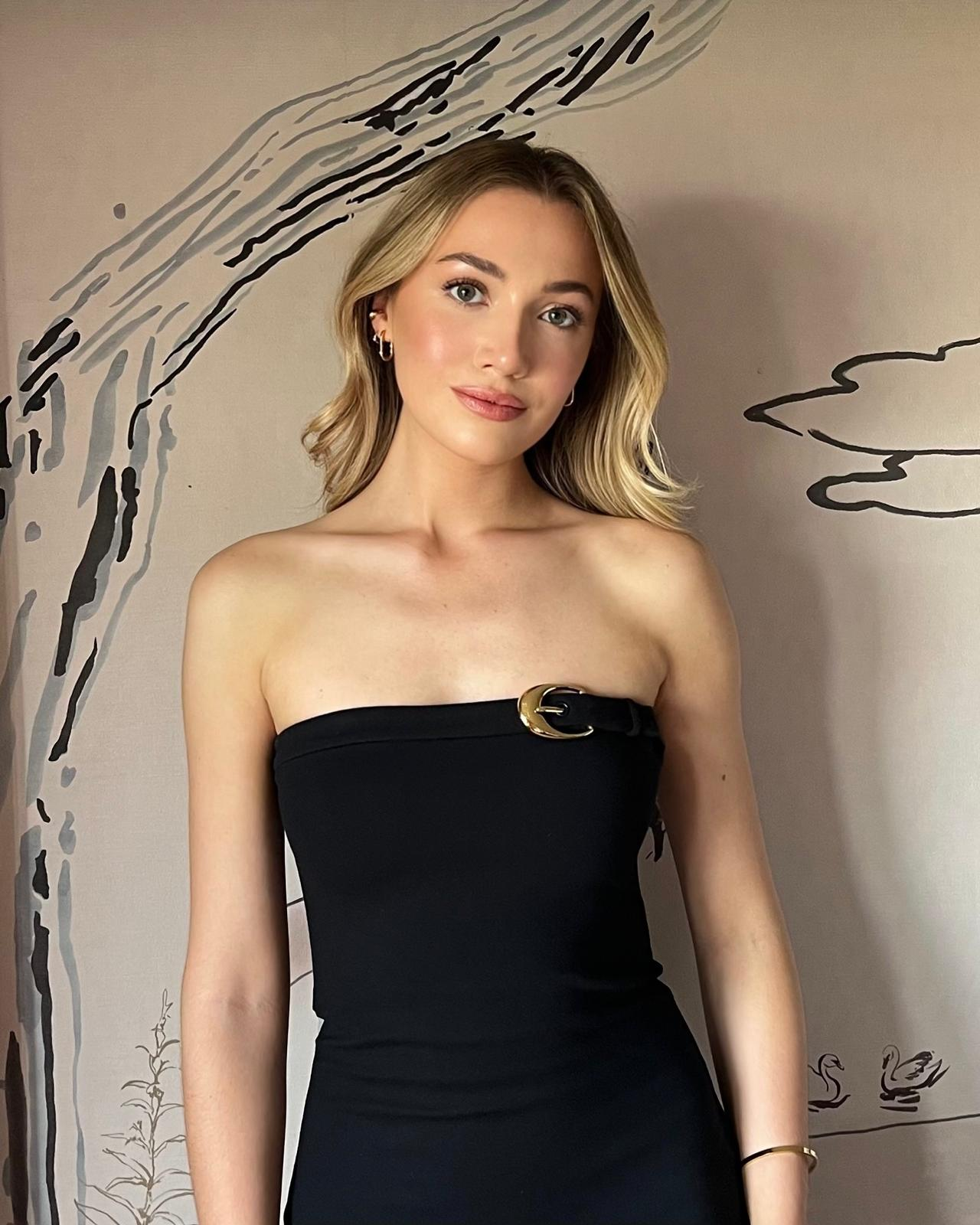
- Keeper in 2026
- Born: Matilda Elizabeth Keeper; 16 August 1997 (age 29); Chislehurst, Bromley, England
- Education: Bromley High School
- Occupation: Actress
- Years active: 2004–present

Matilda Elizabeth Keeper (born 16 August 1997) is an English actress. From 2016 to 2020, she portrayed Louise Mitchell in the BBC soap opera EastEnders. After her exit from the soap, she starred as Helen in the BBC film Make Me Famous (2020), and has since played Lady Phoebe Borehall-Blaxworth in the Netflix series You (2023–2025) and Darcy Pike in the Channel 4 sitcom Queenie (2024).

== Early life ==
Keeper was born in Chislehurst, in the London Borough of Bromley. She was premature, born at just 33 weeks old. Keeper also has two brothers. She attended the D&B Academy of Performing Arts in Bromley for 14 years. From the age of 4, Keeper took ballet lessons, before joining their agency at the age of 7. Keeper attended Bromley High School.

== Career ==
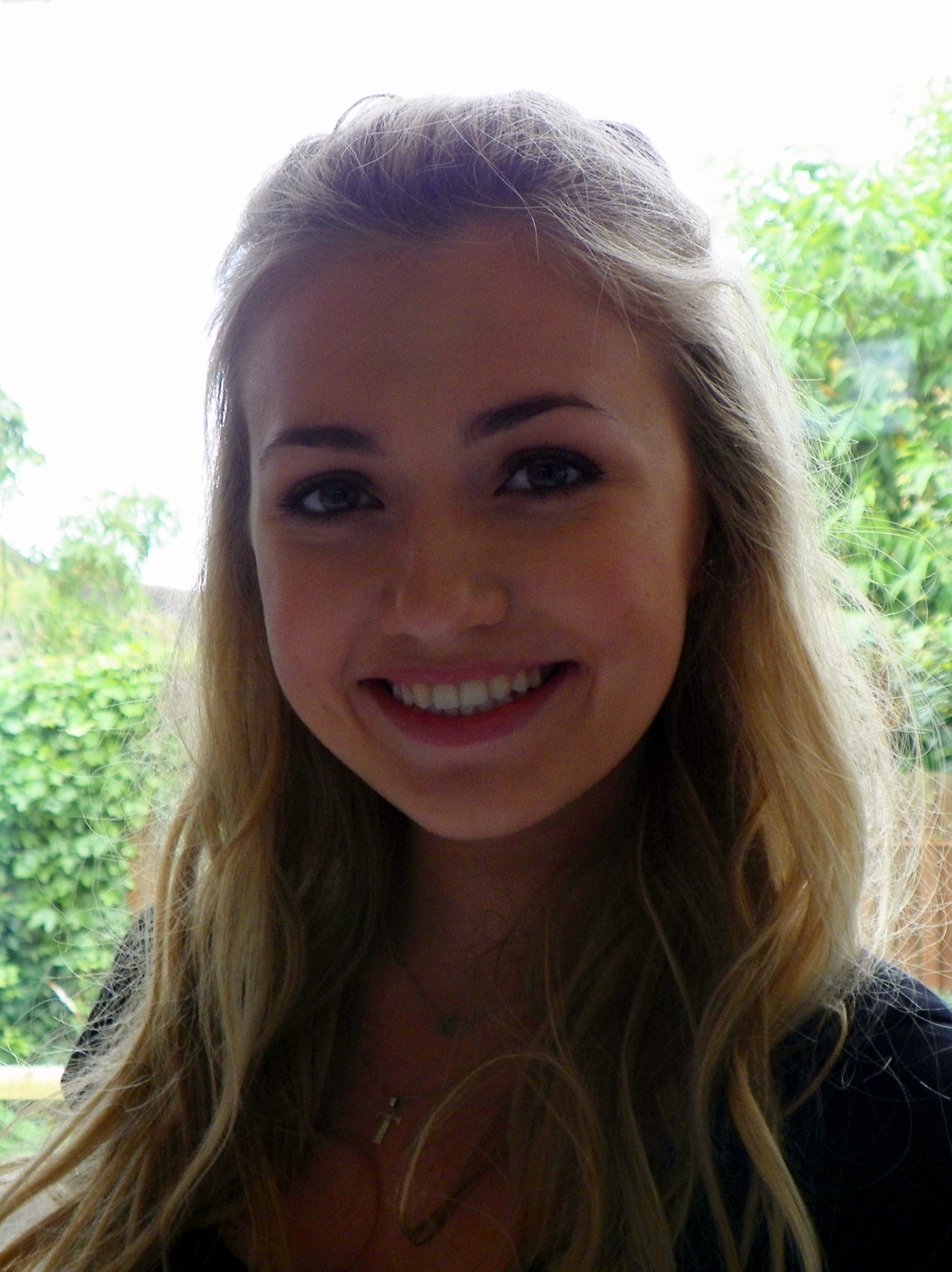
Keeper at an EastEnders event at BBC Elstree Centre in 2016.

Keeper began her career in 2004 when she made appearances in television advertisements. She then made her debut stage appearance in a production of Dick Whittington. Her television debut was as an uncredited school student in an episode of the ITV procedural drama The Bill. She then appeared in a theatre production of Oliver from March to July 2009, where she played a member of the Sovereign's team. In 2014, she appeared as a dancer in the film Cuban Fury, and later appeared in an Oral-B advert and the 2015 short film Female Dog. In 2016, Keeper made her television debut in an episode of the CBBC series Millie Inbetween.

In December 2015, Keeper was cast in the role of Louise Mitchell in the BBC soap opera EastEnders, appearing from 15 January 2016. Her storylines have included her father Phil's (Steve McFadden) alcoholism, being in a bus crash, getting caught in a fire causing her to have permanent burns, her mother's mental health issues, getting kidnapped, and becoming pregnant with Keanu Taylor's (Danny Walters) child. In December 2019, it was announced that Keeper had made the decision to depart from EastEnders, with her final scenes airing on 24 January 2020. In April 2020, it was announced that Keeper would star in the BBC Three film Make Me Famous as Helen Cott. On her casting, she stated: "I'm thrilled to be a part of this project. It's a really important story that I think we could all learn something from."

In 2021, she co-starred in the short film True Colours alongside Amy-Leigh Hickman. She then starred in the short film Do This For Me as Kat. In June 2021, it was announced that Keeper would star as Emily in the British psychological thriller Marooned Awakening. Principal photography took place on the island of Guernsey in September 2021. The film premiered in September 2022. In 2022, it was announced that Keeper had been cast as Lady Phoebe in the fourth series of the Netflix series You. A year later, she was announced as a main cast member for the Channel 4 drama series Queenie. In 2025, she reprised her role as Lady Phoebe for the fifth and final series of You. In 2026, she was cast in the upcoming BBC legal drama series Reputation.

== Filmography ==
Year	Title	Role	Notes
2008	The Bill	School Girl	1 episode
2011	Let's Dance for Comic Relief	Dancer	Television special
2014	Cuban Fury	Dancer	Feature film
2015	Female Dog	Grace	Short film
2016	Millie Inbetween	Chrissie	Episode: "Loved Up"
2016–2020	EastEnders	Louise Mitchell	Regular role; 393 episodes
2017	The One Show	Herself	Guest appearance
2018	Children in Need	Princess Jasmine	Television special
2019	This Morning	Herself	Guest appearance
2020	Make Me Famous	Helen Cott	Television film
2021	True Colours	Chloe	Short film
2021	Do This For Me	Kat	Short film
2022	Marooned Awakening	Emily	Feature film
2022	R.I.P.D. 2: Rise of the Damned	Charlotte Pulsipher	Direct-to-video film
2023–2025	You	Lady Phoebe Borehall-Blaxworth	Main role (series 4); guest role (series 5)
2024	Queenie	Darcy Pike	Main role
TBA	Reputation	Chelsea	Main role

== Stage ==
Year	Title	Role	Ref.
2005	Dick Whittington	Babe	
2006	Snow White and the Seven Dwarfs	Babe	
2009	Oliver	Workhouse Child	

== Awards and nominations ==
Year	Award	Category	Nominated work	Result	Ref.
2016	TV Choice Awards	Best Soap Newcomer	EastEnders	Longlisted	
2016	TV Times Awards	Favourite Newcomer	EastEnders	Nominated	
2016	Inside Soap Awards	Best Newcomer	EastEnders	Longlisted	
2017	National Television Awards	Newcomer	EastEnders	Nominated	
2023	National Film Awards UK	Best Supporting Actress in a TV Series	You	Nominated	
