= Elizabeth Lail =

American actress (born 1992)

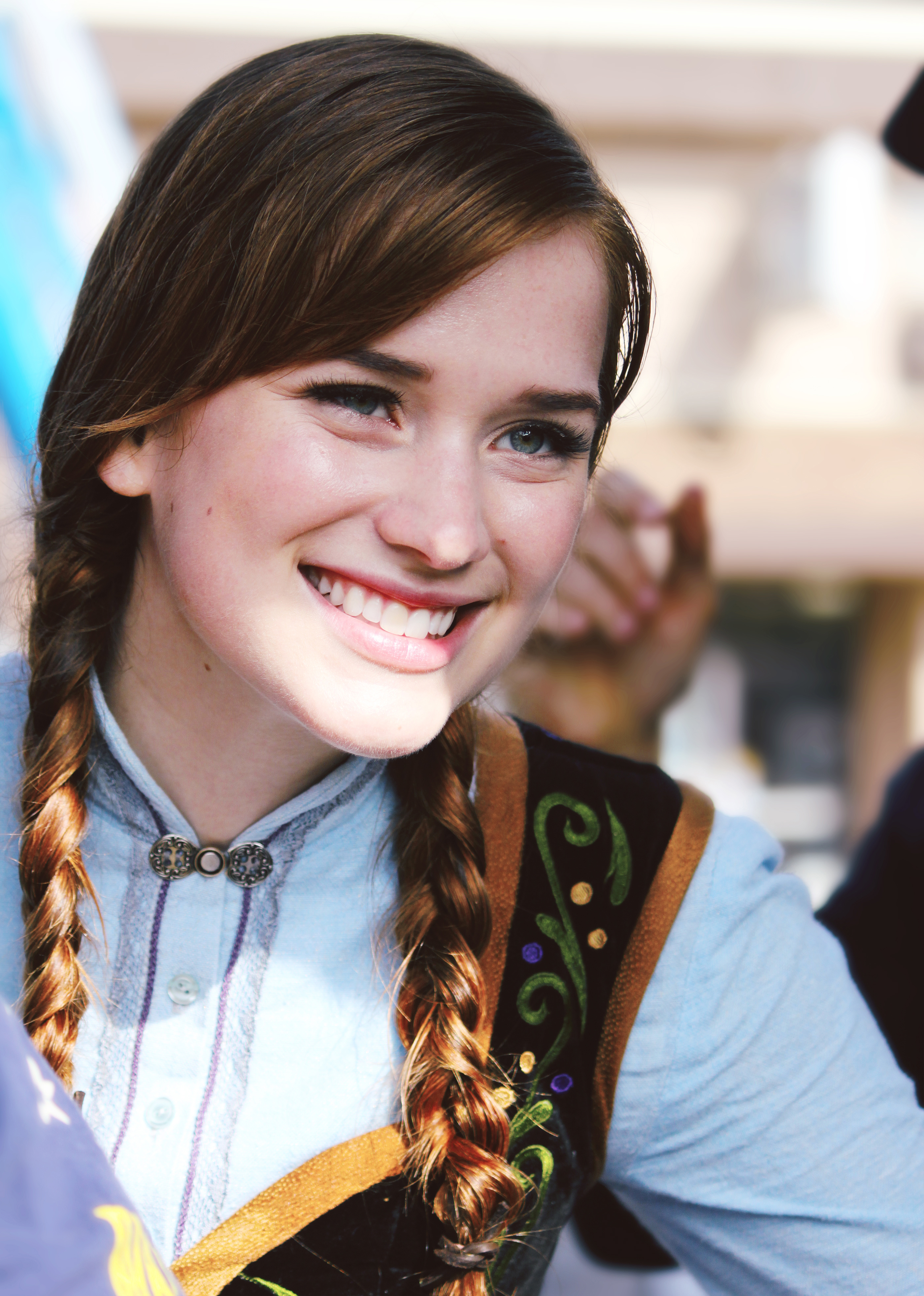
- Lail as Anna in Once Upon a Time in 2014
- Born: Elizabeth Dean Lail; March 25, 1992 (age 34); Asheboro, North Carolina, U.S.
- Education: University of North Carolina School of the Arts (BFA)
- Occupation: Actress
- Years active: 2011–present
- Spouse: Nieku Manshadi (m. 2021)

Elizabeth Dean Lail (born March 25, 1992) is an American actress. She is known for portraying Anna in the fantasy series Once Upon a Time (2014), Guinevere Beck in the thriller series You (2018–2025) and Vanessa Afton in the Five Nights at Freddy's films (2023–2027).

Lail has appeared in the horror series Dead of Summer (2016), the Gossip Girl spin-off (2021), and the drama series Ordinary Joe (2021–2022) and Elsbeth (2024–2025). She also starred in the horror film Countdown (2019) and the comedy film Mack & Rita (2022).

== Early life ==
Lail was born in Asheboro, North Carolina. She became interested in acting at age 14, after playing a small role in a community theater production of Seven Brides for Seven Brothers. After graduating from Asheboro High School in 2010, she attended the University of North Carolina School of the Arts, graduating with a B.F.A. degree in Drama in May 2014.

== Career ==
Lail mostly worked in student short film productions, such as Model Airplane and the lesbian-themed Without, while in university from 2011 to 2014. She had moved to New York City to pursue stage work when she landed an audition for ABC's Once Upon a Time, after which she was cast as Anna in the fourth season of the series, released in 2014. Lail was cast in a starring role in the 2016 Freeform horror series Dead of Summer, playing the role of camp counselor Amy.

In 2017, Lail was cast as Guinevere Beck in the Lifetime/Netflix television series You, opposite Penn Badgley and Shay Mitchell. Released in 2018, she received a nomination for Best Actress in Streaming Presentation at the 45th Saturn Awards. Lail reprised her role as Guinevere Beck in guest appearances on the second, fourth, and fifth seasons of You. Lail played the lead, Quinn Harris, in the 2019 horror film Countdown.

In 2020, she and other television stars contributed their voices to the brief public service announcement about ending live-shackle slaughter of chickens for Mercy for Animals. She would again provide voiceover for Mercy for Animals for 2024's Voices of Hope ~ Words of Wisdom by Dr. Jane Goodall. In 2025, Mercy for Animals posted a clip of Lail discussing her advocacy for veganism.

In March 2021, Lail played the title role of Mack in the comedy film Mack & Rita, playing a younger version of Diane Keaton; she also joined the cast of the HBO Max teen drama Gossip Girl, in the recurring role of Lola Morgan. The same month, it was revealed that Lail had joined the cast of the NBC drama series Ordinary Joe.

In January 2023, Lail was cast as Vanessa in the film adaptation of Five Nights at Freddy's, which premiered in October of that same year to commercial success.

From June to August 2025, Lail played Eva in Not About Nightingales at the Williamstown Film Festival. She performed alongside names such as William Jackson Harper, Joe Goldammer, Dan Katz, Malik James, Chris Messina, Annie McNamara, and several others. It was her second professional theatre production. In late 2025, she starred in the film adaptation of Five Nights at Freddy's 2, reprising her role as Vanessa Afton.

In April 2026, Lail was cast as Zoe in the fourth and final season of the Netflix series The Night Agent.

== Personal life ==
In April 2021, Lail married pediatric dentist Nieku Manshadi at Hasbrouck House in Stone Ridge, New York.

== Filmography ==
=== Film ===
Year	Title	Role	Notes
2018	Unintended	Lea	
2019	Countdown	Quinn Harris	
2022	Mack & Rita	Mackenzie "Mack" Martin	
2023	Gonzo Girl	Devaney Peltier	
2023	Five Nights at Freddy's	Vanessa Afton	
2025	Five Nights at Freddy's 2	Vanessa Afton	

=== Television ===
Year	Title	Role	Notes
2014	Once Upon a Time	Anna	Recurring role (season 4)
2016	Dead of Summer	Amy Hughes	Main role
2017	The Blacklist	Natalie Luca	Episode: "Natalie Luca"
2018	The Good Fight	Emily Chapin	Episode: "Day 478"
2018–2025	You	Guinevere Beck	Main role (season 1); guest role in season 2, 4, 5
2021	Gossip Girl	Lola Morgan	Recurring role (season 1)
2021–2022	Ordinary Joe	Jenny Banks	Main role
2022	Robot Chicken	Anna	Voice role; episode: "May Cause Internal Diarrhea"
2024–2025	Elsbeth	Quinn Powers	Recurring role
TBA	The Night Agent	Zoe	Main role (season 4)

=== Theater ===
Year	Title	Role	Venue	Notes
2017	Nibbler	Hayley	Rattlestick Playwrights Theater	Off-Broadway
2024	Pretty Perfect Lives	Tiffany	The Flea Theater	Off-Broadway
2025	Not About Nightingales	Eva	Williamstown Theatre Festival	

== Awards and nominations ==
Year	Award	Category	Work	Result	Ref.
2019	Saturn Awards	Best Actress in a Streaming Television Series	You	Nominated	
