= Charlotte Ritchie =

British actress (born 1989)

- Born: 1989 or 1990 (age 36–37); Clapham, London, England
- Education: University of Bristol
- Occupation: Actress
- Years active: 2004–present

Charlotte Ritchie (born 1989 or 1990) is an English actress. She is best known on television as Nurse Barbara Gilbert in Call the Midwife (2015–2018) and Alison Cooper in Ghosts (2019–2023).

Ritchie's mainstream career began with her role as Oregon in Fresh Meat, before going on to appear as Hannah French in Siblings, Alison in Dead Pixels, George Lawson in Feel Good and Kate Lockwood in You. She was a member of the classical crossover group All Angels.

== Early life and education ==
Charlotte Ritchie was born in Clapham, London, in 1989 or 1990. She was educated at James Allen's Girls' School in Dulwich, and joined Youth Music Theatre UK and its production of Red Hunter in 2005.

She gained a degree in English and drama at the University of Bristol while filming Fresh Meat in her final year.

== Career ==
In 2004, Ritchie played a lead role in a short film entitled The Open Doors with Welsh actor Michael Sheen. She appeared as an uncredited extra in the 2005 film Harry Potter and the Goblet of Fire.

Ritchie performed with All Angels in an episode of Emmerdale. She also played Emily Owen, a neighbour in the BBC's Life of Riley.

From 2011 to 2016, Ritchie portrayed Oregon in the Channel 4 comedy series Fresh Meat.

She starred alongside Tom Stourton in the BBC Three sitcom Siblings (2014), and she appeared as a guest panellist in the same year on 8 Out of 10 Cats.

From 2015 to 2018, she played Nurse Barbara Gilbert (later Hereward) in the popular period drama Call the Midwife.

In 2016, she appeared in the UK production of Noël Coward's Private Lives, playing the role of Sibyl Chase.

On New Years Day 2019, Ritchie had the guest starring role of Lin in the Doctor Who episode "Resolution".

From 2019 to 2023, she played Alison, alongside Kiell Smith-Bynoe as Mike, in Ghosts, a BBC sitcom about a young couple who inherit a haunted estate. She returned to the role in the 2026 feature-length Ghosts film: Ghosts: The Possession of Button House. In 2019, she played Alison in Dead Pixels.

She additionally played George in the Channel 4 series Feel Good, co-starring with Mae Martin.

Ritchie was a contestant on series 11 of Channel 4's Taskmaster (2021).

In 2022, Ritchie joined the cast as a series regular on season 4 of You. That same year, she debuted as Bonnie Evans/Davenport in Grantchester.

In 2023, Ritchie appeared in the music video for "The Blades" by the alternative rock band Squid. She appeared as Barbara in the 2023 film Wonka.

In 2026, she also appeared as Environment Agency employee Sophie Harrison in the Channel 4 docudrama Dirty Business. In the Netflix show Legends (2026), Ritchie's portrayal of her character, also named Sophie, was praised for "a quietly stunning and authoritative performance".

She also presented the nine part docuseries For the Record: An Incomplete History of Music for The Cosmic Shambles Network released in 2026. She was praised as being the series 'trump card' and as a 'charming, humanising force'.

== Filmography ==
=== Film ===
| Year | Title | Role | Notes |
|---|---|---|---|
| 2004 | The Open Doors | Vera | |
| 2005 | Harry Potter and the Goblet of Fire | Student | Uncredited extra |
| 2013 | Benny & Jolene | Jolene | |
| 2014 | The Portrait | Eva Burrell | Short film |
| 2016 | Time Traveller's Support Group | Lina | Short film |
| 2018 | Careful How You Go | | Short film |
| 2018 | Man of the Hour | Gemma | Short film |
| 2018 | MatchBox | Imogen | Short film |
| 2019 | Capital | Charlotte Quince-Wheatley | Short film |
| 2021 | REPEAT | Emily Moore | |
| 2023 | Wonka | Barbara | |
| 2024 | The Assessment | Serena | |
| 2025 | Hostages | Charlie | Lead role |
| 2026 | Ghosts: The Possession of Button House | Alison Cooper | |

=== Television ===
| Year | Title | Role | Notes |
|---|---|---|---|
| 2009 | Life of Riley | Emily Owen | |
| 2011–2016 | Fresh Meat | Melissa "Oregon" Shawcross | Main role; 30 episodes |
| 2012 | Doctors | Becky Foley | 2 episodes |
| 2014 | This Thing Called Love | Alice Barber | |
| 2014–2016 | Siblings | Hannah French | Main cast |
| 2015–2018 | Call the Midwife | Nurse Barbara Gilbert | Main role: series 4–7 |
| 2016 | Drunk History UK | Herself (drunk storyteller) | 1 episode S2 E5 |
| 2016 | Raised by Wolves | Ruby | 3 episodes |
| 2016 | Eddie Izzard: Marathon Man for Sport Relief | Narrator | |
| 2019 | Doctor Who | Lin | 1 episode: "Resolution" |
| 2019 | Death in Paradise | Iris Shephard | 1 episode |
| 2019 | Stath Lets Flats | Harriet | 1 episode |
| 2019–2023 | Ghosts | Alison Cooper | Main role; 34 episodes |
| 2019–2021 | Dead Pixels | Alison | Main role; 12 episodes |
| 2020 | McDonald & Dodds | Sgt Irene Ross | 1 episode |
| 2020 | The Other One | Kitty | 1 episode |
| 2020–2021 | Feel Good | George Lawson | Main role; 12 episodes |
| 2021 | Taskmaster | Herself (contestant) | Series 11 |
| 2022–2024 | Grantchester | Bonnie Evans/Bonnie Davenport | Series 7–9 |
| 2023–2025 | You | Kate Lockwood | Main role; seasons 4–5 |
| 2023 | Partygate | Helen MacNamara | TV docudrama |
| 2025 | Code of Silence | DS Ashleigh Francis | Main role; 6 episodes |
| 2026 | Dirty Business | Sophie Harrison | |
| 2026 | Legends | Sophie | Supporting cast; 6 episodes |
| 2026 | For the Record: An Incomplete History of Music | Host | 9 episodes |

=== Video games ===
| Year | Title | Role | Notes |
|---|---|---|---|
| 2014–2016 | Dreamfall Chapters | Zoë Castillo (voice) | Main role |
| 2021 | Bravely Default II | Gloria (voice) | |

=== Theatre and radio ===
| Year | Title | Role | Notes |
|---|---|---|---|
| 2015 | Good Omens | Anathema Device (voice) | Main role |

== Awards and nominations ==
| Year | Award | Category | Work | Result | Ref. |
|---|---|---|---|---|---|
| 2022 | TV Times Awards | Favourite Comedic Performance | Ghosts | Nominated | |
| 2024 | TV Times Awards | Favourite Actor (Comedy) | Ghosts | Nominated | |
| 2025 | TV Choice Awards UK | Best Comedy Performance | Ghosts | Nominated | |
