= Zach Cherry =

American actor (born 1987)

- Cherry at the Toronto International Film Festival world premiere of Babies in 2026
- Born: November 1, 1987 (age 38); Trenton, New Jersey, U.S.
- Education: Amherst College (2010)
- Occupations: Actor; comedian
- Years active: 2015–present
- Spouse: Anabella Cherry (m. 2022)

Zach Cherry (born November 1, 1987) is an American actor and comedian. He has played Woody Thomas on the Amazon Prime series Fallout, Klev in the Marvel Cinematic Universe, and Dylan George on the Apple TV series Severance, for which he received an Emmy nomination for Outstanding Supporting Actor in a Drama Series in 2025.

== Early life and education ==
Cherry was born on November 1, 1987, in Trenton, New Jersey.

He attended Princeton Day School and Amherst College.

== Career ==
Cherry began taking improv lessons in 2011 and was placed on a house team at the Upright Citizens Brigade Theatre in New York in 2017. In the same year, he guest starred as bounty hunter Peter3Fab in the podcast Mission to Zyxx, founded by members of the Upright Citizens Brigade.

In 2018, he played bookstore clerk Ethan Russell in season one of the Netflix series You. He played Wolf on FOX's Duncanville, Pete Holmes's manager Kevin on Crashing (2017–2019), and Norman on I Feel Bad (2018), and had minor roles on Succession and Living with Yourself.

Cherry also played the minor character Klev in two Marvel Studios movies, Spider-Man: Homecoming (2017) and Shang-Chi and the Legend of the Ten Rings (2021), and voiced him in the 2025 animated series Your Friendly Neighborhood Spider-Man.

In 2020, Cherry was cast in a lead role as Dylan George in the ongoing Apple TV series Severance. In 2025, Cherry was nominated for an Emmy Award in the Outstanding Supporting Actor in a Drama Series category for his portrayal as Dylan George.

In August 2022, it was announced that Cherry and actress Ellie Kemper would host the sixth season of The Great American Baking Show, an American adaptation of the baking reality TV show The Great British Bake Off. The season aired on streaming television service The Roku Channel. Cherry returned for the seventh season in 2024, with new co-host Casey Wilson.

== Personal life ==
Cherry lives in the Bushwick neighborhood of Brooklyn with his wife, Anabella, an ESL teacher, and their rescue dog. He is an avid gamer. Cherry was a vegetarian but announced on the Doughboys podcast that “Meat’s back on the menu, boys!”

== Selected filmography ==
=== Film ===
Year	Title	Role	Notes
2017	The Big Sick	Party Goer 4	
2017	Spider-Man: Homecoming	Klev	
2018	An Evening with Beverly Luff Linn	Tyrone Paris	
2018	Irreplaceable You	Jim	
2018	Unsane	Denis	
2019	Isn't It Romantic	Co-Worker	
2020	Drunk Bus	Josh	Uncredited
2021	Shang-Chi and the Legend of the Ten Rings	Klev	
2023	You Hurt My Feelings	Jim	
2025	The Dinner Plan	PJ	Short film
2026	Teenage Sex and Death at Camp Miasma	Will	
2026	The Breadwinner	Dan	
2026	All Night Wrong	Gary	
2026	Caity	Todd	
2026	Never Change!	Todd Hutchinson	
2026	72 Hours	Barry	
2026	Babies	Ethan	
2026	Resident Evil	Carl	

Key
†	Denotes films that have not yet been released

=== Television ===
Year	Title	Role	Notes	Ref.
2015	High Maintenance	Diabetic Man	Episode: "Sufjan"	
2015	Broad City	Bystander	Episode: "The Matrix"	
2016	Horace and Pete	Young Hipster 1	Episode #1.1	
2016	Unbreakable Kimmy Schmidt	Administrator	Episode: "Kimmy Gives Up!"	
2016	The Jim Gaffigan Show	Male Comedian	Episode: "The List"	
2016	Search Party	Duncan	3 episodes	
2017–2019	Crashing	Kevin Woods	Recurring role	
2018	Divorce		Episode: "Ohio"	
2018	The Chris Gethard Show	Roger, the Leader of the Cave Maniacs	Episode: "Survive the Apocalypse"	
2018	The Special Without Brett Davis	Ethan	Episode: "BBQ"	
2018	I Feel Bad	Norman	Main role	
2018, 2025	You	Ethan Russell	Main cast (season 1); special guest (season 5)	
2018–2020	Our Cartoon President	Various voices	Recurring role	
2019	The Magicians	Frankie Gallo	Episode: "The Bad News Bear"	
2019	Succession	Brian	Episode: "Safe Room"	
2019	Living with Yourself	Hugh	4 episodes	
2019	The Resident	Marcus Broome	Episode: "Peking Duck Day"	
2020	Most Dangerous Game	Looger	Recurring role	
2020	The Last O.G.	Miles	4 episodes	
2020–2022	Duncanville	Wolf (voice)	Main role	
2021	Helpsters	Trophy Todd	Episode: "Trophy Todd"	
2021	Last Week Tonight with John Oliver	Employee 3	Episode: "Union Busting"	
2022–present	Severance	Dylan George	Main role	
2022–2025	The Great American Baking Show	Himself (host)	Main role	
2023	Star Trek: Lower Decks	Ensign Amadou	Episode: "Caves"	
2024	Krapopolis	(voice)	Episode: "Muse Your Illusion"	
2024–2026	Fallout	Woody Thomas	Recurring role; 6 episodes	
2025	Your Friendly Neighborhood Spider-Man	Klev (voice)	Episode: "Scorpion Rising"	
2025	Universal Basic Guys	(voice)	Episode: "Two Marks"	
2026	The Simpsons	Farley (voice)	Episode: "Seperance"	

== Awards and nominations ==
Year	Award	Category	Nominee(s)	Result	Ref.
2022	Actor Awards	Outstanding Performance by an Ensemble in a Drama Series	Severance	Nominated	
2025	Primetime Emmy Awards	Outstanding Supporting Actor in a Drama Series	Severance	Nominated	
2026	Actor Awards	Outstanding Performance by an Ensemble in a Drama Series	Severance	Nominated	
