= Mack & Rita =

2022 comedy film

- Theatrical release poster
- Directed by: Katie Aselton
- Written by: Paul Welsh; Madeline Walter
- Produced by: Alex Saks; Diane Keaton; Stephanie Heaton-Harris; Jina Panebianco; Dori Rath
- Starring: Diane Keaton; Taylour Paige; Elizabeth Lail; Loretta Devine; Amy Hill; Lois Smith; Wendie Malick; Simon Rex; Martin Short; Dustin Milligan
- Cinematography: Sean McElwee
- Edited by: Michael A. Webber
- Music by: Leo Birenberg
- Production companies: Page Fifty-Four Pictures; Rhea Films; Hercules Film Fund; CaliWood Pictures
- Distributed by: Gravitas Premiere
- Release dates: August 10, 2022 (NeueHouse); August 12, 2022 (United States)
- Running time: 95 minutes
- Country: United States
- Language: English
- Budget: $500,000
- Box office: $2.7 million

Mack & Rita is a 2022 American comedy film directed by Katie Aselton, from a screenplay by Madeline Walter and Paul Welsh. The plot follows a 30-year-old woman (Elizabeth Lail) who wakes up as her 70-year-old self (Diane Keaton) after a bachelorette party. Taylour Paige, Loretta Devine, Amy Hill, Lois Smith, Wendie Malick, Simon Rex, Martin Short and Dustin Milligan also star.

The film was released on August 12, 2022, by Gravitas Premiere, to negative reviews from critics, including a Golden Raspberry Award for Worst Actress nomination for Keaton, but the performances of Paige and Milligan were praised.

== Plot ==
Raised by her grandmother, Mack Martin always preferred her company over other children. She learned over time to blend in with them, but felt more comfortable doing more adult activities.

At thirty, Mack has awkward interactions with her peers, so reluctantly plans to join the Palm Springs bachelorette trip for her best friend Carla. She arranges for her neighbor Jack to look after her dog Cheese while she is away, but has difficulty relating with him.

On the first day of the trip, Mack discovers a strange pop-up tent offering the chance to "become her true self". So Carla lets her off the hook for going to an impromptu Bad Bunny show. The proprietor Luca gets Mack to lie inside what looks to be an old tanning bed and talk about who she wants to be.

Wishing to be liberated from the responsibilities of youth, Mack ages into a seventy-year-old woman. She freaks out upon opening the apparatus and seeing her drastically changed image in a mirror. Returning to the house, Carla does not recognise her so tries to throw her out.

Mack calms Carla down by telling her secrets only they know, and confirming the story behind her jewelry. Retracing her steps from when they saw each other earlier, Carla suggests she find the tent and Luca. Equipped with a car, Mack leaves the group, promising to be at the bridal shower. Returning to the tent site, she discovers he moved on.

Mack returns to her apartment, bumps into Jack and assumes the identity of Mack's "aunt" Rita. She tells him they are house-swapping so Mack can work on a second book. 'Rita' ends up going to Carla's shower, where she is introduced to Carla's mom Sharon and her wine club. Carla encourages her to stay positive, then takes her to various activities to trick her body into changing back, to no avail.

Mack's agent calls, reminding her about an upcoming Pilates event she needs to post photos of. Rita gives it a try, but by the time she leaves, she has done most of the exercises weirdly. Arriving back home, Jack talks her into a building-wide activity on the roof.

Later, after the wine club, Rita gets roped into going to her building so Carla's mom can check out Jack. Later, she and Jack go out to lunch where she gets to know him further and a younger woman asks about his status, believing she is his mother.

Freed from the constraints of other people's expectations, Rita comes into her own, becoming an unlikely social media sensation, and sparking a tentative romance with Jack. Faced with an Instagram event on the day of Carla's rehearsal dinner, he convinces her she can try to do both. However, they make her stay too long so she misses the dinner.

Arriving late, Carla chews Mack out for missing the dinner, which Sharon overhears. Then she and the club corner her at home, convincing her to not miss out on her best years. Inspired, Mack hunts down Luca's tent, as Carla had found a flyer for it. Once she is inside the broken tanning bed, a very surprised Luca watches an ecstatic Mack emerge.

Once Mack returns home, Jack stops by, expecting to see Rita. A year passes, in which she has not only gotten together with Jack, but has written her second book. At the book reading, everyone who she interacted with as Rita is there.

== Cast ==
- Diane Keaton as Older Mackenzie "Mack" Martin / "Rita"
  - Elizabeth Lail as Mackenzie "Mack" Martin
  - Molly Duplass as 9 year old Mack
- Taylour Paige as Carla
  - Ayla Rae Nael as Young Carla
- Dustin Milligan as Jack
- Simon Rex as Luca
- Loretta Devine as Sharon
- Wendie Malick as Angela
- Lois Smith as Betty
- Amy Hill as Carol
- Martin Short as the voice of Cheese
- Nicole Byer as Urth
- Patti Harrison as Stephanie
- Aimee Carrero as Sunita
- Addie Weyrich as Ali
- Catherine Carlen as Grammie Martin
- Sara Amini as Michelle
- Lauren Beveridge as Molly

== Production ==
The film initially began development in January 2020, but fell apart amid the start of the COVID-19 pandemic. That October, producer Alex Saks approached director Katie Aselton saying she had secured about $500,000 of funding. In March 2021, it was announced Diane Keaton, Elizabeth Lail, Taylour Paige, Dustin Milligan, Simon Rex, Nicole Byer, Patti Harrison, Loretta Devine, Wendie Malick, Lois Smith and Amy Hill had joined the cast of the film, with a screenplay by Madeline Walter and Paul Welsh. Shortly after, it was reported that Elizabeth Lail joined to the cast.

Principal photography began on March 25, 2021, and concluded on April 23, 2021, in Los Angeles, California. Due to a limited production budget and the ongoing pandemic, several changes had to be made to the script during shooting, including the forced removal of a Coachella sequence due to the event's cancellation and combining days of shooting into one, as well as not being able to have chemistry tests between the actors prior to filming.

== Release ==
In April 2022, Gravitas Premiere acquired distribution rights to the film, and set it for an August 12, 2022, release. The red carpet took place at the NeueHouse in Los Angeles, California on August 10, 2022.

== Reception ==
=== Box office ===
The film made $310,000 from 1,930 theaters on its first day. It went on to debut to $1.1 million.

=== Critical response ===
On the review aggregator website Rotten Tomatoes, 23% of 64 critics' reviews are positive, with an average rating of 4.3/10. The website's consensus reads: "Diane Keaton gives Mack & Rita her all, but this cloying comedy lets her down at nearly every turn." Metacritic, which uses a weighted average, assigned the film a score of 49 out of 100, based on 13 critics, indicating "mixed or average" reviews. Audiences polled by CinemaScore gave the film an average grade of "D+" on an A+ to F scale, while PostTrak gave the film a 61% overall positive score, with 46% saying they would definitely recommend it.

Lisa Kennedy of The New York Times commended Aselton's "unexpected beats" as a director for capturing the "esprit de girlfriends" quality of Insecure, despite borrowing from Nancy Meyers' "rom-com catalog of upscale homes." Nell Minow, writing for RogerEbert.com, gave credit to Paige and Milligan's performances but wrote that "[T]he film's promising setup and excellent cast are let down by a script so forgettable that even to try to summarize it is to feel it dissolve from memory." Katie Walsh of the Los Angeles Times was also critical of the film's script, saying it "ditches character establishment and clear conflict for fish-out-of-water physical comedy and some vaguely affirmative lessons about learning to be yourself, unapologetically." The A.V. Club's Courtney Howard and Entertainment Weekly's Leah Greenblatt both gave the movie an overall C+ grade, the former saying it followed the same "whimsical fantasy boilerplate" of the body-swap subgenre with similar themes of "confidence, regret and friendship" and the latter calling it "a body-swap comedy so daffy and weightless it nearly levitates." Amy Nicholson of Variety called it "a bewildering generational culture-war comedy", criticizing the mixed messages on agism and the "underwritten" roles given to the supporting cast.

== See also ==
- Oh! Baby (2019 film), Tollywood film with similar premise
