= Shalita Grant =

American actress (born 1988)

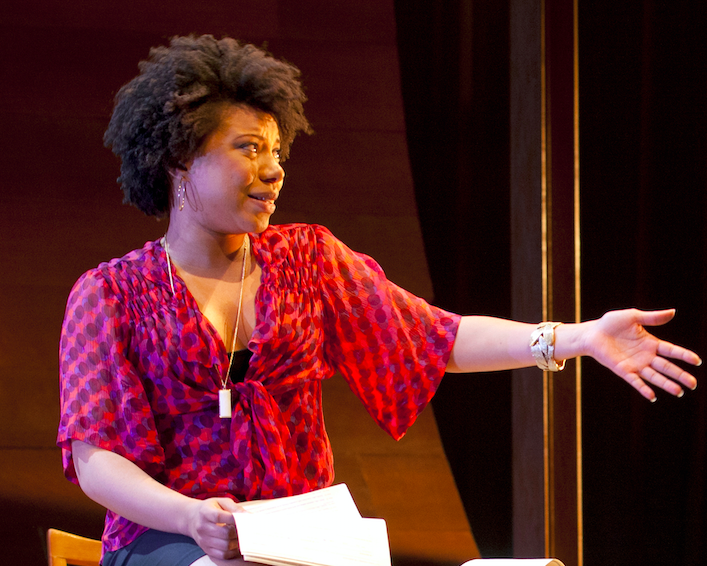
- Shalita Grant performing in 2012 with the Huntington Theatre Company
- Born: August 28, 1988 (age 38); Petersburg, Virginia, U.S.
- Education: Juilliard School (BFA)
- Occupation: Actress
- Years active: 2009–present
- Spouse: Sabrina Skau (m. 2018; div. 2020)
- Partner: Jessica Aguilar (2020–present)

Shalita Grant (born August 28, 1988) is an American actress best known for portraying NCIS Special Agent Sonja Percy on NCIS: New Orleans. She is also known from her roles on Mercy Street, You, Santa Clarita Diet, and Search Party.

== Early life and education ==
Grant was born in Petersburg, Virginia. She attended Appomattox Regional Governor's School For the Arts and Technology for a year before transferring to the Baltimore School for the Arts in Maryland, where she was a YoungArts Winner in Theater and Presidential Scholar in the Arts. At 17, she received a scholarship to attend the Juilliard School. In 2010, she graduated from Juilliard with a B.F.A. in drama.

== Career ==
=== Stage ===
Grant's earlier theater work includes The Public Theater's 2010 productions of Measure for Measure, The Winter's Tale, and The Merchant of Venice.

Grant originated the role of Cassandra in Christopher Durang's comedy Vanya and Sonia and Masha and Spike since the beginning of the show's development as a one-act play. She performed alongside Sigourney Weaver, David Hyde Pierce, Kristine Nielsen, Genevieve Angelson, and Billy Magnussen in the world-premiere at the McCarter Theatre Center in Princeton, NJ from September to October 2012 before moving to the Lincoln Center Theatre in an off-Broadway run October 2012 to January 2013. The show's success continued with a Broadway run and Grant's Broadway debut March through August 2013.

In 2012, she appeared in The Philanderer for the off-Broadway Pearl Theatre Company and the world-premiere of Kirsten Greenidge's play Luck of the Irish at the Huntington Theatre Company.

Grant was nominated for a Tony Award for Best Featured Actress in a Play in 2013 for her performance as Cassandra in the comedy Vanya and Sonia and Masha and Spike. The play won the Tony for Best Play as well as the Drama Desk Award for Outstanding Play. She also won the 2013 Theatre World Award for Outstanding Broadway Debut.

She returned to The Public Theater in 2017 for the Shakespeare in the Park production of A Midsummer Night's Dream.

=== Film ===
Her film credits include shorts Empire Corner (2010), Invisible (2010), and the Oscar-nominated short documentary, Rehearsing a Dream (2006).

=== Television ===
Following her Tony Award nomination, Grant moved to Los Angeles to pursue television where she fondly recalls her struggles in auditioning 54 times within one year for various roles and, at one point, while running out of savings, briefly turned to bartending before landing a series regular role on NCIS: New Orleans in 2015. After she departed NCIS: New Orleans in 2018, she was cast in the recurring role of FBI Agent Tess Rogers on the third season of the Netflix horror-comedy series Santa Clarita Diet. In 2020, Grant recurred on the third season of HBO Max's Search Party in the role of first-time, in over-her-head attorney Cassidy.

In October 2020, it was announced that Grant had been cast in the main role of Sherry Conrad on the third season of the Netflix thriller series You.

== Personal life ==
On August 8, 2018, Grant married commercial director Sabrina Skau in San Francisco, CA. They later divorced. Since 2020, she has been in a relationship with MMA fighter Jessica Aguilar.

== Awards and nominations ==
- 2013 - Tony Award, Best Featured Actress in a Play (Nomination), Vanya and Sonia and Masha and Spike
- 2013 - Theatre World Award, Outstanding Broadway Debut

== Filmography ==
Year	Title	Role	Notes
2011	The Good Wife	Sergeant Nora Swan	Episode: "Whiskey Tango Foxtrot"
2014–2015	Bones	Andie Roberts	Episode: "The Putter in the Rough" & "The Mutilation of the Master Manipulator"
2015–2018	NCIS: New Orleans	Sonja Percy	(Recurring, Season 1; Main, Seasons 2–4)
2015	Melissa & Joey	Evita Freeman	Episode: "Gone Girl" & "Parental Guidance"
2015	Battle Creek	Olivia	Episode: "Man's Best Friend"
2016	NCIS	Sonja Percy	Episode: "Sister City, Part I"
2016	Mercy Street	Aurelia Johnson	Main cast (Season 1)
2019	Santa Clarita Diet	Agent Tess Rogers	Recurring role (Season 3)
2020	Search Party	Cassidy Diamond	Recurring role (Season 3)
2021	Special	Rae	1 episode
2021	First Date	Jennifer	Short film
2021	Haunt the Johnsons	Ava Johnson	Podcast Series
2021; 2025	You	Sherry Conrad	Main cast (Season 3); Guest (Season 5)
2023	Abbott Elementary	Janet Elton	1 episode
2023	The Flash: Escape the Midnight Circus	Iris West	Podcast Series
2025	Common Side Effects	Female DEA Agent / Susan (voice)	2 episodes
2025	Side Quest	Janae	Episode: "Pull List"
