= Griffin Matthews =

American actor

- Born: 1981 or 1982 (age 43–44); Pittsburgh, Pennsylvania
- Education: Carnegie Mellon University
- Occupations: Actor, writer, director
- Spouse: Matt Gould (m. 2017)

Griffin Matthews (born 1981/82) is an American actor, writer, and director.

== Early life and education ==
Born in Pittsburgh, Pennsylvania, he graduated from Carnegie Mellon University with a B.F.A. in musical theater.

== Career ==
With husband Matt Gould, Matthews co-wrote the musical Witness Uganda, later retitled Invisible Thread, based on his experience volunteering in Uganda. The musical won the Richard Rodgers Awards for Musical Theatre in 2012 and 2014.

Matthews appears as fashion designer Luke Jacobson in the 2022 Disney+ series She-Hulk: Attorney at Law. His other television credits include Dear White People, The Flight Attendant, The Mentalist, Weeds, Torchwood, and Law & Order: LA.

Matthews, who is Black, has criticized institutionalized racism in American theater.

== Filmography ==
=== Television ===
Year	Title	Role	Notes	Ref.
2012	The Mentalist	Rafe	1 episode (Season 4, episode 13)	
2019	Dear White People	D'Unte	7 episodes	
2020–2022	The Flight Attendant	Shane Evans	Main role	
2022	She-Hulk: Attorney at Law	Luke Jacobson	2 episodes	
2024	Genius	Bayard Rustin	3 episodes (season 4)	
2025	You	Teddy Lockwood	Main role (season 5)	

== Personal life ==
In 2005, Matthews co-founded a volunteer organization called UgandaProject (formerly Be The Change Uganda). The organization supported the education of a group of teenagers living in Uganda.

Matthews is openly gay. He married composer and writer Matt Gould in 2017. They were introduced in 2009 by mutual friends due to their shared experience working in various parts of Africa (Gould served as a Peace Corps volunteer in the Islamic Republic of Mauritania from 2001-2003, and Matthews began volunteering in Uganda in 2005). The couple adopted two sons in August, 2022.
