= Dario Coates =

British actor (born 1992)

- Born: 25 April 1992 (age 34); Hebden Bridge, Yorkshire, England, United Kingdom
- Education: Italia Conti Academy of Theatre Arts
- Occupation: Actor
- Years active: 2007–present

Dario Coates (born 25 April 1992) is an English actor. He is known for portraying Alex Neeson in the television ITV soap Coronation Street (2007–2008).

== Biography ==
Coates attended Calder High School and Calderdale Theatre School. He acted in Calderdale Theatre School's production of the Philip Pullman novels His Dark Materials, for which he received acclaim from The Halifax Courier.

In 2016, he appeared in the BBC series The Coroner episode "The Beast of Lighthaven" as Ben Fairhead.

In 2023, he appeared as Connie in the fourth season of the Netflix series You.

== Filmography ==
=== Film ===
Year	Title	Role	Notes
2020	Boys on Film 20: Heaven Can Wait		

=== Television ===
Year	Title	Role	Notes
2007–2008	Coronation Street	Alex Neeson	32 episodes
2013	Drifters	LOL Squad 2	Episode: "Work Experience"
2014	Doctors	Leo Kellam	Episode: "The Inheritance"
2016	The Coroner	Ben Fairhead	Episode: "The Beast of Lighthaven"
2017	Endeavour	Lee 'Stix' Noble	Episode: "Canticle"
2017	Damned	Nick	Episode #2.5
2021	The Girlfriend Experience	Data Tagger	Episode: "State of Mind"
2021	Rules of the Game	DS Peter Alan	4 episodes
2022	Tell Me Everything	Pineapples	Episode #1.2
2023	You	Connie	Recurring role
2023	The Couple Next Door	Mike	2 episodes

=== Video games ===
Year	Title	Voice role	Notes
2020	Cyberpunk 2077	Voice	
2021	Red Solstice 2: Survivors	Additional voices	
2022	Expeditions: Rome	Tullius Cicero / Minucius Thermus / Felix Hadrianus	
2022	Total War: Warhammer III	Voice	
2022	Live A Live	Oersted / Odio, the Lord of Dark	English version
2023	The Lord of the Rings: Gollum	Orc / Elf	English version
2023	Killer Frequency	Murphy / Eugene Stine / Jimmy / Dudley / Officer Trout	
2023	Baldur's Gate 3	Astoundo the Lesser / Barcus Wroot / Bug Bludgeon / Various	
2023	Payday 3	Neon Cradle Bouncer / Radio Reporter / Civilians	
2023	Warhammer Age of Sigmar: Realms of Ruin	Awlrach the Drowner / Marshcrawla Sloggoth / Snargit	
2024	Banishers: Ghosts of New Eden	Gaufrey Rawlings / Sebastian Preese / Caleb Wattson	
2024	Closer the Distance	Laul	
2024	Metaphor: ReFantazio	Ovis Gideaux	English dub
2025	Split Fiction	Technician Harry / Parking Attendant / Additional Voices	
2025	Brawl Stars	Ziggy	
