= Natasha Behnam =

American actress

Natasha Beham
- Born: Orange County, California, United States
- Citizenship: American
- Education: Loyola Marymount University
- Occupations: Actress; Comedian
- Years active: 2016–present
- Television: The Girls on the Bus

Natasha Behnam is an American actress and comedian.

== Early life ==
Natasha Behnam grew-up in an Iranian-American household in Orange County, and has described wanting to be an actress by the time she was four years old. She attended Loyola Marymount University's Film & TV Production school where she took acting classes and performed improv & sketch comedy.

== Career ==
Behnam performed comedy with Upright Citizens Brigade and The Groundlings School. In 2018, she appeared in The CW's series Crazy Ex-Girlfriend season four, Animal Kingdom on TNT and also appeared in Mayans M.C. on FX. She played Michelle in the 2020 film American Pie Presents: Girls' Rules.

In 2024, Behnam appeared as journalist Lola Rahaii on HBO Max series The Girls on the Bus, based on Amy Chozick’s 2018 memoir Chasing Hillary. Her character was shaped into being a first-generation Persian after her casting and show-runner Rina Mimoum introduced her to the writer's room to share her experience being Iranian American. In a review for the LA Times, Mary McNamara described her performance by saying "she steals every scene she's in".

In May 2024, Behnam was cast as Dominique in a recurring role on the fifth series of Netflix thriller series You. She has an upcoming role in Barden and Sarah Start a Pandemic which premiered at Series Fest and won the Audience Award, she described the series as being about "two absurd best friends who will do anything to get out of work, so they decide they want to start another pandemic just so they don't have to go back to work".

== Personal life ==
Behnam speaks English and Persian. Her parents are from Tehran but fled from the Iranian Revolution. She describes herself as queer.

== Partial filmography ==
Key
†	Denotes works that have not yet been released

Year	Title	Role	Notes
2016	Get Spy	Melissa	1 episode
2016	Blake and Emily Get Famous	Blake	3 episodes
2018	Animal Kingdom	Taylor	1 episode
2018	Crazy Ex-Girlfriend	Courtney	Season 4
2020	American Pie Presents: Girls' Rules	Michelle	
2022	Mayans M.C.	Suze	2 episodes
2024	The Girls on the Bus	Lola	Main role
2025	You	Dominique	Recurring role
2025	C.O.G.	Liza	previously titled as CognAItive
TBA	Barden and Sarah Start a Pandemic†	Sarah	Post-production
