= Tati Gabrielle =

American actress (born 1996)

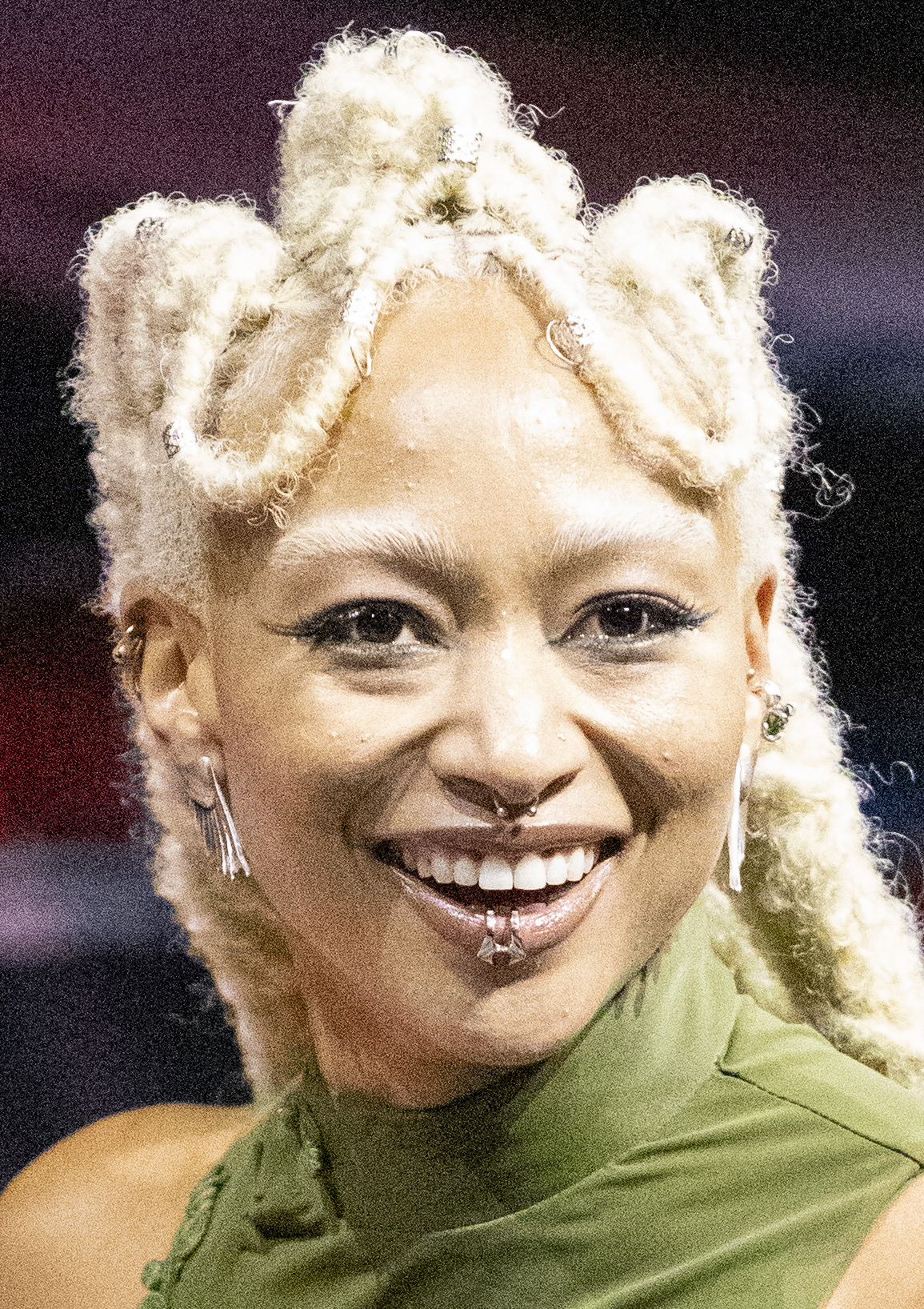
- Gabrielle in 2025
- Born: Tatiana Gabrielle Hobson; January 25, 1996 (age 30); San Francisco, California, U.S.
- Education: Spelman College
- Occupation: Actress
- Years active: 2014–present

Tatiana Gabrielle Hobson (born January 25, 1996), known professionally as Tati Gabrielle, is an American actress. She is known for her roles as Gaia on The CW science fiction television series The 100 (2017–2020), Prudence on the Netflix original series Chilling Adventures of Sabrina (2018–2020), Marienne Bellamy on the Netflix series You (2021–2025), and Nora in the HBO post-apocalyptic drama series The Last of Us (2025–present). She also provided the voice of Willow Park on the Disney Channel animated series The Owl House (2020–2023), and played Jo Braddock in the 2022 film Uncharted, Hannah Kim on the Netflix series Kaleidoscope (2023), and the bō-wielding assassin Jade in the 2026 martial arts dark fantasy film Mortal Kombat II.

== Early life and education ==
Tatiana Gabrielle was born on January 25, 1996, in San Francisco, California. She is one of three children born to Traci (née Hewitt) and Terry Hobson. Her father is African American, and her mother was born in Korea to a Korean woman and African American soldier. At age four, her mother was adopted by an African American military family that was stationed in Japan at the time.

Gabrielle began acting in the third grade, in an adaptation of Lemony Snicket's A Series of Unfortunate Events, where she played the main role of Lemony Snicket. She auditioned for Oakland School for the Arts in middle school and was accepted into their theatre program. She has performed in and directed several productions and has won multiple awards for her work at various theatre festivals, including the Edinburgh Festival Fringe in Scotland.

Gabrielle graduated from Oakland School for the Arts with a 3.7 GPA. She moved to Atlanta after high school to attend Spelman College, where she majored in drama and French.

== Career ==
Gabrielle's first credit was under the name Tatiana Hobson, in the 2014 short film To Stay the Sword. In 2015, Gabrielle moved to Los Angeles. She starred in the 2015 short film Tatterdemalion and the 2016 television film Just Jenna as Monique.

Her first credit as Tati Gabrielle came in 2016 for her guest role as Wacky Jacky in the "Tightrope of Doom" episode of the Disney Channel comedy series K.C. Undercover. Later that year, Gabrielle also starred in Nickelodeon's The Thundermans in the episode "Stealing Home" as Hacksaw.

In 2017, Gabrielle landed her first recurring role as Gaia in The CW apocalyptic drama The 100. That same year, she was featured in an episode titled "Bob" of the Hulu anthology series Dimension 404, where she portrayed Amanda's sister. Gabrielle also voiced Addie in the 2017 film The Emoji Movie, her first major film role, and recurred in the second season of Hulu's Freakish as Birdie and on the TBS animated series Tarantula.

In March 2018, Gabrielle was cast as a series regular in the role of Prudence in the Netflix original series, Chilling Adventures of Sabrina. In 2020, Gabrielle was cast as Marienne Bellamy on the third season of the Netflix psychological thriller series You, and reprised her role on the fourth and fifth seasons. In 2022, Gabrielle starred as the villain Jo Braddock in the film Uncharted. In May 2023, Gabrielle was cast as Jade in Mortal Kombat II. In a 2026 interview, Gabrielle said that Jade was her favourite character in the video games when growing up, and was open to reprising her role in possible future sequels. In March 2024, Gabrielle was cast as Nora in the second season of the HBO post-apocalyptic drama series The Last of Us. She was promoted to a series regular for the third season in March 2026.

In 2024, it was announced that she will portray Jordan A. Mun in the upcoming video game Intergalactic: The Heretic Prophet, developed by Naughty Dog.

== Filmography ==
=== Film ===
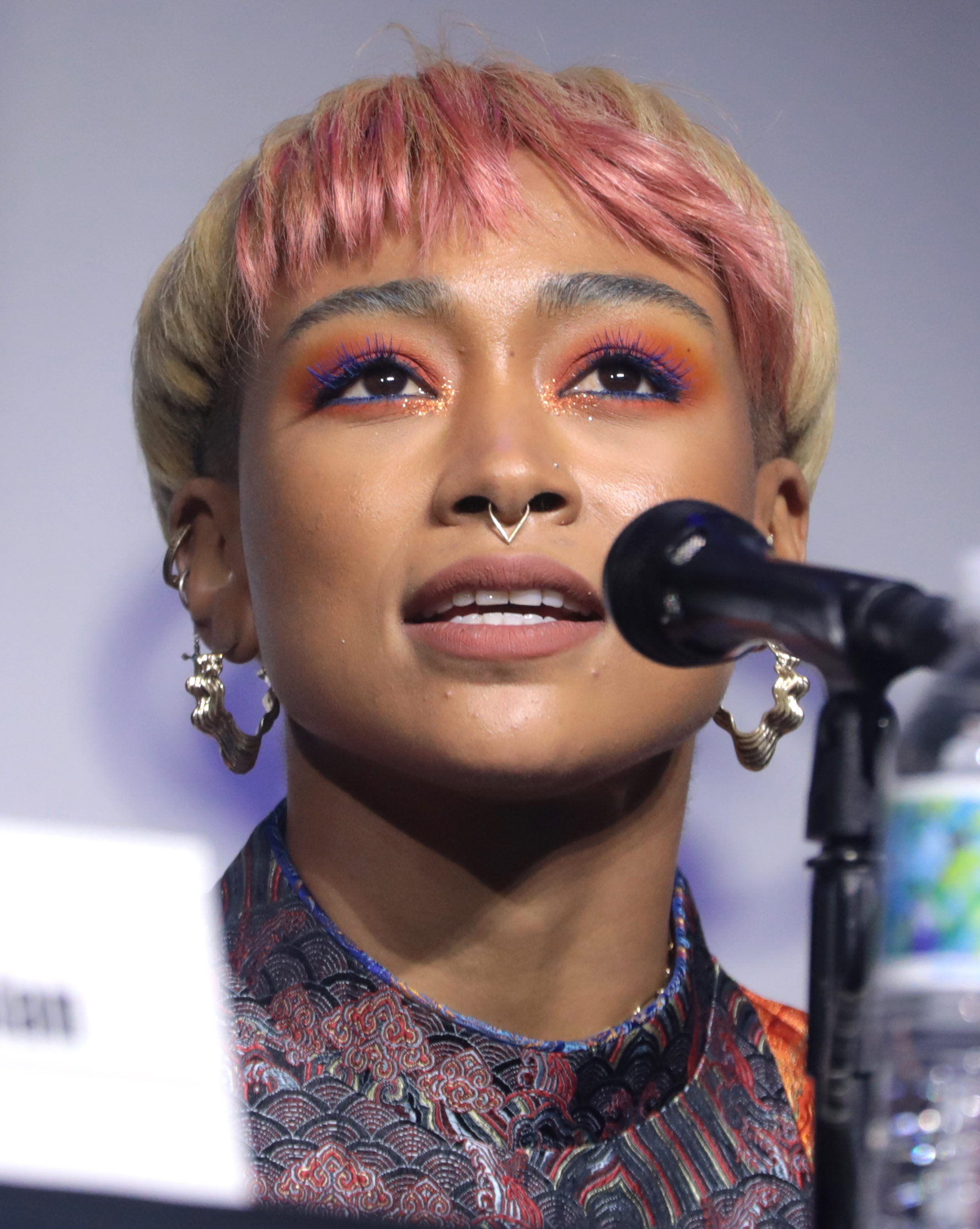
Gabrielle in 2023

Key
†	Denotes films that have not yet been released

Year	Title	Role	Notes
2014	To Stay the Sword	Keating	Short film; credited as Tatiana Hobson
2015	Tatterdemalion		Short film; credited as Tatiana Hobson
2017	The Emoji Movie	Addie (voice)	
2022	Uncharted	Jo Braddock	
2023	Batman: The Doom That Came to Gotham	Kai Li Cain (voice)	Direct-to-video
2024	The Supremes at Earl's All-You-Can-Eat	Young Barbara Jean Mayberry	
2026	Mortal Kombat II	Jade	
2026	How to Rob a Bank	Skyler	
2026	Quarter †	Elle	Post-production

=== Television ===
Year	Title	Role	Notes
2016	Just Jenna	Monique	Television film; credited as Tatiana Hobson
2016	K.C. Undercover	Wackie Jackie	Episode: "Tightrope of Doom"
2016	The Thundermans	Hacksaw	Episode: "Stealing Home"
2017–2020	The 100	Gaia	Recurring role; 29 episodes (seasons 4–7)
2017	Dimension 404	Amanda's sister	Episode: "Bob"
2017	Freakish	Birdie	4 episodes
2017	Tarantula	(voice)	4 episodes
2018–2020	Chilling Adventures of Sabrina	Prudence Blackwood	Main cast
2020–2023	The Owl House	Willow Park (voice)	Recurring role (season 1); main role (season 2–3)
2021–2025	You	Marienne Bellamy	Main role (season 3–4), special guest star (season 5)
2023	Kaleidoscope	Hannah Kim	Main role
2025	Phineas and Ferb	Sophia Sharkboard (voice)	Episode: "Space Adventure"
2025–present	The Last of Us	Nora	Recurring role (season 2); main role (season 3)
2026	Bass X Machina	Dana Starr (voice)	Main role

=== Video games ===
Year	Title	Role
TBA	Intergalactic: The Heretic Prophet	Jordan A. Mun
