= You season 3 =

Season of television series

You
- Season 3
- Promotional poster
- Showrunner: Sera Gamble
- Starring: Penn Badgley; Victoria Pedretti; Saffron Burrows; Tati Gabrielle; Shalita Grant; Travis Van Winkle; Dylan Arnold
- No. of episodes: 10

Release
- Original network: Netflix
- Original release: October 15, 2021

Season chronology
- ← Previous; Season 2 Next → Season 4

The third season of the American psychological thriller television series You was ordered by Netflix on January 14, 2020. It features the continuation of Joe Goldberg's fraught relationship with Love Quinn, who is pregnant with his child in a new suburban home. You series creators Greg Berlanti and Sera Gamble return as co-executive producers, and Gamble returns as showrunner. Penn Badgley, Victoria Pedretti, and Saffron Burrows, who was upgraded to a series regular, reprise their roles. New cast members include Shalita Grant, Travis Van Winkle, Dylan Arnold, and Tati Gabrielle. Michaela McManus portrays Joe's new neighbor, shown at end of the second season. In December 2020, the production of the third season was suspended for two months due to the COVID-19 pandemic and resumed in February 2021. The ten-episode season premiered on October 15, 2021.

== Synopsis ==
In the third season, Joe and Love are married and raising their newborn son, Henry, in the fictitious Californian suburb of Madre Linda. As their relationship dynamic takes a new turn, Joe continues to repeat the cycle of obsession with a burgeoning interest in Natalie Engler, the next door neighbor. This time, Love flips the script to ensure that her dream of having the perfect family will not be torn away so easily by Joe's compulsive actions. However, after Love kills Natalie, Joe turns his obsession to Marienne, a librarian who shares a troubled childhood in the foster system. Further complicating Love and Joe's relationship, Natalie's stepson Theo falls head over heels for Love.

== Cast ==
=== Main ===
- Penn Badgley as Joe Goldberg, a serial killer who moves into a relatively quaint suburb with his wife, Love
- Victoria Pedretti as Love Quinn, a serial killer and Joe's wife, the only remaining heir of the Quinn family
- Saffron Burrows as Dottie Quinn, Love's mother
- Tati Gabrielle as Marienne Bellamy, a no-nonsense librarian who struggles with personal problems while trying to create a better future for herself and her young child, Juliette
- Shalita Grant as Sherry Conrad, a locally famous "momfluencer", admired by her social media followers for her well crafted persona
- Travis Van Winkle as Cary Conrad, a wealthy, charismatic, and self-proclaimed founder who runs his own supplement company
- Dylan Arnold as Theo Engler, a college student with a strained relationship with his stepfather, Matthew Engler, and who suffers from addiction issues

=== Recurring ===
- Scott Speedman as Matthew Engler, Joe's next-door neighbor, an affluent CEO, husband and withdrawn stepfather who is reserved and at times mysterious
- Shannon Chan-Kent as Kiki, a loyal member of Sherry Conrad's clique and a prominent life coach
- Christopher Sean as Brandon, Kiki's husband who formerly worked as a tech investor and is now a stay-at-home father for their kids
- Ben Mehl as Dante Ferguson, a blind former war veteran now working as a librarian who tries to dedicate his time to his partner and two stepchildren
- Christopher O'Shea as Andrew Tucker, a fit stay-at-home dad and a close friend within Sherry Conrad's inner circle
- Bryan Safi as Jackson Newhall, Andrew Tucker's sardonic husband, a renowned tech attorney
- Mackenzie Astin as Gil Brigham, a friendly and vaccine-skeptical geology professor
- Terryn Westbrook as Margaret Brigham, Gil's wife
- Ayelet Zurer as Dr. Chandra, an extremely curt but experienced couple's therapist who takes on Joe and Love as clients
- Jack Fisher as young Joe
- Marcia Cross as Jean, Matthew Engler's corporate lawyer
- Mauricio Lara as Paulie, a close friend of Joe in his formative years
- Kim Shaw as Nurse Fiona, a school nurse who helped protect a young Joe at his group home, but was living with an abusive boyfriend
- Scott Michael Foster as Ryan Goodwin, a local television reporter and well-respected single father who overcame addiction but conceals his own dark secrets from others
- Romy Rosemont as Ruthie Falco, a detective

=== Guest ===
- Michaela McManus as Natalie Engler, Matthew Engler's second wife who harbors a secret life and who becomes Joe's new subject of obsession
- James Scully as Forty Quinn, Love's deceased twin brother
- Magda Apanowicz as Sandy Goldberg, Joe's mother

== Episodes ==
No. overall	No. in season	Title	Directed by	Written by	Original release date
21	1	"And They Lived Happily Ever After"	Silver Tree	Sera Gamble & Mairin Reed	October 15, 2021
Love and Joe find themselves overwhelmed with their newborn son Henry, which strains their relationship. Meanwhile, Joe struggles to bond with Henry and becomes infatuated with their next-door neighbor Natalie Engler, a real estate agent and the wife of wealthy tech mogul Matthew Engler. Love tries to fit in with Madre Linda's social circle by befriending Sherry Conrad, a local Instagram influencer. Natalie notices Joe's interest in her and invites him for a wine night. They kiss but Joe has second thoughts and returns home to have sex with Love for the first time in months. The following night, they attend a party hosted by Sherry where Love overhears her gossiping about her family and the death of her brother Forty. Following a brief conversation with Natalie, Love accuses Joe of being obsessed with her, which he denies. Later, Natalie shows Love a vacant store to open a bakery; Love murders her in the property basement after discovering Joe's box of paraphernalia he stole from Natalie.
22	2	"So I Married an Axe Murderer"	Silver Tree	Neil Reynolds & Kelli Breslin	October 15, 2021
Joe and Love attend couple's therapy to address their struggling marriage. Meanwhile, they develop a strategy to dispose of Natalie's body at a nearby forest and create a convincing alibi for her disappearance. Love meets Theo, a college student, on a chance encounter at the supermarket, while Joe befriends Marienne, Madre Linda's librarian, who allows him to restore rare books to sell for money toward Ellie. Upon discovering at the Conrads' children's birthday that Madre Linda's residents all wear a biosensor developed by Matthew on their rings, Joe and Love exhume Natalie's body, remove her wedding ring, and bury her beneath the foundation of a construction site. The two then reconcile and make a vow to no longer commit murder. Love opens her bakery called "A Fresh Tart" – beneath which she and Joe build a new plexiglass cage – and discovers Theo is Matthew's stepson.
23	3	"Missing White Woman Syndrome"	John Scott	Kara Lee Corthron & Justin W. Lo	October 15, 2021
As Natalie's disappearance attracts media attention, Joe and Love decide to frame Matthew for her murder by planting Natalie's bloodstained scarf in his home. Henry contracts measles and is rushed to the hospital. While breaking into the Engler home, Joe discovers he too has measles and collapses; Matthew nurses him to health, and Joe suggests he make a statement to the press to clear his name, which Matthew does during a vigil for Natalie. Theo begins flirting with Love, who refuses his advances, though the two later bond at the hospital over Theo's strained relationship with his stepfather. Dottie reveals she and Love's father are divorcing, putting the family's finances in flux. As Henry recovers, Joe and Love decide not to frame Matthew and burn the scarf. The police recover Natalie's wedding ring. The next day, Gil, a neighbor, reveals to Love at her bakery that his daughters, whom he refused to vaccinate, gave Henry measles. An enraged Love bludgeons him unconscious as he leaves.
24	4	"Hands Across Madre Linda"	John Scott	Hillary Benefiel & Michael Foley	October 15, 2021
Joe and Love lock Gil in the plexiglass vault in the bakery's basement. Realizing they cannot release Gil without assurances that he will not report the assault, Joe and Love search for incriminating information they can use as leverage for Gil's silence. Love discovers through her family's private investigator that Gil's son is a sexual predator whom they link to a recent assault case on a college campus. Gil, disgusted to learn that his son has continued his abusive behavior, hangs himself inside the cage. Joe and Love decide to frame Gil for Natalie's death: Love plants the murder weapon with Gil's fingerprints in the forest where Sherry has organized a community search for Natalie, while Joe moves Gil's body to his residence and fabricates a suicide note from Gil declaring that he killed himself out of guilt over murdering Natalie. The ruse works and six months pass by in relative peace. Theo kisses Love after a heartfelt conversation, while Joe starts to become obsessed with Marienne.
25	5	"Into the Woods"	Silver Tree	Mairin Reed & Amanda Johnson-Zetterström	October 15, 2021
Joe and Love's therapist suggests that Joe should make new friends, so he agrees to go on a hunting retreat with Cary – Sherry's husband and a self-improvement guru – and his friends. Joe discovers that Love has been paying for Theo's Uber trips and confronts her. Love says that Theo has nobody to look after him and confesses that Theo kissed her at the bakery. During the retreat, Cary takes Joe on a night hunt provokes him into fighting him; Joe pushes Cary over a cliff, knocking him out. Joe carries an unconscious Cary back to the camp, where he awakens and declares that he has helped Joe find his inner strength. Joe cries cathartically and embraces his newfound friends. Theo calls Love from the police station after getting detained for driving an electric scooter while inebriated. The two ride the scooter together and later have sex. Dottie realizes what Love has done after she gets home, and Love decides to cut ties with Theo. Joe sets off the bakery's alarm to give himself an alibi to leave the house and stalk Marienne.
26	6	"W.O.M.B."	Silver Tree	Kelli Breslin & Kara Lee Corthron	October 15, 2021
Joe begins probing into Marienne's private life and discovers she is a recovering addict in the middle of a bitter custody battle with her ex-husband Ryan Goodwin, a local news reporter. He later intervenes in an argument between Ryan and Marienne at the library, but Marienne chastises him. The library's sprinkler system suddenly malfunctions, and as Joe spends the night helping Marienne salvage books, she opens up about her personal struggles and they kiss. Love, still reeling from Forty's death, believes she may be pregnant with Theo's child, but later begins menstruating. She gets drunk after an argument with her mother and hallucinates Forty's presence, which helps her grieve him. Theo discovers that Matthew has been illegally spying on Madre Linda's residents in an attempt to find Natalie's real killer, and warns Love. Joe and Love agree that the latter should keep Theo around as a source of information on Matthew's investigation.
27	7	"We're All Mad Here"	Pete Chatmon	Justin W. Lo & Amanda Johnson-Zetterström	October 15, 2021
Marienne decides not to pursue her feelings for Joe out of morality. Matthew enlists an expert programmer from his company to help him hack into Madre Linda's security feeds. Love unsuccessfully initiates foreplay with Joe – who is now solely interested in Marienne – and later has sex with Theo again. Sherry enlists Love to help cater for the library's fundraiser event. Joe plots to take down Ryan by engineering his relapse, but the plan fails, as Joe learns that Ryan is a regular drug taker, and what Joe snuck into his power shake didn't make a difference. Ryan confronts Joe at the fundraiser and tells him he is aware that Joe has been following him. Love meets Marienne at the event; Sherry later approaches Love and tells her that she and Cary want to try swinging with Love and Joe. Dottie, devastated after losing both Anavrin and her vineyard to her ex-husband in her divorce settlement, kidnaps Henry and burns down the vineyard. She is sentenced to a stay in rehab, and Love cuts ties with her. Dottie confides to Joe that Love may have murdered her first husband, James.
28	8	"Swing and a Miss"	Pete Chatmon	AB Chao & Dylan Cohen	October 15, 2021
Joe goes along with Love's interest in swinging with the Conrads, hoping it will expose their marriage as broken and enable him to pursue a relationship with Marienne. At Marienne's request, Joe testifies at her custody hearing for her and Ryan's daughter, but Marienne later calls Joe and tearfully reveals Ryan publicized sexually explicit photos she had sent him in an attempt to sabotage her case. Joe learns Ryan is friends with the judge in the case. Theo breaks into Matthew's office and discovers his database of Madre Linda's security feeds; Matthew catches him and tells him he suspects Love in Natalie's disappearance. While having sex with the Conrads, Love notices Joe fantasizing about someone else and confronts him in private, loudly reminding him that she killed Natalie out of commitment to her marriage to Joe. The Conrads, who overheard the argument, attempt to flee the house, but Joe and Love subdue them and lock them in the glass cage. The two have sex afterwards, realizing that they are aroused by violence.
29	9	"Red Flag"	Sasha Alexander	Michael Foley & Hillary Benefiel	October 15, 2021
Joe finds Cary's gun while cleaning up the house. He later finds a dejected Marienne outside a liquor store, where she tells him Ryan is taking their daughter to New Jersey. Joe encourages her not to give up on her daughter. Marienne invites him to her home where the two have sex. Ryan later discovers Joe stalking him, leading to a struggle that ends with Joe stabbing Ryan to death. In an attempt to free herself and Cary from the cage, Sherry suggests to Love that she expose Matthew's illegal surveillance on Sherry's lifestyle blog. Love gives them Cary's gun and offers to set one of them free if one kills the other, hoping to stage a murder-suicide. Theo offers to obtain a copy of Matthew's surveillance footage, believing Love to be a victim of Joe's domestic abuse based on a video feed of the two of them arguing. Matthew's legal team demands that he delete his footage; Matthew complies, but not before Theo recovers a backup of the data. Theo analyzes the footage and discovers Joe leaving the bakery with Natalie's car. He goes to the bakery to tell Love but finds the Conrads imprisoned in the cage. While leaving, he encounters Love, who bludgeons him with a fire extinguisher.
30	10	"What Is Love?"	Silver Tree	Sera Gamble & Neil Reynolds	October 15, 2021
Love admits to Joe that she attacked Theo and left him in the basement, and suggests the two have another baby. Joe discovers Theo is alive and takes him to the hospital. Love finds Joe's discarded shirt stained with Ryan's blood and realizes Joe is obsessed with Marienne. She confronts him at dinner, where Joe asks for a divorce. Love paralyzes Joe with aconite (with which she confesses to have accidentally killed James) and calls Marienne to the house, planning to kill her. While Love is away to deliver an order, Matthew discovers a paralyzed Joe, who reveals Theo's location to him. Love returns and reveals to a horrified Marienne that Joe killed Ryan, but relents from killing her when Marienne's daughter interrupts. After Marienne leaves, Love prepares to kill Joe, but he injects her with a lethal dose of aconite, having known about the poison and taken an antidote beforehand. Joe stages a murder-suicide, writing a note framing Love for all the Madre Linda murders and setting the house on fire. The Conrads find Love's spare key inside the cage and free themselves, strengthening their marriage in the process. Matthew and Theo grow closer over the latter's recovery. Joe leaves Henry in the care of Dante, his coworker at the library. He then adopts a new identity and escapes to Paris in search of Marienne.

== Production ==
=== Development ===
Netflix confirmed that You was renewed for a 10-episode third season on January 14, 2020, approximately three weeks after the second season was released. Prior to the official announcement, lead actor Penn Badgley accidentally let slip that there would be a third season during an Entertainment Tonight interview. Production on the third season began in February 2020 but was later suspended due to the COVID-19 pandemic. Production resumed in November 2020. Sera Gamble returned as showrunner and served as co-executive producer with series co-creator Greg Berlanti.

The first two seasons were loosely based on the books You and Hidden Bodies by Caroline Kepnes. A third book written by Kepnes was published on April 6, 2021, but it is unclear the extent to which that novel's plot will inform You's third season. When asked a question about the season following the plot of the third book in an interview with FilmInk, Gamble answered that "You'll be able to see the parallels when you read the book. But over the course of season two, Joe and Love went in a few directions different than Caroline's books. The longer a TV show exists alongside a book or a book series, the more it sort of diverges."

=== Filming ===
For the third season, the series was awarded $7.2 million in tax credits by the state of California. Filming for the third season began on November 2, 2020, and was originally scheduled to conclude in April 2021. On December 31, 2020, production for the third season was suspended for two weeks due to a surge in the COVID-19 pandemic. Filming resumed in February 2021 and ended in April 2021.

=== Casting ===
Penn Badgley, Victoria Pedretti and Saffron Burrows reprise their roles as Joe Goldberg, Love Quinn, and Dottie Quinn respectively, with Burrows being upgraded to series regular after appearing in a recurring role in the second season. In October 2020, Travis Van Winkle and Shalita Grant were cast as series regulars and Scott Speedman was cast in a recurring role. On November 18, 2020, Dylan Arnold and Tati Gabrielle were announced as new series regular cast members, as well as recurring guests Michaela McManus, Shannon Chan-Kent, Ben Mehl, Christopher O'Shea, Christopher Sean, Bryan Safi, Mackenzie Astin, Ayelet Zurer, Jack Fisher, and Mauricio Lara – with McManus playing Joe's neighbor, shown briefly at the end of the second season. On January 25, 2021, Scott Michael Foster joined the cast in a recurring role for the third season. On April 15, 2021, it was confirmed that John Stamos would not be returning in the third season as Dr. Nicky.

== Release ==
As part of a video and letter to its shareholders in April 2021, Netflix's co-chief executive officer and chief content officer, Ted Sarandos confirmed that the third season of You would premiere sometime in the fourth quarter of 2021. On August 30, 2021, Netflix announced that the third season would premiere on October 15, 2021. A teaser trailer was released that day that revealed the name of Love and Joe's baby, Henry. On September 17, 2021, the official trailer for the third season was released.

== Reception ==
The third season received critical acclaim, with some reviewers naming it the series' best to date. On the review aggregator website Rotten Tomatoes, the season holds a 96% approval rating with an average rating of 8.00/10 based on 53 reviews. The website's critics consensus reads, "You takes its thrilling saga to the suburbs with superb results, made all the more delicious by Penn Badgley and Victoria Pedretti's committed performances." On Metacritic, the third season has a weighted average score of 77 out of 100, based on 13 critics, indicating "generally favorable" reviews.

In a positive review of the third season, Clémence Michallon from The Independent wrote that, "With such an established fanbase, You could be resting on its laurels by now, endlessly recycling its initial premise without recreating the excitement of the beginning. Kudos, then, to the writers who have succeeded, exquisitely so, in taking it to new heights." Cass Clarke from Comic Book Resources recommended the third season in her review by highlighting that, "Season 3 does a fine job at showcasing the vapidness of a Silicon Valley-like suburb, where neighbors are mostly concerned with intermittent fasting, drugs and updating their Instagram stories on the hour every hour", further praising the narrative, by adding that "You's writing is at its best when Love is given a chance to outsmart Joe, as opposed to being just more fodder for him to play with and destroy. Without spoiling the bloody mayhem to come, the You Season 3 finale showcases Pedretti's most captivating performance to date."

Brian Lowry from CNN praised the third season, stating that it is "continues the greatness of the first season and delivers a satisfying, bloody good time". Kayla Cobb of Decider gave the third season a very positive review, writing: "You season 3 is a marital therapy session wrapped in murder, lies, and even more glass cages. Stick with it, and you will be rewarded beyond your wildest, blood-soaked dreams." She said further that, "The acting is stronger than ever, now that Badgley's Joe has a worthy opponent, and you won't be able to see the season's big twists coming. No matter why you initially enjoyed You, you're going to fall in love with this new season, and Love Quinn."
