= You season 2 =

You
- Season 2
- Promotional poster
- Showrunner: Sera Gamble
- Starring: Penn Badgley; Victoria Pedretti; Jenna Ortega; James Scully; Ambyr Childers; Carmela Zumbado
- No. of episodes: 10

Release
- Original network: Netflix
- Original release: December 26, 2019

Season chronology
- ← Previous; Season 1 Next → Season 3

The second season of the American psychological thriller television series You was ordered by Lifetime on July 26, 2018. On December 3, 2018, it was announced that the network had passed on the second season and that the series would move to Netflix as a Netflix Original series. Penn Badgley and Ambyr Childers reprise their roles while new cast members include Victoria Pedretti, James Scully, Jenna Ortega, and Carmela Zumbado. The 10-episode second season is loosely based on the novel Hidden Bodies by Caroline Kepnes and was released in its entirety on Netflix on December 26, 2019.

== Synopsis ==
In the second season, Joe Goldberg moves from New York to Los Angeles to escape his past, and starts over with a new identity. He meets a series of people, including his neighbors Delilah and Ellie Alves, and Forty Quinn. When he meets avid chef Love Quinn, twin sister of Forty, Joe begins falling into his old patterns of obsession and violence. As Joe attempts to forge a new love, he strives to make his relationship with Love succeed at all costs, to avoid the fate of his past romantic endeavors.

== Cast and characters ==
=== Main ===
- Penn Badgley as Joe Goldberg, a serial killer and bookstore clerk at Anavrin, now using the pseudonym Will Bettelheim for a new identity
- Victoria Pedretti as Love Quinn, an aspiring chef and health guru in Los Angeles
- Jenna Ortega as Ellie Alves, Joe's savvy 15-year-old neighbor
- James Scully as Forty Quinn, Love's troubled twin brother
- Ambyr Childers as Candace Stone, Joe's ex-girlfriend and a fledgling musician posing as an indie film producer
- Carmela Zumbado as Delilah Alves, an investigative reporter and Ellie's older sister

=== Recurring ===
- Adwin Brown as Calvin, a manager at Anavrin, a trendy high-end grocery store
- Robin Lord Taylor as Will Bettelheim, a hacker whose identity Joe briefly assumes
- Marielle Scott as Lucy Sprecher, an edgy-chic talent agent and Sunrise's partner
- Chris D'Elia as Joshua "Henderson" Bunter, a famous stand-up comedian in Los Angeles
- Charlie Barnett as Gabe Miranda, a successful acupuncturist and Love's oldest friend and closest confidant
- Melanie Field as Sunrise Darshan Cummings, Lucy's partner and a stay-at-home lifestyle blogger
- Aidan Wallace as Little Joe Goldberg
- Magda Apanowicz as Sandy Goldberg, Joe's biological mother
- Danny Vasquez as David Fincher, a LAPD officer
- Saffron Burrows as Dottie Quinn, Love and Forty's mother

=== Guest ===
- Elizabeth Lail as Guinevere Beck, Joe's deceased ex-girlfriend and former obsessive interest
- Steven W. Bailey as Jasper Krenn, a criminal to whom Will owes money
- Kathy Griffin as Mary, comedienne friend of Henderson
- Michael Reilly Burke as Ray Quinn, Love and Forty's father
- John Stamos as Dr. Nicky, Joe's ex-therapist whom he framed for Beck's murder in the previous season
- Billy Lush as Raphael Passero, Joe's biological father
- David Paladino as Alec Grigoryan, a private investigator hired by Love to investigate Candace
- Haven Everly as Gigi, Will's fiancée
- Andrew Creer as Milo Warrington, James' best friend and Love's new boyfriend after her breakup with Joe
- Daniel Durant as James Kennedy, Love's deaf husband who died of cancer
- Madeline Zima as Rachel, Candace/Amy's roommate who knows Krav Maga
- Brooke Johnson as Sofia, Forty's au pair lover

== Episodes ==
No. overall	No. in season	Title	Directed by	Written by	Original release date
11	1	"A Fresh Start"	Kevin Rodney Sullivan	Sera Gamble	December 26, 2019
After an intense encounter with Candace during which she vows to make him suffer, Joe flees New York for Los Angeles. Using the name Will, he secures an apartment and gets a job in the book cafe of a trendy family-owned grocery store, Anavrin. There he meets Love Quinn, a local woman who works in the kitchen. A nervous Joe resists her advances while befriending Ellie Alves, his 15-year-old neighbor. After Ellie coaches Joe to create an authentic social media presence, Love takes him on a food tour of the city to get to know him, and he finds himself very attracted. A mysterious visitor to his apartment prompts Joe to visit the real Will, whom he has locked inside a plexiglass vault in a rented storage unit. Joe recalls how seeing and then stalking Love led him to find an apartment near hers and get a job where she works.
12	2	"Just the Tip"	Silver Tree	Michael Foley	December 26, 2019
Joe recalls his arrival in LA, and meeting with Will, a man who sells clean identities. Joe knocks out Will, locks him in the vault and assumes his identity. In the present, Love kisses Joe, and he starts imagining Beck nearby whenever he is with Love. Will's visitor, Jasper, cuts off the last joint of Joe's pinky finger when he does not have the $50,000 Will owes him. Joe spies on a lunch between Love and her three friends: Lucy, a Hollywood agent; Sunrise, Lucy's girlfriend; and Gabe, Love's pansexual best friend. Love catches Joe in a lie and is upset, but they later mend fences and agree to be friends, as Joe is genuinely afraid he will hurt her. Joe lures Jasper to the storage unit and kills him, and a guilty Joe apologizes to his vision of Beck. After having his finger joint reattached, Joe dismembers Jasper's body in the Anavrin kitchen and puts him through the meat grinder. Ellie's older sister Delilah, a reporter, tells Joe that she was drugged and raped at age 17 by the well-known comedian Henderson.
13	3	"What Are Friends For?"	John Scott	Neil Reynolds	December 26, 2019
While Joe struggles to resist his attraction to Love, he befriends her self-absorbed twin Forty, an aspiring writer/director/producer who plays at managing Anavrin. Joe's attempt to reconnect with an icy Love backfires, and she argues with Forty about his career aspirations. Joe catches Ellie hanging around with Henderson, and vows to protect her from the predator, having already surreptitiously installed spyware on her phone. Looking for dirt on Henderson, Joe bluffs his way into the comedian's house party. Forty tags along to pitch a project to Henderson, but has a drug-fueled meltdown. Joe sees kindness in Henderson before he takes Forty home with him and summons Love. Joe has sex with Love, and sees another side of her. After getting Will back on his meds, Joe has him search Henderson's stolen laptop, but he finds nothing. Forty tells Joe about a kinky secret room Henderson has in his house.
14	4	"The Good, the Bad, & the Hendy"	DeMane Davis	Justin W. Lo	December 26, 2019
Joe's blossoming relationship with Love is challenged by Forty's neediness, but Joe at least manages to win over Love's friends. From the vault, Will helps Joe break into Henderson's house. In the secret room, he finds Polaroid photos of unconscious women, including Delilah. He takes them with him and then leaves them at Delilah's doorstep for her to find so she can expose Henderson. Joe learns that Ellie has discovered and disabled his spyware, and is going over to Henderson's place. From the other room, Joe watches Henderson drug Ellie's drink, so he doses Henderson as well. Joe tries to elicit a confession, but accidentally knocks Henderson down the stairs and kills him. As promised, Joe releases Will, with Will's assurance that he will stay quiet about his ordeal and disappear. While Love and Forty are out of town at a film festival, Forty meets an attractive woman calling herself Amy, who is actually Candace.
15	5	"Have a Good Wellkend, Joe!"	Cherie Nowlan	Amanda Johnson-Zetterström	December 26, 2019
Falling in love with Love, Joe accompanies her to a wellness retreat organized by her parents for their anniversary. Forty arrives with Candace, who found Joe after randomly seeing an online video of Forty's meltdown at Henderson's. Candace recalls attempting to leave Joe, but then finding herself his prisoner. Thinking he accidentally killed her, he buries her in a shallow grave, but she later awakens and crawls out. Candace's presence puts Joe on edge, which is not helped by Love's dysfunctional family dynamic. After Forty implodes and Love has a confrontation with her mother, Love tells Joe about Forty's childhood abuse. Joe tells Love that he loves her. Candace puts Joe on notice, and he soon learns that Candace has convinced Forty to adapt Beck's book into a screenplay. Though initially determined to be a suicide, the police now believe that Henderson's death was a murder.
16	6	"Farewell, My Bunny"	Meera Menon	Adria Lang	December 26, 2019
The group attends Henderson's funeral, and Love remembers her last days with her late husband. After catching Candace in a small lie, Love hires a private investigator to follow her. Candace appears at Joe's apartment while he is out, so he goes to her place at night to eliminate her. Meanwhile, Candace breaks into Joe's apartment, but Love is waiting for her. Love has learned Candace's identity and troubled history, and Candace counters with the truth about Joe's past. Love confronts Joe, who convinces her that he fled New York to get away from obsessive Candace, and that her darker accusations are lies. Love breaks up with him anyway, but Forty insists Joe keep his job. Joe comforts Delilah, who is upset that Henderson's transgressions will never be made public, and they have sex.
17	7	"Ex-istential Crisis"	Shannon Kohli	Kelli Breslin	December 26, 2019
After breaking up with Joe, Love rebounds with Milo, her late husband's best friend. Joe tries to get into the dating game by downloading an app for book lovers, only to get disappointed with flawed dates. Joe follows Milo hiking, but encounters Gabe, who takes him to a very emotional spiritual treatment. Delilah thanks Joe for suggesting she write an article about her experience with Henderson, and they end up drinking, having sex on the street and being arrested for it. Fincher refuses to help them, so Forty uses his connections to bail them out. Milo tries to take his relationship with Love to the next level, but she is not ready to commit. Forty picks a fight with Milo, getting Joe involved and angering Love. Fincher's suspicions about Joe's involvement in Henderson's death prompts Delilah to search his apartment. She finds the storage unit keys, and is taking pictures of the vault when Joe arrives, tipped off by his nanny cam. He locks her inside, but says he will let her go the next day after he has safely left town.
18	8	"Fear and Loathing in Beverly Hills"	Harry Jierjian	Kara Lee Corthron & Justin W. Lo	December 26, 2019
Forty arranges a self-kidnapping, and he and Joe are locked in a hotel room to polish Forty's script, assisted by Ellie. Joe is uneasy but realizes that he will only leave on time to escape before Delilah's release if he helps them. They go over the script, and Ellie suggests they rewrite it from scratch. Forty gets frustrated and escapes from the room. Joe follows him into a bar, and Forty drugs him with LSD to help the creative process. Love finds Joe's farewell letter. Joe tries to stay sane while Forty works on the script, but hallucinates and loses time. Joe reconciles with Love, who convinces him to stay in LA, and Forty finally finishes the script, deducing correctly that Beck's ex-boyfriend killed her in a crime of passion. Forty confesses to Joe that as a teen he blacked out and murdered his au pair lover. The next morning when he wakes up, Joe races to Delilah before the handcuff timer can go off, only to find her dead inside the vault.
19	9	"P.I. Joe"	Silver Tree	Michael Foley & Mairin Reed	December 26, 2019
Joe tries to retrace his steps while under the influence because he does not believe he murdered Delilah. Suspecting Will, Joe calls him in, but he is in Manila as promised. Joe learns from Calvin that he came to Anavrin with Forty to get some groceries. Joe learns from Forty that he dropped Joe off to "visit Delilah" and then Forty called Candace. Candace and Forty argue, but in examining her video call from Forty, Candace sees Joe and the location where he was dropped off. She arrives at the storage unit to find Joe standing over Delilah's body in the vault, and locks Joe in. She calls Love to prove to her that Joe is a very dangerous man. Love arrives and Joe, believing he murdered Delilah, confesses everything to Love, and apologizes to Candace. Love then murders Candace and professes her love for Joe.
20	10	"Love, Actually"	Silver Tree	Sera Gamble & Neil Reynolds	December 26, 2019
Love reveals to Joe that she made him fall in love with her by meticulously studying his past. She also admits to murdering both Forty's au-pair and Delilah. Joe's image of Love is shattered as he understands that he is "her Beck". Love then explains that she has a plan to give them and Forty a way to build a real family: she will implicate Ellie in Henderson's murder but then have the Quinn family lawyers get the case closed, and also stage Delilah's death as a suicide caused by the backlash from her article. Joe is tempted to kill Love but stops after she reveals she is pregnant with his baby. At Lucy and Sunrise's wedding, Joe decides to love and stay with Love. Convinced that Joe was Beck's real murderer, Forty tries to save Love from him. Joe finds Ellie, reveals Delilah's fate, and sends her away with money before Child Protective Services can come for her. Forty confronts Joe with a gun at Anavrin but is shot and killed by Fincher. Forty is suspected of being involved in Henderson and Candace's deaths, and Love uses her family's connections to clear the way. Joe and Love move into a new house, and Joe's obsessive patterns resurface when he reveals his interest in their new female neighbour.

== Production ==
=== Development ===
You was renewed for a second season in July 2018, by Lifetime. In November 2018, Gamble confirmed that like Hidden Bodies, the sequel novel to You, the setting of the series would move to Los Angeles for the second season. On December 3, 2018, it was confirmed that Lifetime had passed on the series and that Netflix picked up the series ahead of the release of the second season.

=== Casting ===
On January 30, 2019, it was announced that Victoria Pedretti had been cast in the main role of Love Quinn on the second season. On January 31, 2019, James Scully was cast in a main role as Forty Quinn, Love's brother and Jenna Ortega was also cast in a main role as Ellie Alves.

On February 1, 2019, Deadline Hollywood reported that Ambyr Childers had been promoted to a series regular role, ahead of the premiere of the second season. On February 6, 2019, Adwin Brown was cast in the recurring role of Calvin on the second season. On February 15, 2019, Robin Lord Taylor was cast in the recurring role of Will on the second season. On February 21, 2019, Carmela Zumbado was cast in the series regular role of Delilah Alves on the second season. On March 4, 2019, Marielle Scott had been cast in the recurring role of Lucy on the second season. On March 5, 2019, Chris D'Elia was cast in the recurring role of Henderson on the second season. On March 26, 2019, Charlie Barnett was cast in the recurring role of Gabe on the second season. On April 4, 2019, Melanie Field and Magda Apanowicz were cast in recurring roles as Sunrise and Sandy, respectively. On June 4, 2019, Danny Vasquez had been cast in a recurring role. On June 24, 2019, it was confirmed that John Stamos would reprise his role as Dr. Nicky in the second season. On October 17, 2019, Elizabeth Lail confirmed in a BUILD Series interview that she would reprise her role as Guinevere Beck in a guest appearance on the second season.

=== Filming ===
Filming for the second season took place on location in Los Angeles, California, from February 2019 to June 2019.

== Reception ==
The second season received positive reviews from critics. On the review aggregator website Rotten Tomatoes, the season holds an 87% approval rating with an average rating of 8.01/10 based on 45 reviews. The website's critical consensus reads, "Penn Badgley's perversely endearing serial stalker keeps looking for love in all the wrong places during a second season that maintains the subversive tension while adding some welcome variations on the series' formula." On Metacritic, the second season has a weighted average score of 74 out of 100, based on 17 critics, indicating "generally favorable" reviews.

Alicia Lutes of IGN gave the second season, an 8.7/10, stating that "You goes the distance in its second season, giving us plenty of reasons to hang around Joe Goldberg's toxic Nice Guy Serial Killer Shack a little longer" and adds that the "show's twists and turns take us places both expected and unexpected, putting a larger focus on the internal struggle of Joe's obsessive personality." Robyn Bahr from The Hollywood Reporter mentioned in a glowing review of the second season, that "You remains as captivating as ever. Any other show would beg you to love its protagonist while revealing their childhood trauma. This one reminds you to keep your empathy under lock and key." Sonia Saraiya from Vanity Fair recommended the second season in her review by highlighting that "You is committed to keeping the audience guessing, and as with the first season, much of the story is a chain of wild twists". Commending the show writers' approach in the second season, she adds that "You exhibits no sophomore slump".

Tilly Pearce from Metro praised the second season, stating that it is "You Season 2 is more than enough to quench your thirst for twisted-in-a-sexy-way killers and keep you hooked for a serious binge session. The show doesn't exactly change the wheel when it comes to the format, but ultimately there's enough changes that you can get over it quickly. Penn Badgley is perfect in this role, as is Victoria Pedretti, and we can't wait to see what season three (assuming it happens) brings."

Joshua Rivera of The Verge gave the second season a positive recommendation, writing that "At first, it seems like You is simply repeating itself, playing the same beats with a different woman in Joe's sights..." but adds that due to "a combination of Badgley's performance and the incredible savvy of every member of the crew that points a camera or light at him, you frequently suffer whiplash for liking him, as he goes from charming book nerd to sardonic lead to super creep in the same shot." Clémence Michallon of The Independent gave the second season a very positive review, writing: "What follows is a dark psychological thriller that manages to be in every way as enthralling as its predecessor – a rare feat in a world where too many TV shows fail to quit while they're ahead." He said further, "Rivetingly told and well acted, YOU manages to make a viscerally unlikable protagonist endlessly interesting. That is no small achievement."

In a positive review of the second season, Angelica Jade Bastién from Vulture wrote that, "You proves itself to be a momentous, darkly spun treat this season that doles out blissful fun while providing fascinating commentary about the nature of desire, and it continues to be a great showcase for Badgley's wiry menace." Kimberly Ricci from Uproxx complimented the second season in her review, adding that it "begins as twisted comfort food for fans, but by midseason, it becomes clear that this is a whole new stalker ballgame." She concluded with a positive recommendation, noting that "the season finale dangles a promise of even more madness to come." LaToya Ferguson from IndieWire gave the series an A− grade, praising the second season for its "sly sense of humor" which she further adds "continues to make the series pretty funny". She ends her review in a recommendation, highlighting that the second season "proves Season 1 wasn't lightning in a bottle".

== Release ==
=== Marketing ===
On December 5, 2019, a teaser trailer for the second season was released by Netflix. On December 16, 2019, the official trailer for the second season was released. The second season was released on December 26, 2019.
