= Joe Goldberg =

Protagonist of You by Caroline Kepnes

- You character
- Penn Badgley as Joe Goldberg
- First appearance: Novel: You (2014); Television: "Pilot" (September 9, 2018)
- Last appearance: Novel: You First: A Joe Goldberg Prequel (2026); Television: "Finale" (April 24, 2025)
- Created by: Caroline Kepnes
- Portrayed by: Penn Badgley; Ed Speleers (Note: Speelers portrays a manifestation of Joe's darker impulses in season 4.) (season 4); Gianni Ciardiello (teenager); Aidan Wallace (child); Jack Fisher (child)

In-universe information
- Full name: Joseph Gabriel Passero (birth name); Joseph Gabriel Goldberg (legal name)
- Aliases: Jeff Pevensey; Nathan Herzog; Spencer Hewitt; Paul Brown; Dan Fox; Will Bettelheim; Nick Trespidi; Jay; Jonathan Moore; Ezra
- Occupation: Former bookstore clerk Former bookstore manager Former librarian Former literature professor Philanthropist; Bookstore owner
- Family: Raphael Passero (biological father); Sandy Goldberg (biological mother); Ivan Mooney (adoptive father); Jacob Goldberg (biological half-brother)
- Spouses: Love Quinn (first wife); Kate Lockwood (second wife)
- Significant others: Candace Stone (1st); Guinevere Beck (2nd); Marienne Bellamy (4th); Louise Flannery (6th)
- Children: Henry Goldberg (son)
- Origin: Jewish-Italian
- Nationality: American

Joseph Gabriel Goldberg is the antihero protagonist of You, a series of thriller novels by Caroline Kepnes. In the television adaptation of the same name, he is portrayed by Penn Badgley.

Joe is a serial killer from New York City who develops extreme obsessions with various women that he dates, leading him to stalk and invade their private lives. As the series progresses, he travels to Los Angeles and London, England, assuming new identities to hide from law enforcement. Despite attempts to suppress his psychopathic tendencies, his relationships continue to culminate in murder, and he habitually kills those who pose a threat to himself and the people close to him.

Badgley's portrayal of Joe has garnered critical acclaim. Praise has been directed towards his ability to portray Joe as both sympathetic and charismatic in contrast to the character's otherwise sinister and violent tendencies. For his portrayal, Badgley was nominated for the Saturn Award for Best Actor in a Streaming Television Series at the 45th Saturn Awards.

== Television series ==
=== Background ===
Joe was born on September 19, 1988, to Sandy Goldberg and Raphael Passero. Joe and Sandy were continually abused by Raphael, and, seeking to protect his mother, Joe shoots and kills him. Sandy later gives Joe up to Child Protection Services, and he is sent to a group home.

Joe would later be adopted by Ivan Mooney (Mark Blum), a former Soviet prison guard who raised him in a strict, abusive manner. After Joe kills a music executive with whom his ex-girlfriend, Candace Stone (Ambyr Childers), was having an affair, Mooney helps Joe get away with it. After Candace breaks up with Joe, he takes her into the woods and believes to have killed her after striking her with a rock.

Several years later, Ivan would suffer a stroke, leading to Joe becoming the manager of Mooney's. He develops a close relationship with Paco (Luca Padovan), the son of his next-door neighbor, Claudia (Victoria Cartagena), a drug addict who is in an abusive relationship with Ron Baker (Daniel Cosgrove), an ex-parole officer who recognizes Joe's psychopathy.

=== Season 1 ===
Joe begins stalking MFA student Guinevere Beck (Elizabeth Lail). He steals her phone and learns of Benji Ashby, an on-again, off-again boyfriend, whom he kidnaps and keeps in a plexiglass cage that houses Mooney's rarest books. After Benji shares a video of his involvement in an accidental death during a frat hazing incident, Joe uses his peanut allergy to kill him.

Beck introduces Joe to her wealthy best friend Peach Salinger (Shay Mitchell), who disapproves of him. While helping her shop, Beck confides in Joe about her deceased father. Afterward, Joe burns Benji's remains in the woods. Later that night, Beck invites Joe to her apartment, and the two have sex. Using Beck's old phone, he discovers that Beck is texting an anonymous man referred to as "The Captain," and Joe leaves abruptly.

Joe discovers that The Captain is her father, Edward Beck (Michael Park). Beck tells Joe that her father is a former drug addict whom she's been estranged from since he became sober. Joe and Beck begin dating, but soon argue about Peach sabotaging Beck's career. Peach calls Beck during a suicide attempt, which Joe doubts the sincerity of. Joe steals Peach's laptop and discovers that she has been infatuated with Beck for years. Joe follows Peach in Central Park and attempts to kill her with a rock, but she survives. Later, Joe is brutally beaten by Ron, who Paco drugged in an attempt to kill him.

Joe secretly follows Beck and Peach to her family estate and witnesses Peach attempt to initiate a threesome with Beck and Raj (Gerrard Lobo), a college friend. The next morning, he watches Peach and Beck argue about the previous night. After Beck storms out, he is caught by Peach, who holds him at gunpoint. After a short struggle, he takes the gun and shoots Peach, framing it as a suicide. A few weeks later, Joe begins seeing therapist Dr. Nicky (John Stamos), using aliases for himself and Beck to talk about their relationship. Suspicious that Beck is cheating with Nicky, he follows her but is caught by her. Joe realizes that Beck is better off without him, and they break up.

Joe begins dating Karen, a friend of Claudia, as Beck's writing career blossoms. Despite their attempts to move on from each other, they rekindle their relationship. Joe breaks up with Karen and gets back with Beck. After investigating rumors of Candace's sudden disappearance, Beck confronts Joe about her. Joe explains that she cheated on him and has since moved to Europe, which satisfies her.

Joe discovers that Beck did have an affair with Dr. Nicky, but forgives her. After discovering that Beck found his cache of evidence, Joe knocks her out and locks her in the glass cage. While imprisoned, Beck writes a book framing Dr. Nicky. Meanwhile, Joe kills Ron to protect Paco and Claudia. Beck manages to convince Joe to let her leave before stabbing him. After Beck fails to convince Paco to unlock the basement door, she is caught and killed by Joe. Four months later, Beck's posthumous memoir has become a hit, and Paco and Claudia leave for California. Suddenly, Candace walks in, stunning Joe.

=== Season 2 ===
Joe escapes Candace and moves to Los Angeles. He steals the identity of Will Bettelheim (Robin Lord Taylor), a tech-savvy conspiracy theorist, and keeps him in the glass cage inside a storage unit. Joe develops an obsession with Love Quinn (Victoria Pedretti), the daughter of the wealthy Ray (Michael Reilly Burke) and Dottie Quinn (Saffron Burrows), who co-own the upscale grocery store Anavrin. He secures an apartment and befriends the building manager, Delilah Alves (Carmela Zumbado), and her teenage sister, Ellie (Jenna Ortega). He gets a job at Anavrin, which Love co-manages alongside her brother Forty Quinn (James Scully). Joe and Love spend a night out together, after which Love reveals she is widowed.

Joe kills Jasper Krenn (Steven W. Bailey), a man Will owed money to, and disposes of the body using butcher tools at Anavrin. Joe and Love agree to only be friends but begin a sexual relationship, which is challenged by Forty's emotional dependency. Joe learns that Delilah is a victim of rape by Henderson (Chris D'Elia), a famous comedian. He discovers that Ellie has developed a professional relationship with him, and he warns her to stay away from him. With Will's help, Joe discovers that Henderson has a sex dungeon and finds a box containing Polaroids of Henderson's victims, including Delilah. After learning that the photos are inadmissible, Joe attempts to elicit a video confession. The plan goes awry, and Joe accidentally kills him. Convinced that Will is trustworthy due to his help with Henderson, he frees him from the cage.

Joe discovers that Forty is dating a woman named Amy Adam, who turns out to be Candace. Love informs Joe that Forty is a victim of sexual assault by an au pair when he was a young boy, and Joe tells her about his own childhood. Candace tells Joe that Forty is developing a screenplay adapting Beck's memoir. After investigating Candace, Joe learns that she told Love the truth about his past, but he explains to Love that he left New York to escape her lies. Love accepts his explanation but breaks up with him.

Joe and Delilah hook up publicly but are arrested for lewd conduct by Delilah's ex-fling, Officer David Fincher (David Vasquez). Meanwhile, Love begins a relationship with Milo Warrington (Andrew Creer), her late husband's best friend. After being released, Joe finds out that Delilah has discovered the cage and locks her inside. Before he can return, Forty sets up a self-abduction scheme to get Joe and Ellie's help with the script. Joe and Forty trip on LSD and go on a drug-fueled escapade. Joe and Love reconcile, and Love convinces him to stay in Los Angeles. Forty correctly infers that Beck's ex-boyfriend is the true culprit and confesses to Joe that he killed the au pair who assaulted him as a child.

The next day, Joe finds Delilah dead but cannot remember if he killed her. He attempts to remember the previous night's events, but is discovered with Delilah's body by Candace. She locks him in the cage and calls Love. Joe confesses his crimes to Love, who kills Candace to prevent her from calling the police. Love reveals to Joe that she was responsible for killing the au pair and that she killed Delilah to protect him. She informs Joe of her plan to clean up Delilah and Henderson's murders. Disturbed, Joe prepares to kill her before she reveals that she is pregnant. Meanwhile, Forty investigates Beck's murder and discovers the truth after interviewing Dr. Nicky, who recognizes a photo of Joe. He returns to save Love, and while holding Joe at gunpoint, Forty is killed by Officer Fincher.

Several months later, Joe and Love move to the Madre Linda suburb in Northern California. While in the backyard, he sees his neighbor and begins another obsession.

=== Season 3 ===
Joe struggles to balance his obsession with Natalie Engler (Michaela McManus), his marriage to Love, and their son, Henry. Love deduces that Joe is infatuated with Natalie and kills her in the basement of her bakery, where the glass cage is now kept. Natalie's husband, Matthew Engler (Scott Speedman), conducts his own investigation.

Joe and Love kidnap Gil Brigham (Mackenzie Astin), a Madre Linda resident and anti-vaxxer, who infected Henry with measles. They attempt to blackmail Gil using a sexual assault that his son committed, but Gil commits suicide out of guilt, which Joe and Love use to frame him for Natalie's murder. Joe begins restoring rare books at a library to sell and help support Ellie. There, he befriends Marienne (Tati Gabrielle), the librarian whom he becomes obsessed with.

Joe goes on a retreat with Cary Conrad (Travis Van Winkle), the husband of Sherry (Shalita Grant), on the behest of his and Love's therapist. Joe discovers that Love has gotten close with Theo (Dylan Arnold), the teenage son of Matthew. Joe begins stalking Marienne and discovers that she is in a custody battle with Ryan Goodwin (Scott Michael Foster), a news reporter and abusive ex-boyfriend. He helps Marienne recover books during a sprinkler malfunction at the library, and the two kiss. Later, he and Love agree to keep Theo close as a source of information on Matthew's investigation.

Dottie Quinn confides to Joe that Love may have killed her first husband, James (Daniel Durant). Joe testifies at Marienne's custody hearing, but learns that Ryan released explicit images of her to sabotage her case. Joe and Love attempt swinging with Cary and Sherry at their request, which causes Love to have a jealous outburst. The Conrads overhear Love admit to Natalie's death, and after a brief struggle, are captured and locked in the cage by Joe and Love.

Marienne tells Joe that Ryan plans to take their daughter to New Jersey and invites him home, where the two have sex. Joe begins to stalk Ryan again, and Joe kills him. Theo discovers surveillance footage of Joe leaving the bakery with Natalie's body and is bludgeoned by Love.

Love discovers Joe's obsession with Marienne and prepares dinner, planning to poison him using aconite. Love calls Marienne over and reveals to her that Joe killed Ryan. Marienne leaves, and Love prepares to kill Joe. Aware of Love's plan, Joe ingests an antidote and injects her with the aconite. Joe stages her murder as a murder-suicide and blows up their house. Before leaving Los Angeles, Joe leaves Henry in the care of Dante (Ben Mehl) and adopts the identity "Nick Trespidi", leaving for Paris in search of Marienne.

=== Season 4 ===
==== Part 1 ====
Joe tracks Marienne to London. An assassin hired by the Quinn family offers Joe a new identity in exchange for killing Marienne. After pretending to kill her, Joe assumes the identity of Jonathan Moore, a university English professor. He becomes interested in Kate Galvin (Charlotte Ritchie), the girlfriend of his colleague Malcom Harding (Stephen Hagan).

Joe is invited to an aristocratic party by Kate, where he befriends mayoral candidate Rhys Montrose (Ed Speleers) and other members of Kate's circle. After heavy drinking, Joe wakes up the next day to find Malcolm murdered. He receives anonymous texts thanking him after disposing of the body. After Simon (Aidan Cheng) is murdered, Joe returns home to find newspaper clippings of his past crimes. The murderer is dubbed the "Eat-the-Rich Killer" by the media. Joe learns that Malcom had a relationship with one of his students, Nadia (Amy-Leigh Hickman). Later, he kills bodyguard Vic (Sean Pertwee) after Vic discovers Malcolm's ring on him. Protective of Kate, Joe develops a close relationship with her.

Kate reveals that her father, Tom Lockwood (Greg Kinnear), is a powerful magnate. Simon's sister, Gemma (Even Austin), is murdered while at a weekend getaway hosted by Lady Phoebe (Tilly Keeper), and Kate is framed. Joe helps Kate dispose of Gemma's body, and he admits that he is being framed for Malcolm's murder. Roald (Ben Wiggins), who is also obsessed with Kate, discovers Joe in the barn and pursues him with a shotgun. Joe subdues Roald but is kidnapped and locked in the dungeon by Rhys Montrose, who reveals himself to be the killer. Joe is ordered to kill Roald and frame him, but the two manage to escape, keeping his knowledge of Rhys a secret.

==== Part 2 ====
Rhys orders Joe to frame someone for the murders and to kill Tom, who reveals that he is aware of Joe's previous identity. Tom contracts Joe to kill Rhys, and he discovers that Rhys has kidnapped Marienne. Joe tracks down Rhys and unsuccessfully tortures him for Marienne's location. Joe chokes Rhys to death, but continues to see him, discovering that he has developed a split personality that took the form of Rhys; and that he never met Rhys. Joe realizes that he is the Eat-the-Rich Killer and has kidnapped Marienne.

Joe makes arrangements to help Marienne escape and discovers that she has lost custody of her daughter. Marienne seemingly commits suicide via overdose, and he disposes of her body at a park. Unbeknownst to him, Nadia, who was investigating Joe, plotted with Marienne to fake the latter's death to escape.

Joe kills Tom and his bodyguard before attempting suicide out of guilt for Marienne. Realizing that he is a killer and discovering that Nadia has been spying on him, he murders her boyfriend and frames her. Kate uses her resources to expunge Joe's record, and they return to New York.

=== Season 5 ===
Three years later, Joe returns to New York with Kate and Henry (Frankie DeMaio). Kate's position as CEO of her father's company is endangered by her half-siblings Teddy (Griffin Matthews) and Reagan Lockwood (Anna Camp). Kate becomes disturbed by Joe's dark nature and discovers that her mentor, Bob (Michael Dempsey), was responsible for a hit piece that would reveal Kate's involvement in covering up Rhys' death. Joe kills Bob and frames it as a suicide. Later, Joe meets and becomes infatuated with Bronte (Madeline Brewer), who is a former student of Guinevere Beck. Bronte is a part of an online group alongside Dominique (Natasha Behnam), Phoenix (b), and Clayton (Tom Francis), who poses as an abusive ex-boyfriend.

Joe offers to kill Reagan, who accuses Kate of orchestrating Bob's murder. Later that night, Joe accidentally kidnaps Reagan's twin sister, Maddie (Anna Camp). While with Bronte, Joe witnesses her get accosted by Clayton. He comforts her afterward and becomes obsessed. Joe goes to Reagan's house and kidnaps her, later forcing Maddie to kill Reagan in exchange for her freedom. Afterward, Joe reopens Mooney's, and Maddie, posing as Reagan, steps down from her position. Convinced that their marriage is broken, Joe has an affair with Bronte.

Joe promises Maddie to cover up Reagan's murder, and afterward learns that Bronte has left town. Kate informs Joe that she is planning to divorce him. He goes to Bronte's house, and after overhearing an argument between her and Clayton, Joe kills him. Dominique and Phoenix barge in and reveal that they have livestreamed Joe killing Clayton. Joe is bailed out of jail by Kate's lawyers, and she reveals that he has been tricked into signing custody papers.

Joe becomes infamous in New York, and Bronte, now unsure of Joe's guilt, abandons her plans to expose him. Joe tries to rehabilitate his image using interviews set up by Maddie and begins to grow a following of supporters. Kate travels to London and discovers that Joe is the Eat-the-Rich Killer. Afterward, he saves Bronte from Dane (Jefferson White), a potential kidnapper.

Harrison (Pete Ploszek), Reagan's husband, discovers that she is actually Maddie but narrowly escapes being murdered after falling in love with Maddie and agreeing to keep it a secret. Bronte frees Dane, but he is later killed by Joe. During a phone conversation with Kate, she declares that Joe must die. Joe frames Harrison for killing Reagan, Maddie is arrested, and he resolves to kill Kate. He is lured into a trap by Kate, Nadia, and Marienne. Bronte is convinced of Joe's guilt, and he escapes as Kate prepares to kill him. Maddie locks Joe and Kate in the basement before setting Mooney's on fire. Joe's confession is recorded by Kate before he is saved by Bronte. While trying to cross into Canada alongside Bronte, she corners him and forces Joe to explain the circumstances of Beck's murder, which he refuses. Joe calls Henry, but Henry calls him a monster. He attempts to kill Bronte and kills a police officer while escaping. Bronte returns and shoots Joe in the genitals. While reading fan mail in prison, Joe is disturbed by the amount of fan mail he receives, believing that society is the problem, not him.

== Development ==
In 2014, Caroline Kepnes released her first novel of the thriller series, You. Kepnes explained that she wrote the novel during a dark period of her life, the year her father died of cancer, and in which she experienced several other personal challenges. Later, Kepnes was initially hesitant on labeling Joe, as a few readers argued that his actions classified him as a serial killer, such as Ted Bundy. The author then clarified her position on the matter, citing that "I remember when I wrote You and someone first referred to Joe as a serial killer. I argued 'he's not a serial killer, he meets these terrible people and has these awful thoughts, but he's very sensitive'. It's very strange to realize you have written a serial killer."

Sera Gamble, the showrunner and co-creator of the television adaptation mentioned in an interview with Collider, that when envisioning Joe, the main protagonist of the series, she wanted to delve deeply into the root cause of the pathology that shaped his amoral position to justify and rationalize stalking, kidnapping and killing his victims. When she was writing the character, she stated that "I want to understand what coaxes behavior of this nature out of that very tiny percentage of men. I like to think it's a very tiny percentage of men who would cross a line like the line that Joe Goldberg crosses". In an interview at The Contenders Emmys 2019 panel, Gamble highlighted the importance of casting the right person to play the role of Joe Goldberg. She stated that "it had to be a love story and a horror movie in every single scene", further adding that if they "cast someone who was sort of creepy, then the story wouldn't work; the idea is that it's a lead in a romantic comedy who works in a bookstore and a woman walks in, they have a cute meet and fall in love and live happily ever after. That's the show."

Expanding on her commentary on the show's themes and origin, Gamble stated at The Hollywood Reporter's roundtable interview, that she was not surprised to hear an overwhelming reception to Joe's character amongst online fans and viewers, citing that "There's a very vocal contingent of fans of Caroline Kepnes' book [on which You is based] who were like, "I heart Joe." Essentially what she's done is taken the classic romantic hero and just peeled back the gloss and sheen and John Cusack with the boombox and she followed it to its logical conclusion. I mean, if you turn off the sappy music and turn on a David Fincher score, romantic comedies are stalker movies. The plot of pretty much every one I can think of — and we have watched all of them many times in the writers room — is contingent on the guy ... well, first of all, he has to do a certain amount of fucking up so she can forgive him. And he has to get over some of her shortcomings. I mean, that's love, right? But also, he's chasing her through a fucking airport, chasing her on a freeway, watching her sleep because he feels protective. Romantic comedy behavior in real life is criminal! And that was basically the starting place for the show."

== Portrayal ==
Penn Badgley was cast in the lead character of Joe Goldberg in June 2017. Prior to the show's premiere, Badgley mentioned his disinterest in playing the character of Joe Goldberg in an interview with Entertainment Weekly, saying that "I didn't want to do it — it was too much. I was conflicted with the nature of the role. If this is a love story, what is it saying? It's not an average show; it's a social experiment." However, he was strongly convinced by the script and the social commentary around the series, adding that "what was key in me wanting to jump on board were my conversations with Greg Berlanti and Sera Gamble, the creators, and understanding Joe's humanity. I knew that I would be conflicted about the role from day one till the last day, and that is why they thought I would be good for it, is that I'm not psyched to play somebody of this nature."

Relaying similar thoughts in an interview with GQ, Badgley again raised his concerns of portraying Joe, noting that he was first apprehensive at the role but later changed his mind, expressing that "no one in any position of authority could ever try to act as though we don't know that sex and murder sells, but how can it work in a different way we've not seen? That's where I think this show does something that none of us could have said for certain that we would nail. It could have been really irresponsible. It could have fallen flat and been like, whoa." In another interview at The Contenders Emmys 2019 panel, Badgley mentioned that his character was "the hero of his own story...every serial killer is" but added that Joe is "ultimately, the word that's coming to mind is un-saveable". The actor highlighted that, though there is an apparent affinity to Joe's character, it is somewhat of a "Rorschach test of a kind for us," adding that "we're failing..."

== Reception ==
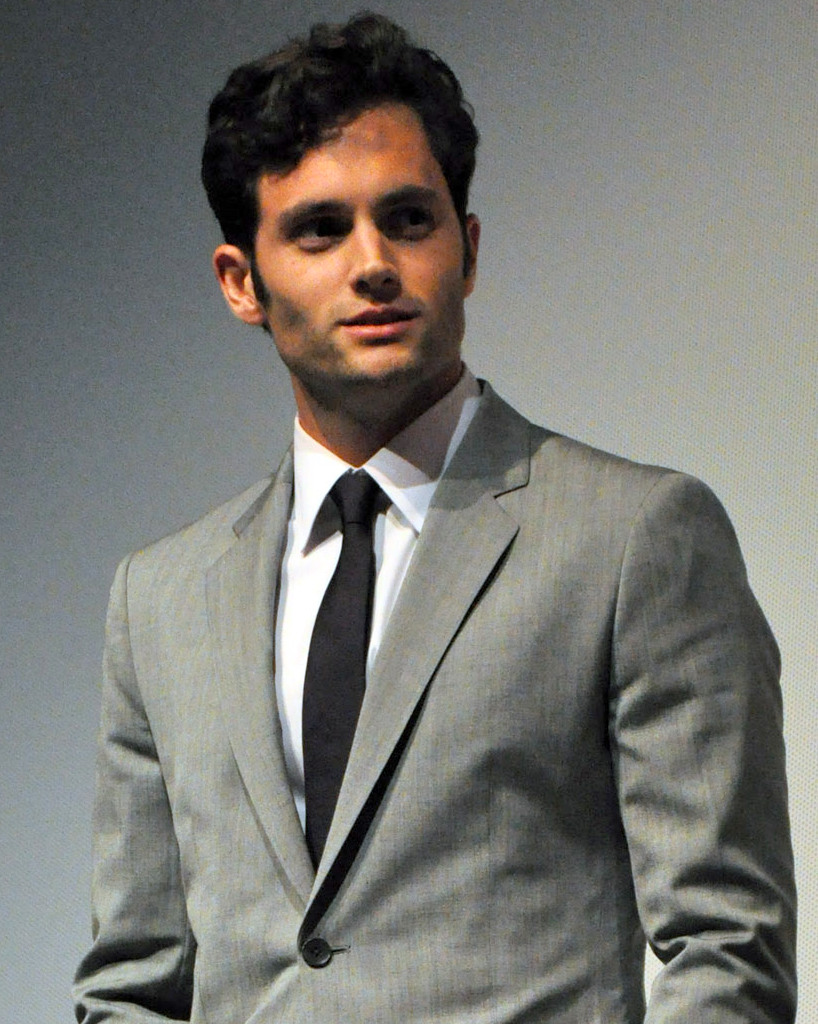
Penn Badgley at the 2010 Toronto International Film Festival.

=== Critical response ===
Penn Badgley's portrayal of Joe Goldberg has received critical acclaim. Many reviewers gave praise to Penn Badgley's performance and compared the tone established in the series to the themes of violence and stalking, reminiscent in contemporary thriller films and series like Dexter, Gone Girl, and American Psycho. Certain reviewers have also highlighted that the series provides insight into the mind and profile of a psychopath in order to convince the audience "to sympathize with a stalker" and "serial killer".

Alicia Lutes of IGN praised Badgley's performance in her review of the series, highlighting that he is "doing some of his best, most unhinged work in the series. His charming nature and playful face are the perfect, twisted mask for the 'Nice Guy With Control Issues' lurking underneath" and further adding that "Joe's inner monologue frames the series in a way that shows just how malcontented a guy he really is despite his warm smile and cool demeanor."

Tiffany Kelly from Daily Dot praised Badgley's performance in her review of the series by stating that he "shines as a bookstore manager and bone-chilling stalker in this surprisingly good thriller." While reviewing the first season, Anna Leszkiewicz from New Statesman praised Penn Badgley's performance, declaring that the "Netflix series You does what it says on the tin – offering surprise twists, drip-fed reveals, a magnetic villain in Joe, the horrible suspense of knowing more than his clueless victims and satisfyingly gory murders." Christina Radish of Collider named Joe Goldberg as the "Best TV Villain" of 2018. Radish wrote that, "thanks to the performance given by Penn Badgley and some terrific writing, the character has layers that make him complicated and intriguing, even though you know he should be making you cringe and recoil. Joe Goldberg is a character that does horrible things, but also keeps you so engrossed that you can't stop watching." Tilly Pearce from Metro gave high praise to the actor's performance in the second season, noting that "Penn Badgley is perfect in this role, as is Victoria Pedretti, and we can't wait to see what season three (assuming it happens) brings."

Samantha Highfill from Entertainment Weekly mentioned You in her wish list of contenders for the 2019 Emmy Nominations. Praising Badgley's performance, she notes that the series "presented a different look at a serial killer, one that took viewers inside the mind of Joe Goldberg, thereby presenting them with the reasoning for his actions. By never shying away from Joe's dark side, the show's freshman season unraveled a beautifully paced modern-day thriller about what people do for love...and what is acceptable to do for love."

Team TVLine ranked the performances of Penn Badgley and Victoria Pedretti at the top of The TVLine Performers of the Week list. Praising the two, the team notes that "embodying a sympathetic serial killer is no easy feat, yet Penn Badgley has spent the past two seasons of You making the process appear effortless. And just as his character, Joe Goldberg, finally met his match this season in the form of a woman named Love, so too has Badgley found the perfect on-screen companion in Love's portrayer, Victoria Pedretti."
