= You season 1 =

You
- Season 1
- Promotional poster
- Showrunner: Sera Gamble
- Starring: Penn Badgley; Elizabeth Lail; Luca Padovan; Zach Cherry; Shay Mitchell
- No. of episodes: 10

Release
- Original network: Lifetime
- Original release: September 9 – November 11, 2018

Season chronology
- Next → Season 2

The first season of the American psychological thriller television series You, based on the novel of the same name by Caroline Kepnes, was ordered by Lifetime in April 2017. It stars Penn Badgley, Elizabeth Lail, Luca Padovan, Zach Cherry and Shay Mitchell. The 10-episode first season, which premiered on September 9, 2018, was produced by A&E Studios, in association with Alloy Entertainment, Berlanti Productions, and Warner Horizon Television; the showrunners were Greg Berlanti, Sera Gamble and Leslie Morgenstein.

== Synopsis ==
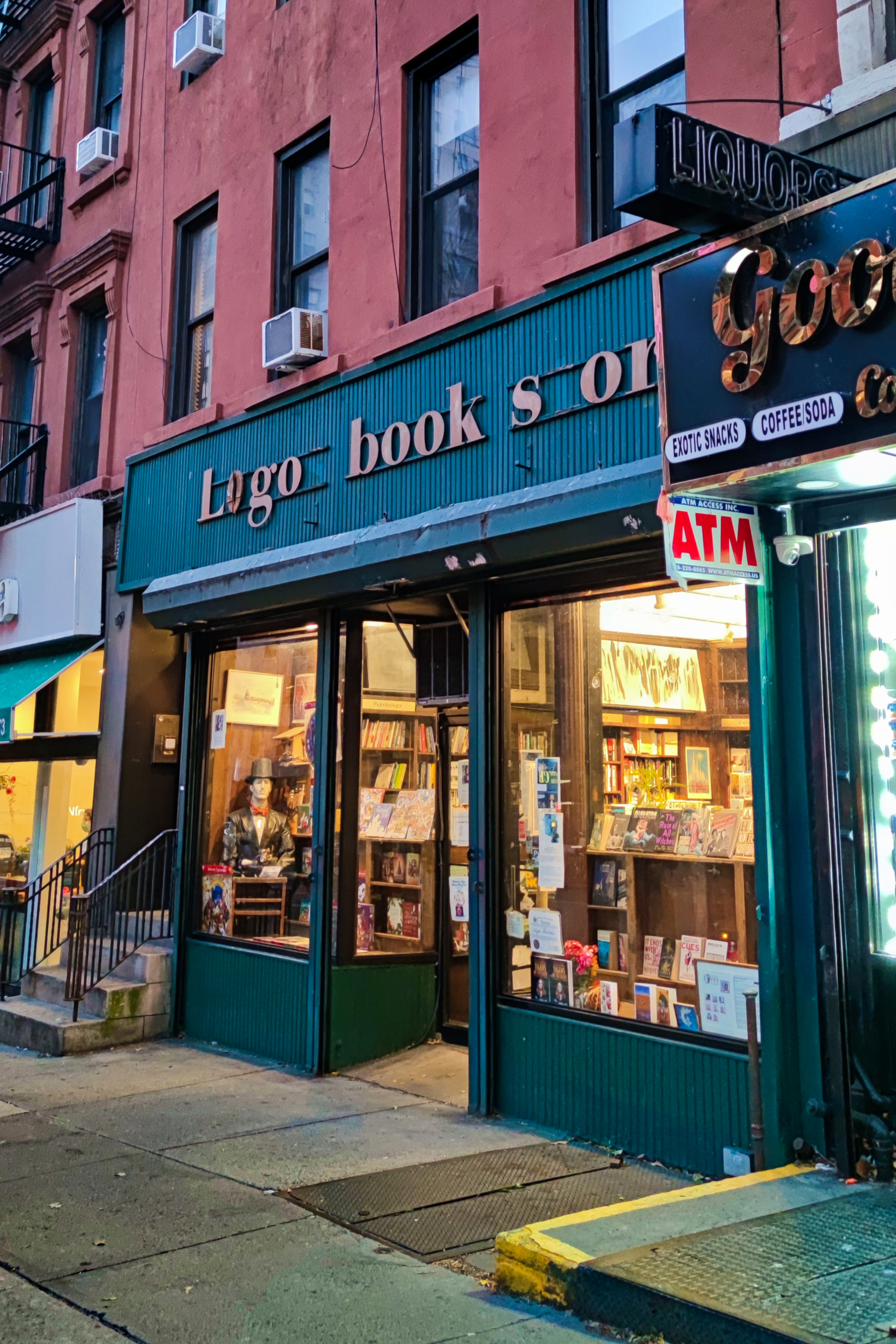
Logos Bookstore, the exterior used for Mooney's Books in You

The first season follows Joe Goldberg, a bookstore manager in New York, who meets Guinevere Beck, an aspiring writer, with whom he becomes immediately infatuated. To feed his sociopathic obsession, he soon turns to social media and technology to track her presence and eliminate any possible obstacles that stand in the way of their romance.

== Cast and characters ==
=== Main ===
- Penn Badgley as Joe Goldberg, a serial killer and bookstore manager at Mooney's who stalks and then dates Beck
- Elizabeth Lail as Guinevere Beck, a struggling graduate student and an aspiring writer
- Luca Padovan as Paco, Joe's young neighbor
- Zach Cherry as Ethan Russell, a bookstore clerk who works with Joe
- Shay Mitchell as Peach Salinger, (Note: Shay Mitchell is credited as a series regular for episodes 1 through 6 of the first season.) Beck's wealthy best friend

=== Recurring ===
- Daniel Cosgrove as Ron Baker, the abusive boyfriend of Claudia and a parole officer
- Kathryn Gallagher as Annika, one of Beck's friends, a social media influencer
- Nicole Kang as Lynn Lieser, another one of Beck's friends
- Victoria Cartagena as Claudia, Paco's mother
- Mark Blum as Ivan Mooney, the owner of Mooney's and Joe's adoptive father
- Hari Nef as Blythe, a rival graduate student to Beck
- John Stamos as Dr. Nicky Angevine, Beck's therapist

=== Guest ===
- Reg Rogers as Professor Paul Leahy, Beck's graduate school advisor who sexually harassed her
- Lou Taylor Pucci as Ben "Benji" Ashby, Beck's wealthy, toxic sex partner
- Michael Park as Edward Beck, Beck's father
- Emily Bergl as Nancy Whitesell, Edward's new wife and Beck's stepmother
- Michael Maize as Officer Nico, a Greenwich police officer
- Gerrard Lobo as Raj, a med student and an old friend of Beck and Peach
- Ambyr Childers as Candace, Joe's ex-girlfriend and a fledgling musician
- Natalie Paul as Karen Minty, Paco's babysitter and Joe's new girlfriend after his breakup with Beck
- Ryan Andes as Ross, a private investigator hired by Peach's family to look into her death

== Episodes ==
No. overall	No. in season	Title	Directed by	Written by	Original release date	U.S. viewers (millions)
1	1	"Pilot"	Lee Toland Krieger	Greg Berlanti & Sera Gamble	September 9, 2018	0.82
Bookstore manager Joe Goldberg meets aspiring writer Guinevere Beck, and an internet search about her leads to Joe following Beck around, monitoring her social interactions, and even entering her apartment while she is out. Joe is nearby when a drunken Beck falls onto the subway tracks, and he saves her. Joe takes Beck home but steals her phone, giving him full access to everything she does with her new phone due to it automatically synchronizing with her old one. Beck later stops by the bookstore to thank him for rescuing her, and he asks her out. Joe lures Beck's philandering boyfriend Benji to the basement of his shop, hits him in the head with a mallet, and locks him in a plexiglass book vault.
2	2	"The Last Nice Guy in New York"	Lee Toland Krieger	Sera Gamble	September 16, 2018	0.77
Joe is not sure what to do with Benji, who is a drug-addicted trust fund baby and desperate to be freed. Meanwhile, when Beck rejects her professor's advances, he threatens to take away her teaching assistant job and consequently, her housing. Beck's wealthy friend Peach is suspicious of Joe. Beck turns the tables on Professor Leahy by threatening to expose his sexual harassment of her and six other women. After obtaining a video of Benji hazing a fraternity pledge to death, Joe gives him a coffee laced with peanut oil, and Benji dies from an allergic reaction.
3	3	"Maybe"	Marcos Siega	April Blair	September 23, 2018	0.57
Joe plans how to get rid of Benji's body, while Beck is intimidated by Blythe, a rival graduate student. Joe doubles down on his efforts to convince Beck that he is "the one" for her after finding out that she is still having sex with other men in order to get over Benji. Joe overhears Beck telling her friends that she is not completely sure about Joe, calling him a "maybe". Beck opens up to Joe about her addict father, but their attempt at lovemaking is interrupted by Peach, who needs to be taken to the hospital for a chronic ailment. Joe is almost caught by hikers while he is burning Benji's body in the woods as he is talking to Beck on the phone. She invites him over to her apartment and they finally have sex, but he prematurely ejaculates.
4	4	"The Captain"	Vic Mahoney	Michael Foley	September 30, 2018	0.56
Beck surreptitiously messages her friends about Joe's disappointing lovemaking, which he sees via her old phone. Still monitoring her texts, Joe sees that Beck has made weekend plans with an older man she calls "The Captain" and lies to her friends about it. A jealous Joe follows her to a Charles Dickens festival in Nyack and soon learns that the man is her father, Edward, who she had previously said was dead. Meanwhile, Peach has learned that Joe is in Nyack, which forces him to reveal himself to Beck. They go to lunch with Edward and his new family, but Beck explodes at her critical and disapproving stepmother, Nancy. Beck explains to Joe that her father left her family after a drug overdose, and although he has overcome his addiction, she has kept him at a distance. Joe and Beck have sex again, this time much to Beck's satisfaction.
5	5	"Living with the Enemy"	Marta Cunningham	Neil Reynolds	October 7, 2018	0.57
Peach continues to be suspicious of Joe, who seeks a way to neutralize her. Peach makes a show of introducing Beck to a famous literary agent, but when he hits on Beck and tells her the negative things Peach said about her, Beck blows up at Peach. Joe sees through Peach's subsequent faked suicide attempt, and in accessing her laptop comes to realize she is infatuated with Beck. Knowing that Peach will always win Beck's attention, Joe follows Peach on her morning run in Central Park and hits her over the head with a rock. Joe arrives home to find that his neighbor Paco has drugged his abusive stepfather Ron to protect his mother. Joe saves Ron, but the unhinged Ron beats him. Joe learns that Peach is alive.
6	6	"Amour Fou"	Marcos Siega	Adria Lang	October 14, 2018	0.71
A recovering Peach is staying with Beck and she banishes Joe. Joe explains to Beck that Peach is in love with her and trying to keep Beck dependent on her. Joe secretly follows when Peach whisks Beck off to the Salinger family estate in Greenwich, but he hits his head and begins hallucinating his ex-girlfriend Candace. Peach invites her and Beck's old friend Raj over. They all ingest MDMA and Peach attempts to initiate a threesome with Beck and Raj. Beck turns down her advances and leaves the room to text Joe. Beck confronts Peach about the kiss and leaves, after which Peach discovers Joe in the house and pulls a gun on him. She accuses him of stalking her, and Joe reveals all that he knows about her. They wrestle for the gun, and Peach is killed. Joe types a suicide note on Peach's computer, leading detectives to believe that Peach shot herself.
7	7	"Everythingship"	Kellie Cyrus	April Blair & Amanda Zetterström	October 21, 2018	0.62
Joe makes an appointment with Beck's therapist, Dr. Nicky, using the alias "Paul". He talks about how his relationship with "Renaldo"—really Beck—was going well after Peach's death a month before but slowly deteriorated. With Beck becoming increasingly moody, distant, and secretive, Joe jealously follows her, but she catches him. He accuses her of cheating on him with her therapist, and she breaks up with Joe. In the present, Joe listens to one of Beck's therapy sessions on Dr. Nicky's computer, which makes Joe realize Beck is better off without him right now. He tells her what she wants to hear and lets her go.
8	8	"You Got Me, Babe"	Erin Feeley	Caroline Kepnes	October 28, 2018	0.49
Three months after his and Beck's breakup, Joe is happily dating Karen, and Beck's story about Peach's death has landed her a book deal. Beck begins to miss Joe and begins texting him after intentionally running into him at a food truck in Joe's neighborhood. Both Beck and Joe confide in Dr. Nicky: Beck denies flirting with Joe but is sure that Karen is wrong for him, while Joe is starting to compare his new love "Brad" (Karen) with his ex, "Renaldo" (Beck). Joe and Beck reconnect while helping Blythe move in with Ethan, and Joe and Beck later have sex. A tearful Beck admits to Joe that she now knows how good he was for her, but she was afraid to need him. Joe breaks up with Karen and rushes over to visit Beck, who agrees to get back together with him. Karen confronts Beck, leading her to become suspicious of Joe's past.
9	9	"Candace"	Martha Mitchell	Kelli Breslin & Michael Foley	November 4, 2018	0.47
Joe recalls Candace's cheating on him with Elijah, whom Joe subsequently impulsively pushes to his death from a building after confronting him. Meanwhile, since Joe will not talk to her about Candace, Beck begins her own investigation to learn what happened between them and why no one ever heard from Candace again. When her efforts lead to a dead end, Beck confronts Joe, who explains everything to Beck's satisfaction. Joe takes Beck to meet Mooney (who has had a stroke and is unable to communicate), Joe's father figure and the original owner of the bookstore. Joe discovers that Beck did have an affair with Dr. Nicky, which she finally admits before telling Joe she loves him. Clued in by something Paco says, Beck discovers Joe's hiding place in the bathroom ceiling. She is horrified as she finds her old cellphone as well as Benji's and Peach's, in addition to other disturbing mementos which he has kept. When Joe realizes what Beck has found, he knocks her out and locks her in the book vault.
10	10	"Bluebeard's Castle"	Marcos Siega	Sera Gamble & Neil Reynolds	November 11, 2018	0.53
Joe learns from Annika and Lynn that Peach's family have hired a private investigator to look into her death. Imprisonment prompts Beck to write about her own actions which have brought her to her current situation, and she suggests to Joe that he use Dr. Nicky as a scapegoat for his crimes. Ron's abuse puts Claudia in the hospital, and Joe kills him to protect Paco. Joe explains to Beck his reasoning for murdering Benji and Peach, and relates it to his childhood mental abuse at Mooney's hands. She appears to empathize with Joe and seems grateful for his actions. Beck lures Joe into the vault and manages to lock him in, revealing that it was all just an act to get him to open the door. Still trapped in the basement, she calls out to Paco, who leaves without calling the police in order to protect Joe. Joe escapes the vault and kills Beck. Four months later, Joe has used Beck's writing to frame Dr. Nicky for all of Joe's murders. Claudia and Paco move to California. Joe is stunned when Candace comes into the bookstore, telling him they have unfinished business.

== Production ==
Penn Badgley was cast as lead character Joe Goldberg in June 2017. Elizabeth Lail's casting as Guinevere Beck was announced in July 2017, as well as Luca Padovan as Joe's neighbor Paco, and Zach Cherry as Ethan, a bookstore clerk who works with Joe. Shay Mitchell was cast as Peach Salinger, Beck's wealthy best friend, in August 2017.

In September 2017, Hari Nef was cast in the recurring role as Blythe, a talented and competitive peer in Beck's MFA program. A few days later, it was announced that Daniel Cosgrove had been cast in the recurring role of Ron, a parole officer. In October 2017, Michael Maize and Ambyr Childers were cast in the recurring roles of Officer Nico and Candace, respectively. It was announced in November 2017 that John Stamos would recur as Dr. Nicky, Beck's therapist.

The first season of You was filmed in New York City and wrapped on December 19, 2017.

== Reception ==
=== Ratings ===
Viewership and ratings per episode of You season 1
No.	Title	Air date	Rating (18–49)	Viewers (millions)	DVR (18–49)	DVR viewers (millions)	Total (18–49)	Total viewers (millions)
1	"Pilot"	September 9, 2018	0.2	0.82	0.1	0.38	0.4	1.20
2	"The Last Nice Guy in New York"	September 16, 2018	0.2	0.77	0.2	0.43	0.4	1.20
3	"Maybe"	September 23, 2018	0.2	0.57	0.2	0.37	0.4	0.95
4	"The Captain"	September 30, 2018	0.2	0.56	0.1	0.38	0.3	0.94
5	"Living with the Enemy"	October 7, 2018	0.2	0.57	0.2	0.40	0.4	0.97
6	"Amour Fou"	October 14, 2018	0.3	0.71	0.2	0.37	0.4	1.08
7	"Everythingship"	October 21, 2018	0.2	0.62	0.2	0.37	0.3	1.00
8	"You Got Me, Babe"	October 28, 2018	0.1	0.49	0.2	0.40	0.3	0.89
9	"Candace"	November 4, 2018	0.1	0.47	0.2	0.35	0.3	0.82
10	"Bluebeard's Castle"	November 11, 2018	0.2	0.53	0.2	0.39	0.3	0.92

=== Critical response ===
The first season received positive reviews from critics. The review aggregator website Rotten Tomatoes, reports a 93% approval rating for the first season with an average rating of 6.97/10 based on 58 reviews. The website's critical consensus reads, "You pairs thrilling drama with trashy fun to create an addictive social media horror story that works its way under the skin – and stays there." Metacritic, which uses a weighted average, assigned the season a score of 74 out of 100 based on 29 critics, indicating "generally favorable" reviews.

Alicia Lutes of IGN gave the first season, a 8.4/10, stating that it is "so insane, you're bound to be riveted and engaged if nothing else" and that the series is "a horrifying love letter to all those romantic ideals and expectations that have permeated our society." Liz Miller from IndieWire gave the first season an "A−" grade, mentioning in a positive review, that it invokes "the best qualities of David Fincher's Gone Girl and Mary Harron's adaptation of American Psycho," and that the series "juxtaposes the idea of love as glamorized by the romance industrial complex with its dark side." Kylie Nixon from Stuff complimented the first season in her review by adding that the "show will mess with your head. You might feel super, super awkward a couple or fifty times, but by God, you'll be entertained."

Tiffany Kelly from Daily Dot recommended the first season in her review of the series by stating that it "quickly evolves into a disturbing profile of a psychopath in the digital age, one who uses social media to aid his stalking." While reviewing the first season, Anna Leszkiewicz from New Statesman declared in a positive review that "You does what it says on the tin – offering surprise twists, drip-fed reveals, a magnetic villain in Joe, the horrible suspense of knowing more than his clueless victims and satisfyingly gory murders." Christina Radish of Collider named Joe Goldberg as the "Best TV Villain" of 2018. Radish wrote that, "thanks to the performance given by Penn Badgley and some terrific writing, the character has layers that make him complicated and intriguing, even though you know he should be making you cringe and recoil. Joe Goldberg is a character that does horrible things, but also keeps you so engrossed that you can't stop watching."

=== Critics' year-end lists ===
2018
- No. 5 – TV Guide
- No. 6 – Associated Press
- No. 6 – The New York Times (new shows)
- No. 7 – People
- No. 8 – Entertainment Weekly
- No. 8 – Los Angeles Times
- — Glamour
- — Us Weekly
