= Hidden Bodies =

2016 thriller novel by Caroline Kepnes

- Author: Caroline Kepnes
- Language: English
- Series: You
- Genre: Thriller
- Published: February 23, 2016
- Publisher: Atria/Emily Bestler Books
- Publication place: United States
- Media type: Print (hardback and paperback); Audiobook; E-book
- Pages: 439 (hardcover)
- ISBN: 978-1-4767-8563-9

Hidden Bodies is a thriller novel by Caroline Kepnes, published in February 2016. It is the sequel to her 2014 novel, You. It was loosely adapted in the second season of the Netflix thriller series You.

Kepnes published the sequel, You Love Me in 2021.

== Synopsis ==
After murdering Guinevere Beck in You, Joe Goldberg is back in New York, trying to keep a low profile while running Mooney’s bookstore. He starts dating Amy Adam, a quirky book lover who seems perfect — until she robs the store of valuable books and vanishes to Los Angeles. Furious and betrayed, Joe follows her to Los Angeles, intent on revenge.

In L.A., Joe is quickly disgusted by the shallow, fame-obsessed lifestyle but stays focused on finding Amy. Along the way, he gets hired at a bookstore, blends into the Hollywood scene, and sets his sights on a new obsession: Love Quinn, a beautiful, rich, and emotionally intense woman who works at a fancy store and comes from a powerful family.

Joe quickly falls for Love and begins dating her, while still secretly looking for Amy. When he does find Amy, he’s shocked by how different she seems — and how uninterested she is in him. Instead of killing her, he decides she’s not worth it and lets her go. His obsession with Love fully takes over.

Meanwhile, Joe starts sleeping with his landlord, Delilah Alves, a sharp local reporter. She begins to get suspicious of Joe’s past and intentions. Eventually, Delilah discovers evidence of Joe’s crimes, and Joe kills her — brutally stabbing her in the bathtub. He covers it up and acts like nothing happened.

Joe also becomes entangled with Henderson, a famous comedian and predator. Joe goes to one of Henderson’s shows where Henderson mentions Amy in a crude joke, which makes Joe spiral. Paranoid and angry, Joe investigates Henderson and discovers his pattern of drugging and abusing underage girls. Believing he’s delivering justice, Joe murders Henderson by pushing him down the stairs in his own house.

Love’s twin brother, Forty Quinn, is a manic, drug-addicted aspiring screenwriter. Joe finds him annoying and unstable, but tolerates him to stay close to Love. At one point, Joe and Forty go on a wild drug-fueled trip to the desert. Joe poisons Forty with LSD, intending to kill him and make it look like an overdose. He believes he let Forty drown, but Forty survives.

Forty realizes what Joe did. Instead of turning him in, he uses it to blackmail Joe into ghostwriting his screenplay. Joe, trapped and frustrated, plays along while keeping his rage buried.

Eventually, Forty is hit by a car and dies — a tragic but convenient turn for Joe. However, Joe’s past finally catches up with him. After several missteps and increased scrutiny, Joe is arrested and put in prison by the end of the novel.

The book closes with Joe still obsessing over Love, convinced she’ll save him. He narrates from his prison cell, clinging to the hope that Love is pregnant with his child and will come back for him — showing that, even behind bars, his delusions and narcissism are fully intact.

== Reception ==
Anthony Breznican from Entertainment Weekly gave praise to the novel, stating that "as satire of a self-absorbed society, Kepnes hits the mark, cuts deep, and twists the knife".

== TV adaptation ==
In February 2015, it was announced that Greg Berlanti and Sera Gamble would develop a television series based on the novel at Showtime. Two years later, it was announced that the series was purchased by Lifetime and put on fast-track development. You premiered on September 9, 2018. On July 26, 2018, ahead of the series premiere, Lifetime announced that the series had been renewed for a second season. On December 3, 2018, it was confirmed that Lifetime had passed on a second season of the series, and that Netflix had picked it up. The second season, which premiered on December 26, 2019, adapted elements from Hidden Bodies.
