= Magda Apanowicz =

Canadian actress

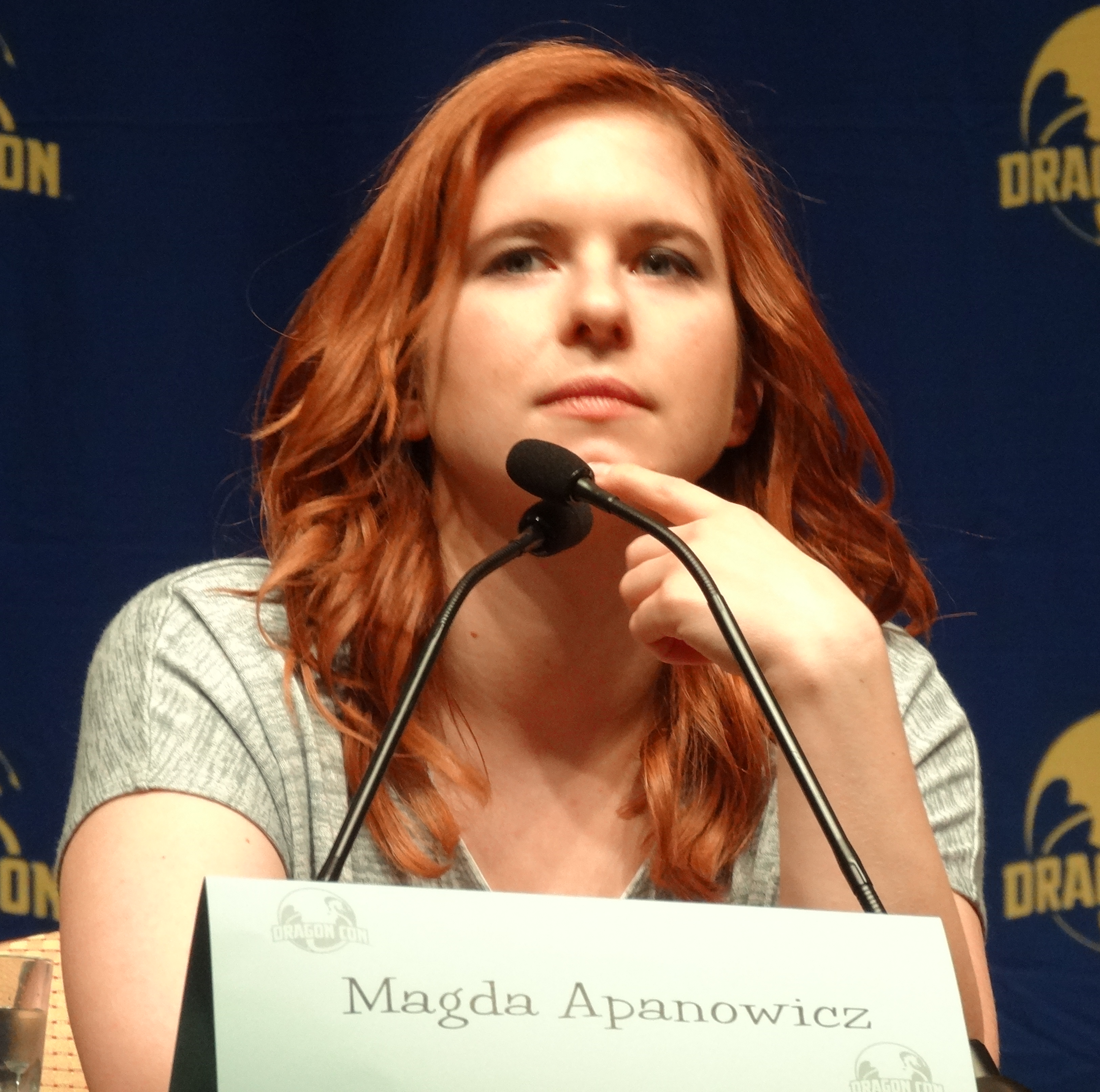
- Apanowicz in 2015
- Born: November 8, 1985 (age 40); Vancouver, British Columbia, Canada
- Occupation: Actress
- Years active: 2002–present

Magda Apanowicz (/æpəˈnoʊvɪtʃ/ ap-ə-NOH-vitch; Polish: [apaˈnɔvit͡ʂ]; born November 8, 1985) is a Canadian actress. She is known for her roles as Andy Jensen in the ABC Family series Kyle XY, as Lacy Rand in the Syfy science fiction drama series Caprica, and as Emily (born Maya Hartwell) in the science fiction series Continuum.

== Personal life ==
Apanowicz is of Polish descent and spent a year in Poland in the ninth grade. She lived there with her uncle and attended a school in Jelenia Góra. She later studied at Vancouver Film School.

== Career ==
She became interested in acting at the age of ten, after her brother introduced her to Pulp Fiction. She began her career in 2002 with brief appearances in the TV series Jeremiah and John Doe. From 2007 to 2009, she played the role of Andy Jensen on Kyle XY. In 2008 she starred in the Hallmark Channel original movie Every Second Counts.

In 2009, Apanowicz was cast as Lacy Rand, a series regular, in the television drama Caprica, with Eric Stoltz and Alessandra Torresani. She later appeared in Hellcats. In 2012, she guest starred in the second season of Jane Espenson's romantic comedy web series, Husbands.

In 2013, Apanowicz appeared as Emily aka Maya Hartwell in the series Continuum She also appeared in the Eli Roth horror film The Green Inferno as Samantha. Although it was filmed in 2012, The Green Inferno was internationally released in 2015.

In 2017, Apanowicz was cast as Angela in the science fiction thriller film Volition. It was released in 2020.

In 2019, Apanowicz was cast in the recurring role of Sandy on the second season of the Netflix thriller You.

== Filmography ==
Film
Year	Title	Role	Notes
2003	Sweet Lullaby	Julie	Short film
2004	Riverburn	Girl	Short film
2004	The Butterfly Effect	Teen Punk Girl	
2006	Slither	Friend (uncredited)	
2012	Dead Souls	Emma	
2014	A Reason	Serena Hilgrim	
2015	The Green Inferno	Samantha	
2019	Volition	Angela	

Television
Year	Title	Role	Notes
2002	Jeremiah	Young Girl	Episode: "And the Ground, Sown with Salt"
2002	John Doe	Pierced Model	Episode: "Low Art"
2004–05	Cold Squad	Kassia Harper	3 episodes
2006	The L Word	Redneck Girl	Episode: "Lost Weekend"
2006	Holiday Wishes	Dodie Bradley	Lifetime television film
2006–07	Renegadepress.com	Alex Young	Main role (seasons 3-5); 25 episodes
2007	Devil's Diary	Ursula Wilson	Lifetime television film
2007	Bionic Woman	Heaven Von Fleet	Episode: "Sisterhood"
2007–09	Kyle XY	Andy Jensen	Recurring role (seasons 2-3)
2008	The Andromeda Strain	Suzie Travis	Television miniseries, Episode: "1.1"
2008	Every Second Counts	Brooke Preston	Hallmark Channel television film
2009–10	Caprica	Lacy Rand	Main role
2010	Bond of Silence	Angie	Lifetime television film
2010	Team Unicorn	Zombie / Caroler	Episode: "A Very Zombie Holiday"
2010–11	Hellcats	Kathy	Recurring role
2011	Team Unicorn	Beach Babe	Episode: "Alien Beach Crashers"
2011	Snowmageddon	Jennifer Miller	Syfy television film
2011	Robot Chicken	Wife / Herman's Wife / Mother (voice)	Episode: "The Curious Case of the Box"
2012	Holliston	Goblin	Episode: "Weekend of Horrors"
2012	Husbands	TV Make Up Artist	Episodes: "Appropriate Is Not the Word", "The Straightening"
2012	The 12 Disasters of Christmas	Jacey	Syfy television film
2013	The Toyman Killer	Christine Solter	Lifetime television film
2013–15	Continuum	Emily / Maya Hartwell	Recurring role (seasons 2-4); 18 episodes
2014	The Mentalist	April Lark	Episode: "Black Hearts"
2014	Till Death Do Us Part	Jolene	Television film
2015	Fatal Memories	April Parker	Lifetime television film
2015	Motive	Elizabeth Hillis	Episode: "Reversal of Fortune"
2018	Travelers	Dawn	3 episodes
2018	Supernatural	Sandy	Episode: "The Thing"
2019	The Magicians	Woman in the Bar	2 episodes
2019	iZombie	Nora Shaw	Episode: "Dot Zom"
2019	Tempting Fate	Josephine	Lifetime television film
2019	You	Sandy Goldberg	Recurring role (season 2); Guest role (season 3)
2023	The Flash	Fiddler / Andrea Wozzeck	4 episodes

Additional appearances
Year	Title	Role	Notes
2011	I Don't Want to Die A Virgin by Young Beautiful in a Hurry	1950s Dancer	Music video
