= Riverburn =

- Directed by: Jennifer Calvert
- Written by: Thea Boyanowsky
- Produced by: Diane Carruthers Wood
- Starring: Magda Apanowicz
- Music by: Julie Blue
- Release date: 2004
- Country: Canada
- Language: English

Riverburn is a 2004 short film directed by Jennifer Calvert, that won her Best Young Canadian Director of a Short Film at the 2004 Vancouver International Film Festival.

The 20 minute film—inspired by Andrei Tarkovsky and Terrence Malick—is about a city girl (Magda Apanowicz) who while briefly left alone on a camping trip, meets a city boy, sparking a mutual interest.

Jason Whyte included the short in his Top 5 list for the Vancouver festival.

The short was shot in British Columbia in the summer of 2003.
