= Providence (Kepnes novel) =

2018 novel by Caroline Kepnes

First edition

Providence is Caroline Kepnes's third novel. It has been described as romance-suspense-thriller, with supernatural aspects. Reviewers have explicitly characterized it as "strange".

== Story ==
This book is a fictional story loosely of the Sci-fi genre. Loosely, because it is cryptic and doesn’t explain the scientific mechanisms that transform one of the main characters. In the book, a young woman finds herself caught in an emotionally & geographically distant relationship with her childhood sweetheart. A relationship in which she has zero control and is being strung along with just enough reinforcement to maintain concern, compassion, and hope for reuniting with this individual even though he is unable or unwilling to communicate the reason why they cannot be together.

Kepnes published the novel in 2018, four years after the publication of her dark first novel You. You was turned into a television and Netflix series, and her second novel was a sequel to it. Providence is unrelated to the first two novels.

=== Lenny Books ===
The novel was published by Lenny Books, an imprint of Random House that is directed by Lena Dunham and Jenni Konner.

== Reception ==
Alison Flood, in a review published by The Guardian, wrote "Providence is compelling, and Kepnes provides a sometimes piercing insight into the small, strange, sad details that make up a life, though without quite achieving the deep, dark pleasures of You." According to Cheryl Wassenaar, in a review in Cultures magazine, the novel is "a bit like Dexter meets, well, H.P. Lovecraft."

In an interview on a Providence, Rhode Island television station Kepnes noted that she set the novel in Providence because she was familiar with the area, having been a student there.
