= Ambyr Childers =

American actress

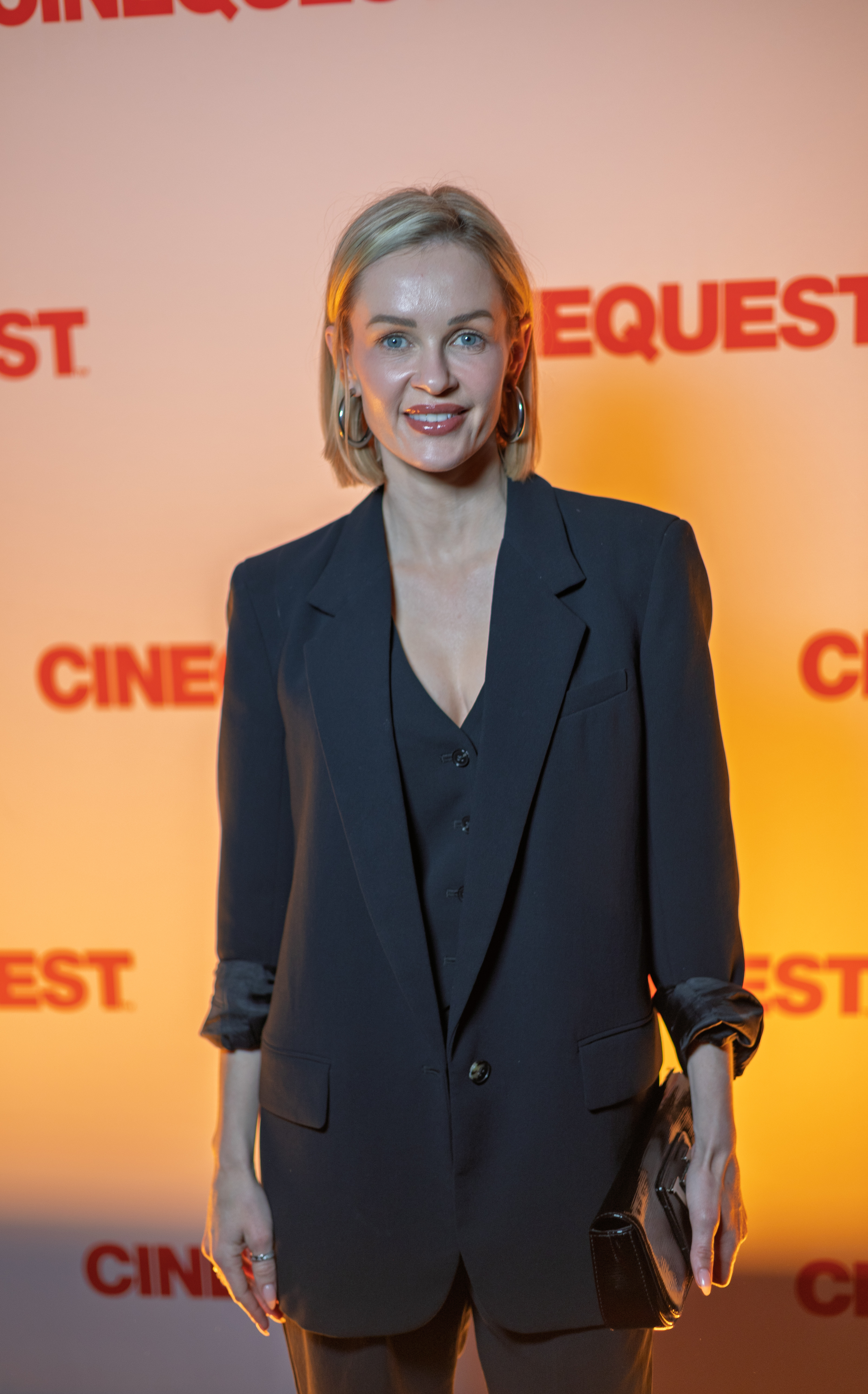
- Childers in 2026
- Occupation: Actress
- Years active: 2000–present
- Spouse: Randall Emmett (m. 2009; div. 2017)
- Children: 2

Ambyr Childers is an American actress known for her portrayal of Susan Atkins in the NBC crime drama Aquarius, Ashley Rucker in the Showtime crime drama Ray Donovan, and Candace Stone in the Netflix thriller series You.

== Career ==
After appearing in the 2003 film Dickie Roberts: Former Child Star, she played Colby Chandler on the daytime soap opera All My Children from 2006 to 2008. She played Elizabeth "E" Dodd in The Master.

Childers and Kate Bosworth co-created Ambyr Childers Jewelry.

Childers starred as Candace Stone in Lifetime's television adaptation of You, which premiered on September 9, 2018. On December 3, 2018, it was announced that You would move to Netflix as a "Netflix Original" title, ahead of the premiere of the second season. On February 1, 2019, Deadline announced that Childers had been promoted to a series regular role, ahead of the second season's premiere. The second season was released on December 26, 2019.

== Personal life ==
Childers married film producer Randall Emmett in 2009. The couple had a daughter in 2010 and a second daughter in 2013. Emmett filed for separation from Childers in April 2015, but dismissed the petition the following year. Childers filed for divorce in January 2017. It was finalized in December 2017.

== Filmography ==
=== Film ===
Year	Title	Role	Notes
2003	Carolina	Young Carolina	
2003	Dickie Roberts: Former Child Star	Barbie	
2011	Love	American Astronaut Woman	
2011	All Things Fall Apart	Sherry	Direct-to-video
2011	House of the Rising Sun	Cage girl	Direct-to-video
2011	Setup	Waitress Haley	Direct-to-video
2012	Lay the Favorite	Receptionist	
2012	Playback	Riley	In select theaters and video-on-demand
2012	Freelancers	Elaine Morrison	Direct-to-video
2012	The Master	Elizabeth Dodd	
2013	Gangster Squad	Milk-Skinned Blonde	
2013	Broken City	Mary	
2013	We Are What We Are	Iris Parker	
2013	2 Guns	Ms. Young	
2015	Vice	Kelly	In select theaters and video-on-demand
2017	A Moving Romance	Olivia Wilson	Television film
2017	Guardians of Oz	Eveline	Voice; American release and direct-to-video
2018	Pinocchio	Trixie the Fox	Voice; American release
2026	Born to Lose	Julie Logan	

=== Television ===
Year	Title	Role	Notes
2000	L.A. 7	Hiker #2	Episode: "Clever Camp"
2006–08	All My Children	Colby Chandler	Series regular (139 episodes)
2013–16	Ray Donovan	Ashley Rucker	Recurring role (9 episodes)
2014	Legends	Tara	Episode: "Rogue"
2015–16	Aquarius	Susan Atkins/Sadie	Recurring role (21 episodes)
2016	Criminal Minds: Beyond Borders	Natalie Knox	Episode: "The Ballad of Nick and Nat"
2018–19	You	Candace Stone	Recurring role (Season 1); Main cast (Season 2) (11 episodes)
2019	The Magicians	East River Dragon	Episode: "Home Improvement"
