= Victoria Pedretti =

American actress (born 1995)

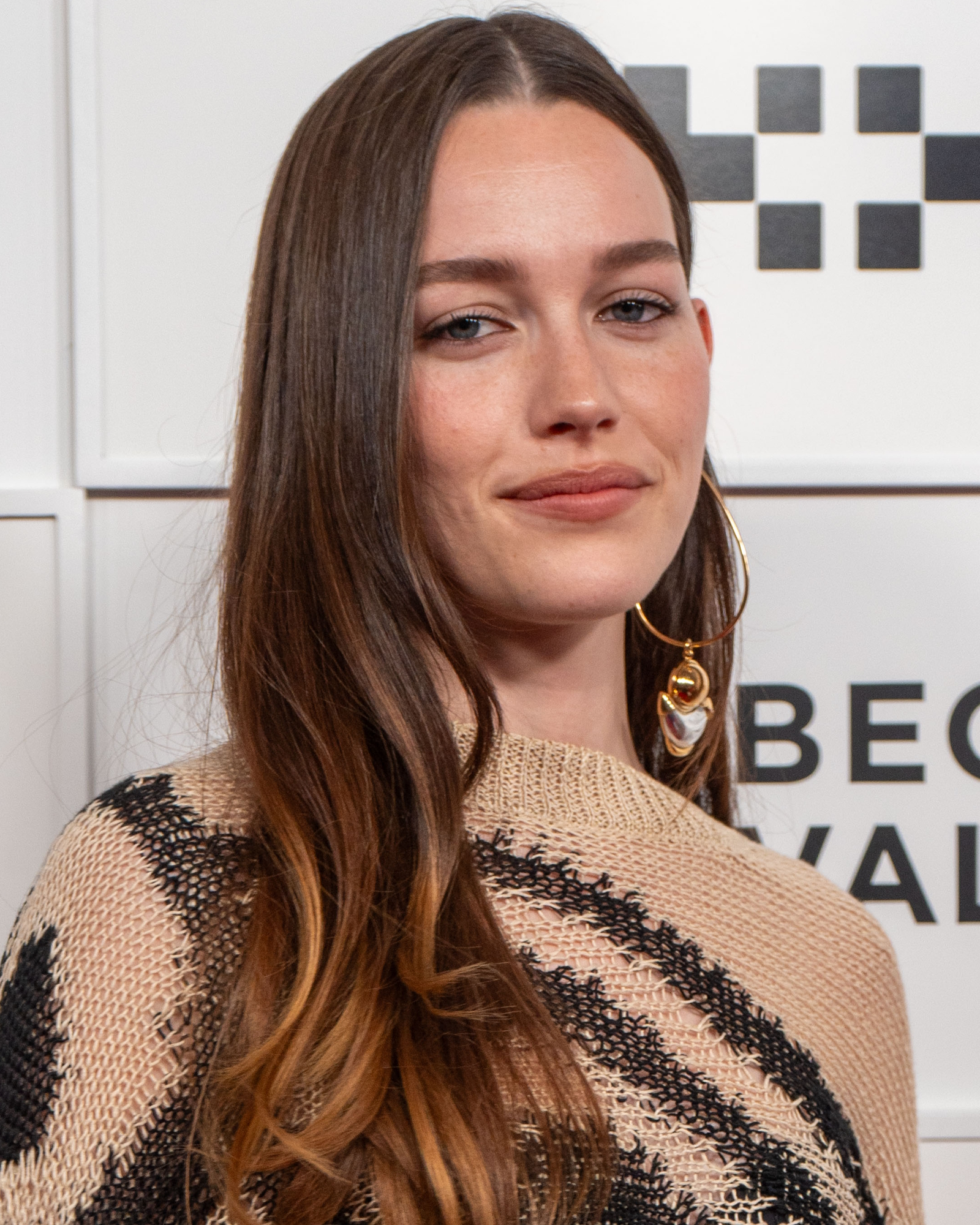
- Pedretti at Tribeca Festival in 2026
- Born: March 23, 1995 (age 31); Philadelphia, Pennsylvania, U.S.
- Occupation: Actress
- Years active: 2014–present
- Partner: Ethan Delorenzo (2025–present)

Victoria Pedretti (born March 23, 1995) is an American actress. She gained wide recognition for starring in the Netflix horror series The Haunting of Hill House (2018) and The Haunting of Bly Manor (2020), and in the Netflix thriller series You (2019–2021), emerging as a scream queen. For these roles, she received an MTV Award and nominations at the Critics' Choice and Saturn Awards.

Pedretti's films include the comedy drama Once Upon a Time in Hollywood (2019) as Leslie Van Houten, the biographical drama Origin (2023), the thriller Ponyboi (2024), and the comedy horror Forbidden Fruits (2026). On stage, she has appeared in a Broadway revival of An Enemy of the People (2024) and the play Tender Napalm (2024).

== Early life and education ==
Victoria Pedretti was born on March 23, 1995, in Philadelphia, Pennsylvania. She is of part Italian ancestry. She was raised Jewish, and had a bat mitzvah. She was diagnosed with ADHD when she was seven years old. She first expressed an interest in musical theatre while attending Pennsbury High School in Fairless Hills. She received her Bachelor of Fine Arts at the Carnegie Mellon School of Drama in Pittsburgh, where she said her professors advised her not to pursue acting.

== Career ==
=== 2014–2021: The Haunting anthology and You ===
Pedretti began acting in 2014, appearing in the short films Sole as the female protagonist and Uncovering Eden as Edie. Her breakthrough came with playing Eleanor "Nell" Crain in Mike Flanagan's Netflix supernatural horror series The Haunting of Hill House, released in 2018 to critical acclaim. Reviewers at Dread Central and The Guardian called Pedretti's performance "scene-stealing" and the "soul" of the show, and MovieWeb said it added "a horrifying realism to the character, and viewers can feel all of Nell's pain and anguish to the very end. This is one of the defining roles for Victoria Pedretti, and she's only getting started." She received nominations for the Saturn Award for Best Supporting Actress on Television and the MTV Movie Award for Most Frightened Performance.

Pedretti was next cast as Love Quinn in the Netflix thriller series You, having previously auditioned for the role of Guinevere Beck. She starred in season two and three, which were released in 2019 and 2021, respectively, to critical acclaim. While filming during the COVID-19 pandemic, the intimate scenes posed a challenge for Pedretti to film as "it took months to figure out how to do it safely. [...] We played a couple before, but it didn't just immediately come back after being in a global pandemic." For season two, writers at Elle said Pedretti "delivered the perfect amount of spook and smolder to keep us on the edge of our seats for all ten episodes." She was nominated for the MTV Movie Award for Best Villain. Also in 2019, she played Leslie Van Houten in Quentin Tarantino's comedy-drama film Once Upon a Time in Hollywood, her first role in both a feature film and a blockbuster film.

Pedretti next played Evelyn Porter in the 2020 pilot episode of the anthology series Amazing Stories. She also appeared in the short film This is Not a Love Letter and played Katherine in the biographical-drama film Shirley. A follow-up series to The Haunting of Hill House, The Haunting of Bly Manor, was released in 2020 and saw Pedretti leading the show as Danielle "Dani" Clayton. Journalists at The Hollywood Reporter and Screen Rant greatly praised her acting, deeming it "star-making", "appealing" and "heavy lifting". Angelica Jade Bastién of Vulture even called Pedretti "one of the most exciting young actors to watch". She won the MTV Movie Award for Most Frightened Performance and was nominated for the Critics' Choice Super Award for Best Actress in a Horror Series.

In 2021, Pedretti appeared in singer-songwriter Kacey Musgraves' Star-Crossed: The Film, a companion feature to Musgraves' album of the same name, in a cameo role as a woman participating in a heist. A clip from the film featuring Pedretti later served as the music video for Musgraves' song "Simple Times". Also in 2021, she was announced to star in the film Lucky, based on the memoir of the same name, in which she would be portraying writer Alice Sebold during her freshman year at Syracuse University. However, the film was cancelled after losing its financing.

=== 2022–present: Film focus and Broadway debut ===
Pedretti was announced in 2022 to be headlining the Hulu original series Saint X, but she reportedly left the series due to creative differences, with Alycia Debnam-Carey replacing her in the lead role. The following year, she played Irma Eckler in Ava DuVernay's acclaimed biographical drama film Origin. She also reprised the role of Love Quinn in the fourth season of You as a cameo appearance in 2023.

In 2024, Pedretti starred as Angel in the thriller-drama film Ponyboi, which was described as the "queer breakout" of that year's Sundance Film Festival. On accepting the role, Pedretti said that "I think the most important films to be made are the ones that deal with subject matters that people aren't well-versed in and with characters they haven't seen before. This was an incredible opportunity for that to happen." She also headlined the short films Fall Risk and Merci, Poppy, and the film Everything to Me. Also in 2024, she made her Broadway debut in the Sam Gold directed adaptation of the Henrik Ibsen play, An Enemy of the People, at the Circle in the Square Theatre. Gold said of her casting that "She worked really hard in auditions and won the part for proving herself a really strong state actor who could take direction and take [it] all on her shoulders..." Greg Evans of Deadline Hollywood believed Pedretti "is ready-made for her strong-willed, occasionally fretful, role". She next starred in an Off-Broadway production of the Philip Ridley play Tender Napalm.

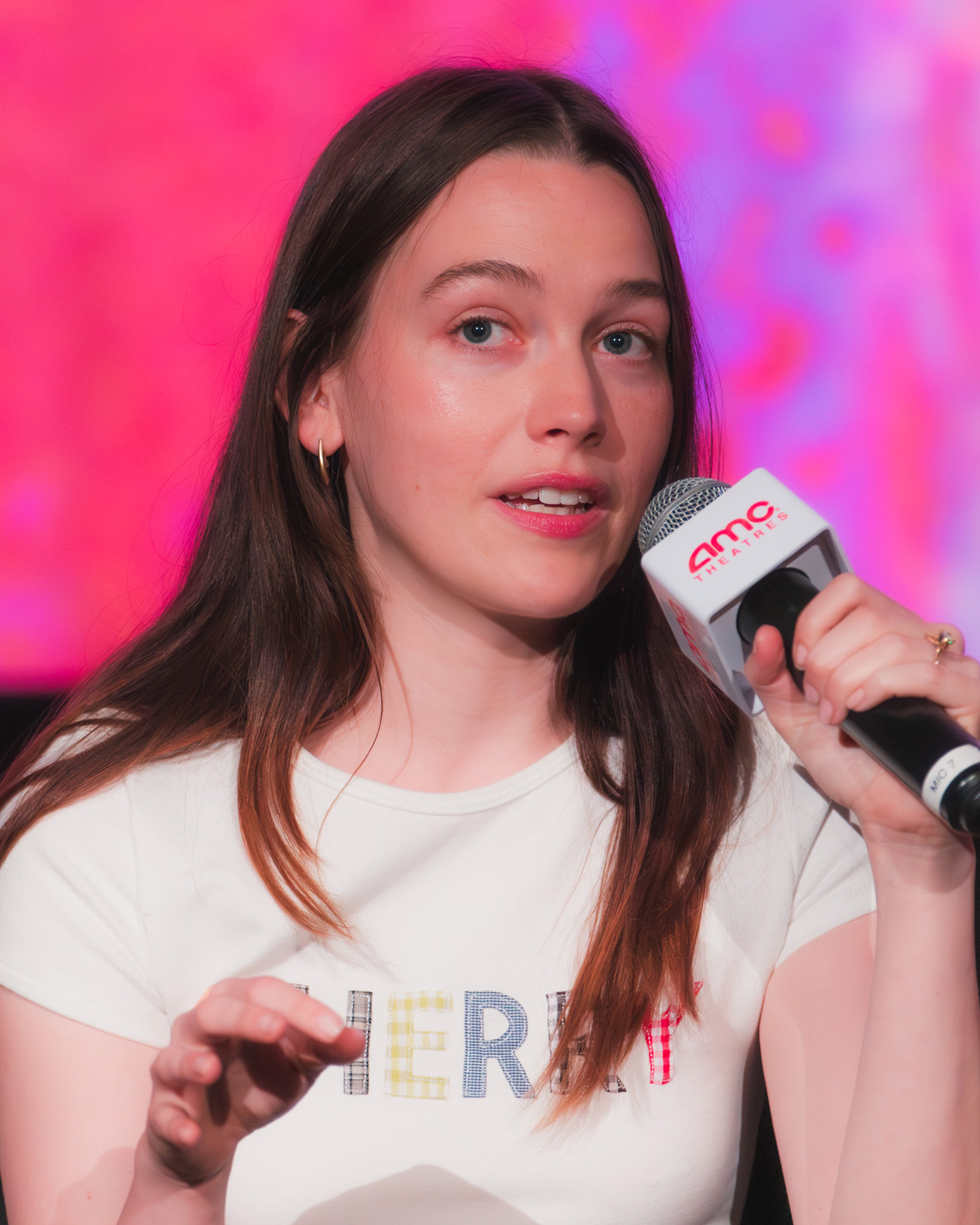
Pedretti promoting Forbidden Fruits in 2026

Pedretti's first release of 2026 was the comedy horror film Forbidden Fruits, in which she plays Cherry, the "earnest heart" of a cult. A writer from the Los Angeles Times believed the role expanded her scream queen status, and her performance earned additional praise from writers at The New York Times and The A.V. Club; Chris Azzopardi commended her dedication, and Jacob Oller thought she was "particularly hilarious as the horny airhead blonde, with fantastic timing and a squeaky-silly delivery that never gets old." She next made a surprise guest appearance in an episode of Something Very Bad Is Going to Happen. Her next role was in Rachel Rose's drama film The Last Day, inspired by Virginia Woolf's 1925 novel Mrs Dalloway. It premiered at the Tribeca Festival in June 2026 to positive reviews, with Pedretti's performance being coined by The Hollywood Reporter as her "biggest film role to date" and Variety as "at once raw-nerved and a million miles away".

Upcoming projects

Pedretti will star in If She Burns, written and directed by Alex Wolff, and The Non-Actor, written and directed by Eliza Callahan.

== Artistry ==
Pedretti has said her experience with The Haunting of Hill House made her comfortable with playing darker roles in the horror and thriller genres, and that she has "got a knack for" them. Laura Studarus of Shondaland says that Pedretti "carved out a niche in the horror and suspense genre" and also opined that she can be versatile. For her performance in The Haunting of Bly Manor, she cites Timothée Chalamet's acting in the film Call Me by Your Name (2017) as an inspiration.

After her Broadway debut in 2024, Pedretti expressed an interest in continuing stage work, telling Interview that "doing theater, it's very ideal. I'd love to keep doing this."

== Personal life ==
Pedretti resides in New York as of 2024. She briefly dated her You co-star Dylan Arnold in 2021, and actor Fred Hechinger in 2024. In July 2025, she announced her engagement to photographer Ethan Delorenzo.

== Filmography ==
Key
| † | Denotes films that have not yet been released |

=== Film ===
| Year | Title | Role | Notes | Ref. |
|---|---|---|---|---|
| 2014 | Sole | Girl | Short film | |
| 2014 | Uncovering Eden | Edie | Short film | |
| 2019 | Once Upon a Time in Hollywood | Leslie Van Houten | | |
| 2020 | This is Not a Love Letter | Girl | Short film | |
| 2020 | Shirley | Katherine | | |
| 2021 | Star-Crossed: The Film | Heist Girl | | |
| 2023 | Origin | Irma Eckler | | |
| 2024 | Ponyboi | Angel | | |
| 2024 | Everything to Me | Adult Claudia | | |
| 2024 | Fall Risk | Dylan | Short film | |
| 2024 | Merci, Poppy | Poppy | Short film | |
| 2026 | Forbidden Fruits | Cherry | | |
| 2026 | The Last Day | Taylor | Post-production | |
| 2026 | The Non-Actor | Elliot | Short film | |

=== Television ===
| Year | Title | Role | Notes | Ref. |
|---|---|---|---|---|
| 2018 | The Haunting of Hill House | Adult Eleanor "Nell" Crain | Main role | |
| 2019–2021, 2023 | You | Love Quinn | Main role (season 2–3); episode: "She's Not There" | |
| 2020 | Amazing Stories | Evelyn Porter | Episode: "The Cellar" | |
| 2020 | The Haunting of Bly Manor | Danielle "Dani" Clayton | Lead role | |
| 2023 | Chris Fleming: Hell | Herself / additional characters | Comedy special on Peacock | |
| 2026 | Something Very Bad Is Going to Happen | Alexandra Harkin / Larry Poole Survivor | Episode: "The Witness" | |

=== Stage ===
| Year | Production | Role | Theater | Ref. |
|---|---|---|---|---|
| 2024 | An Enemy of the People | Petra Stockmann | Circle in the Square Theatre | |
| 2024 | Tender Napalm | Woman | Theaterlab | |

=== Audio ===
| Year | Title | Role | Notes |
|---|---|---|---|
| 2023 | Compromised | Agent Andie Jones | Main role |

=== Music videos ===
- "Simple Times" (2021) – Kacey Musgraves

== Awards and nominations ==
| Award | Year (Note: Indicates the year of ceremony. Each year is linked to the article about the awards held that year, wherever possible.) | Category | Work | Result | Ref. |
|---|---|---|---|---|---|
| Critics' Choice Super Awards | 2021 | Best Actress in a Horror Series | The Haunting of Bly Manor | Nominated | |
| Hollywood Critics Association Awards | 2022 | Best Actress in a Streaming Series, Drama | You | Nominated | |
| MTV Movie & TV Awards | 2019 | Most Frightened Performance | The Haunting of Hill House | Nominated | |
| MTV Movie & TV Awards | 2021 | Most Frightened Performance | The Haunting of Bly Manor | Won | |
| MTV Movie & TV Awards | 2022 | Best Villain | You | Nominated | |
| Saturn Awards | 2019 | Best Supporting Actress on Television | The Haunting of Hill House | Nominated | |
