= You Love Me (novel) =

2021 thriller novel by Caroline Kepnes

- Author: Caroline Kepnes
- Language: English
- Genre: Thriller
- Published: April 6, 2021
- Publisher: Random House
- Publication place: United States
- Media type: Print (hardback and paperback); Audiobook; E-book
- Pages: 400 (hardcover)
- ISBN: 978-0-593-13378-1
- Preceded by: Hidden Bodies (2016)
- Followed by: For You and Only You (2023)

You Love Me is a thriller novel by Caroline Kepnes, published in April 2021. It is the sequel to her 2016 novel, Hidden Bodies, and third installment of the You series.

The novel debuted at number fifteen on The New York Times fiction best-seller list for the week ending April 10, 2021.

Kepnes published another sequel, For You and Only You, in 2023.

== Synopsis ==
After serving time in jail, Joe is released and paid off by the wealthy Quinn family to stay away from Love and their baby. Taking the money, Joe leaves Los Angeles and relocates to the quiet Bainbridge Island in Washington State, determined to live a better, less violent life and prove he can love someone the “right” way.

He starts working at the local library, where he meets Mary Kay DiMarco, a well-liked librarian with a teenage daughter, Nomi. Joe becomes obsessed with Mary Kay but convinces himself he will win her over by being honest, patient, and good. However, when he learns she is still married to her ex-rockstar husband Phil, Joe subtly manipulates the situation. He befriends Phil under a fake identity, encourages him to relapse into addiction, and ultimately helps push Mary Kay toward divorcing him. Phil later dies of an overdose.

Joe and Mary Kay begin a romantic relationship and move in together. For a time, Joe feels genuinely happy and in control. However, complications arise when Love unexpectedly shows up, confronting Joe and ultimately shooting him. Joe survives, but Love dies in the encounter.

Back in Bainbridge, Joe’s life spirals again. Seamus, a man obsessed with Nomi, kidnaps Joe out of jealousy. Joe is rescued by a private investigator hired by Love’s family, who kills Seamus in the process. Mary Kay and Joe get married in a small, symbolic backyard ceremony.

However, things fall apart once more when Nomi, confused and angry, pushes Mary Kay down the stairs during an argument. Mary Kay ends up in a coma. In the aftermath, Joe moves to Florida and opens a bar/bookstore. The novel ends with Joe meeting a mysterious woman, hinting at the beginning of another obsession.

== Reception ==
Sarah Weinman from The New York Times gave a glowing review of the novel, stating that it "continues to work because Kepnes is brilliant at depicting the cognitive dissonance of someone like Joe. His stalkerish behavior steps over the line again and again, but in a way that is all too familiar to any woman menaced or made uncomfortable by the so-called "good guy." No doubt he'll return in future installments, demonstrating the shattered barrier between id and superego."

== Sequels ==
Kepnes published a third sequel, For You and Only You, in 2023.
