= You (Kepnes novel) =

2014 thriller novel by Caroline Kepnes

- Cover of You
- Author: Caroline Kepnes
- Language: English
- Genre: Thriller
- Published: September 30, 2014
- Publisher: Atria/Emily Bestler Books
- Publication place: United States
- Media type: Print (hardback and paperback); Audiobook; E-book
- Pages: 424 (hardcover)
- ISBN: 978-1-4767-8559-2

You is a thriller novel written by American author Caroline Kepnes, published in September 2014. The novel has been translated into 19 languages, and was adapted in the first season of the television series of the same name.

Kepnes has published 3 sequels: Hidden Bodies in 2016, You Love Me in 2021, and For You and Only You in 2023. A prequel, You First, was published in 2026.

== Plot ==
Joe Goldberg, a bookstore manager in New York City, meets Guinevere Beck ("Beck"), an aspiring writer, when she visits his shop. Instantly infatuated, Joe becomes convinced that they are destined to be together. After their brief encounter, he uses her credit card information from the purchase to find her name and online profiles. Joe begins stalking Beck both digitally and physically, learning intimate details about her life, friends, and habits.

Believing Beck needs him, Joe intervenes secretly in her life. He orchestrates "accidents" to remove perceived obstacles to their relationship. Joe steals Beck's phone, gaining even deeper access to her communications, and manipulates situations to insert himself into her life naturally. They eventually begin a romantic relationship, though Beck remains unaware of Joe's stalking.

Joe views Beck's wealthy, pretentious boyfriend, Benji, as an impediment. Luring Benji into the bookstore's basement cage under the guise of a business opportunity, Joe imprisons and later kills him, staging the death as an overdose. With Benji out of the way, Joe's relationship with Beck intensifies. However, he grows increasingly jealous and suspicious of her close friend, Peach Salinger.

Peach, who harbors her own obsession with Beck, becomes suspicious of Joe. After several confrontations, Joe kills Peach during a staged home invasion while she and Beck are at Peach's family estate in Little Compton. Peach's death is ruled a suicide, further removing obstacles to Joe's control over Beck's life.

Despite Joe's efforts, Beck continues to pursue other relationships and hides aspects of her life. Their relationship deteriorates, culminating when Beck discovers Joe's stalker behavior and learns the truth about Benji and Peach. Joe locks Beck in the bookstore's soundproof glass cage, rationalizing it as necessary for their love. Beck initially attempts to manipulate Joe into releasing her, but after attempting to escape, she is killed by him.

Joe fabricates a story framing Dr. Nicky, Beck's therapist (with whom Beck had an affair), for her death. Beck's final writings are staged to support this narrative. Joe escapes suspicion, and the novel ends with Joe preparing to pursue a new woman who enters the bookstore, implying that his cycle of obsession will continue.

== Reception ==
Jennifer Selway of the Daily Express described the suspense of the narrative: "What you don't know, and this clever, chilling, teasing tale keeps you hanging on by your fingertips, is exactly what sort of bad ending is coming up." Emma Oulton from Bustle praised the novel, stating that it "is one of the most unsettling books I've read this year, but despite being thoroughly creeped out, I couldn't put it down even for a second."

== TV adaptation ==
In February 2015, it was announced that Greg Berlanti and Sera Gamble would develop a television series based on the novel at Showtime. Two years later, it was announced that the series was purchased by Lifetime and put on fast-track development. You premiered on September 9, 2018.
