= Caroline Kepnes =

American writer (born 1976)

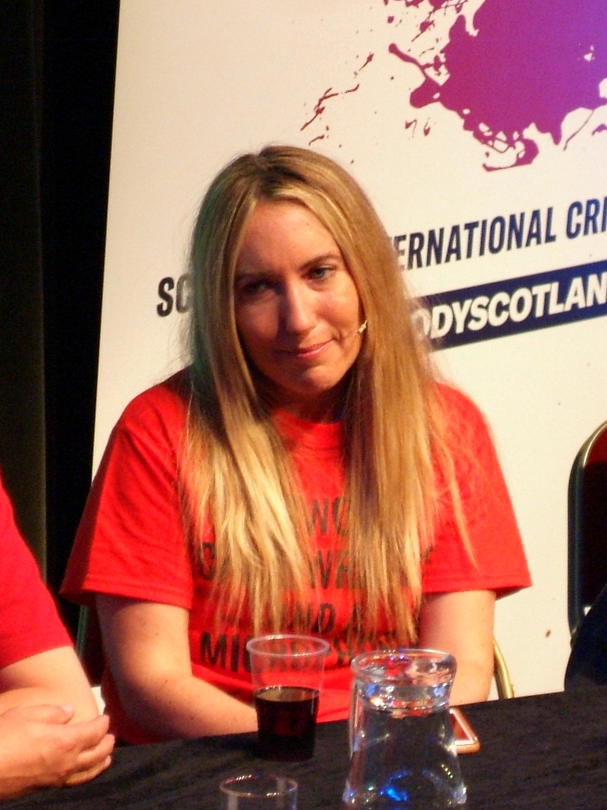
- Caroline Kepnes at Bloody Scotland, 2019
- Born: November 10, 1976 (age 50); Centerville, Massachusetts, U.S.
- Education: Brown University
- Occupations: Writer; screenwriter; entertainment reporter
- Known for: You series: You novel (2014); Hidden Bodies (2016); You TV series (2018–2025); You Love Me (2021); For You and Only You (2023); Other novels: Providence (2018)
- Website: carolinekepnes.com

Caroline Kepnes (born November 10, 1976) is an American writer, screenwriter, author, and former entertainment reporter. She is best known for her novel series You, consisting of You (2014), Hidden Bodies (2016), You Love Me (2021), and For You and Only You (2023), writing for the 2018–2025 Lifetime/Netflix television series adaptation of the same name, and the stand-alone novel Providence (2018).

== Career ==
Kepnes was born November 1976 on Cape Cod, Massachusetts. Her father was Jewish and Kepnes identifies as "half-Jewish." During her formative years, she attended Barnstable High School. After graduation, she commenced her studies at Brown University. Later, she obtained an undergraduate degree in American Civilization and worked as an entertainment reporter for Entertainment Weekly.

In an interview with the Boston Globe Kepnes said her first paid writing gig was an article on boy bands, for Tiger Beat magazine. In addition to her work as a writer, she performed as a background character in the television series The $treet.

In 2014 Kepnes released her first novel of the thriller series, You. Kepnes explained the darkness of You, which deconstructs the romantic-comedy tropes highlighted in many films and shows by making the protagonist a violent stalker and serial killer, saying it was written in a dark period of her life, the year her father died of cancer, and in which she experienced several other personal challenges. Later, Kepnes was initially hesitant on labeling Joe, as a few readers argued that his actions classified him as a serial killer. The author then clarified her position on the matter, citing that "I remember when I wrote You and someone first referred to Joe as a serial killer. I argued 'he’s not a serial killer, he meets these terrible people and has these awful thoughts, but he’s very sensitive'. It’s very strange to realise you have written a serial killer."

In February 2015, it was announced that Greg Berlanti and Sera Gamble would develop a television series based on the novel at Showtime. Two years later, it was announced that the series was purchased by Lifetime and put on fast-track development. You premiered on September 9, 2018. On July 26, 2018, ahead of the series premiere, Lifetime announced that the series had been renewed for a second season. On December 3, 2018, it was confirmed that Lifetime had passed on a second season and that Netflix had picked up the series. The second season was released exclusively on Netflix on December 26, 2019. On January 14, 2020, You was renewed for a third season by Netflix. The third season was released on October 15, 2021. In October 2021, ahead of the third season premiere, the series was renewed for a fourth season.

In 2016, Kepnes published a sequel to You, Hidden Bodies. It was loosely adapted in the second season of the Netflix thriller series, You. For Hidden Bodies, Kepnes had thoughts for a potential direction before its conception, stating “ Before I was even finished with the first book I knew what my second one was going to be. I wanted to trap Joe somewhere. "

Her third novel, Providence, published in 2018, has been described as romance-suspense-thriller, with supernatural aspects. Alison Flood, in a review published by The Guardian, wrote "Providence is compelling, and Kepnes provides a sometimes piercing insight into the small, strange, sad details that make up a life, though without quite achieving the deep, dark pleasures of You." According to Cheryl Wassenaar, in a review in Cultures magazine, the novel is "a bit like Dexter meets, well, H.P. Lovecraft." In January 2021, it was announced that Greg Berlanti and Sera Gamble would reunite to develop a television series based on the novel for Peacock.

The third novel and the sequel to Hidden Bodies, titled You Love Me was released on April 6, 2021. Kepnes published the fourth novel for the You series, titled For You and Only You: A Joe Goldberg Novel released on April 25, 2023.

== Bibliography ==
=== You series ===
- You (2014)
- Hidden Bodies (2016)
- You Love Me (2021)
- For You and Only You (2023)
- You First: A Joe Goldberg Prequel (2026)

=== Stand-alone works ===
- Stephen Crane (2014)
- Providence: A Novel (2018)

== Other works ==
=== Television ===
- You (2018–2025, writer)
  - 1.08 – "You Got Me, Babe" (written by) (October 28, 2018)
- The Secret Life of the American Teenager (staff writer - 3 episodes, 2008 - 2009)
  - Born Free (written by) July 20, 2009
  - Money for Nothing, Chicks for Free (written by) February 23, 2009
  - Just Say No (written by) September 9, 2008
- 7th Heaven (staff writer - 2 episodes, 2006–2007)
  - Script Number Two Hundred Thirty-Four (written by) January 21, 2007
  - Turn, Turn, Turn (written by) September 25, 2006
