= Sera Gamble =

American television writer and producer (born 1983)

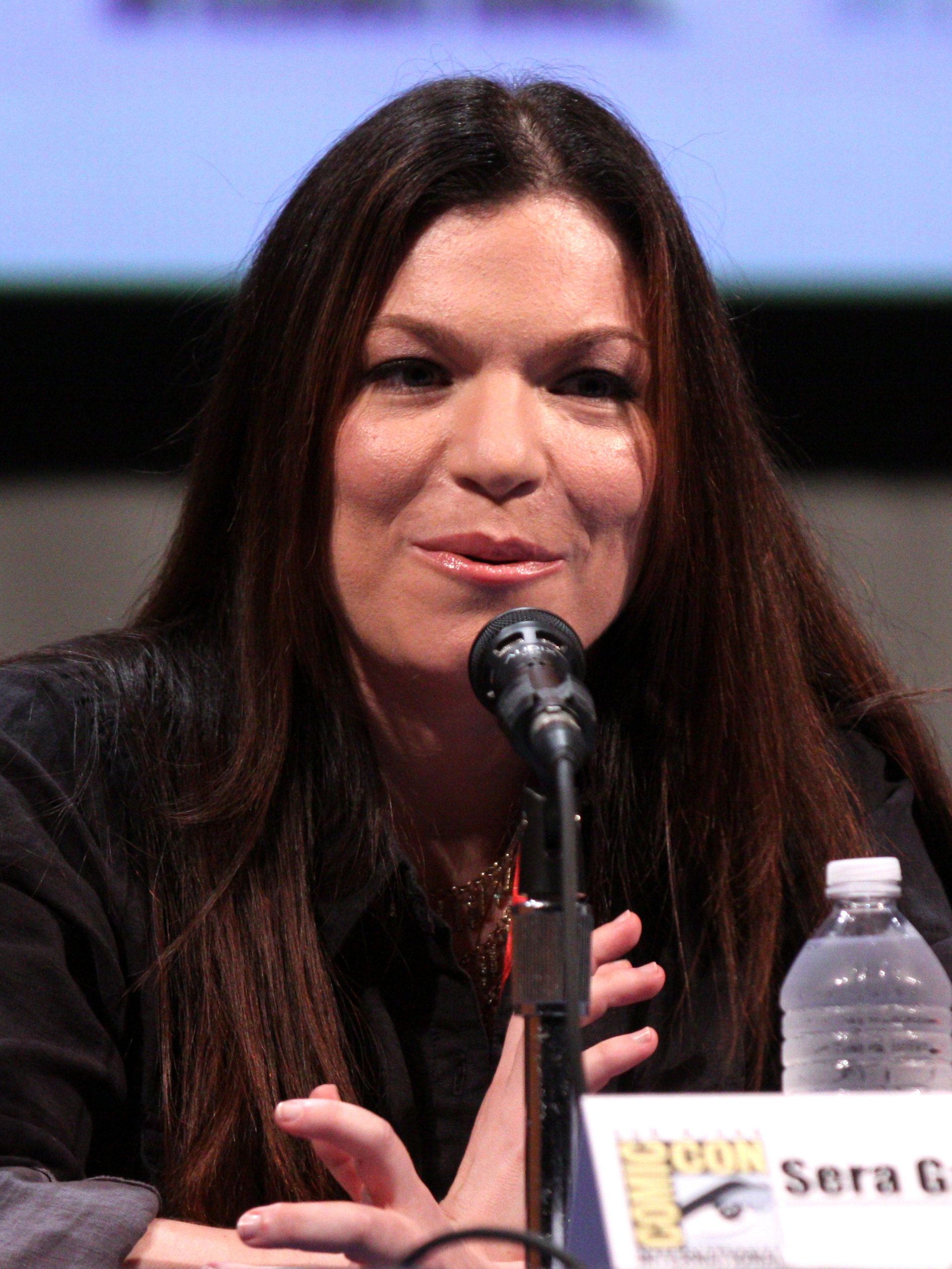
- Gamble in 2011
- Born: New York City
- Education: Redlands High School, Redlands, California
- Occupations: Television writer, producer
- Notable work: You, Supernatural and The Magicians

Sera Gamble is an American television writer and producer, best known for her work on Lifetime/Netflix's You, Syfy's The Magicians and The CW's Supernatural.

== Early life ==
Born in New York City, Gamble was briefly raised in Cincinnati before moving to Redlands, California. She graduated from the UCLA School of Theater, Film and Television.

== Career ==
Before turning to film and television, Gamble starred in stage productions of Will Strip for Food in Los Angeles and Dublin, Ireland. She produced and starred in a stage production of Eve of Paradise, written and directed by Raelle Tucker. She also starred in a short film written and directed by Tucker, entitled The Clay Man; the film was based on a short story by Gamble.

Gamble has published several works of literary short fiction, including stories published by the journal Washington Square, on nerve.com, and anthologized in the 2006 and 2007 editions of The Best American Erotica and the "dark, gothic" collection Bitten.

=== Television ===
Gamble's career in Hollywood began when she appeared as a finalist on the second season of Project Greenlight in 2003. She was hired as a writer on the short-lived ABC series Eyes.

Following that series' cancellation, she was hired as a writer and story editor on the CW series Supernatural. Gamble was part of the writing team on Supernatural for its first seven seasons. She contributed some thirty scripts for the series and was made an executive producer in season five. At the end of the fifth season, creator Eric Kripke stepped down as head writer of the series and Gamble was chosen as his successor. She served as the series' showrunner beginning with the sixth season, and ending with the end of the seventh season.

Gamble chose to step down from her post as showrunner and executive producer on Supernatural at the end of the seventh season in order to "focus on developing other material" for Warner Bros. Television, including pilots for ABC and The CW television networks. She was replaced by Being Human executive producer Jeremy Carver, who worked on Supernatural from seasons 3 to 5.

Gamble worked as a writer and executive producer for two seasons of the NBC period drama Aquarius. She appears in a cameo role in episode 7 of season one. While working together on Aquarius, she and John McNamara co-created and executive produced the television adaptation of Lev Grossman's New York Times bestselling novel The Magicians for the Syfy network. With McNamara, she serves as the series' showrunner. The Magicians was renewed for a second season in 2016, a third season in 2017, a fourth season in 2018 and a fifth season that premiered on January 15, 2020. In March 2020, Syfy announced that the fifth season would be the series' final season.

While working together on Aquarius, Gamble, John McNamara and Alexandra Cunningham formed the production company, Fabrication. Fabrication's current development slate includes adaptations of The Lizard Kings and The Persuaders.

Gamble and Greg Berlanti co-created and executive produce the television adaptation of Caroline Kepnes's bestselling novel You. Gamble was the primary showrunner of the series. You was initially renewed for a second season by Lifetime before the first season aired. The first season of You began airing on Lifetime in September 2018, garnering positive reviews from the New York Times, New Yorker, and Los Angeles Times. On December 3, 2018, it was announced that the series would move to Netflix as a "Netflix Original" title, ahead of the premiere of the second season, after Lifetime reneged on the renewal deal. The second season was released exclusively on Netflix on December 26, 2019. On January 14, 2020, You was renewed for a third season by Netflix. The third season was released on October 15, 2021. In October 2021, ahead of the third-season premiere, the series was renewed for a fourth season.

In January 2021, it was announced that Gamble and Berlanti would reunite to develop a television series based on the novel Providence by Kepnes for Peacock.

== Personal life ==
Gamble is Jewish, and formerly co-blogged "Very Hot Jews" with Simon Glickman.

Gamble is married to Eric Weiss. Their wedding took place in September 2019. Currently, they reside in Los Angeles, California.

== Filmography ==
=== Film ===
Title	Year	Credited as	Notes
Title	Year	Writer	Notes
The Clay Man	2004	Story	
Who's Wagging Who?	2008	Yes	

=== Television ===
The numbers in writing credits refer to the number of episodes.

Key
†	Denotes television programs that have not yet aired.

Title	Year	Credited as			Network	Notes
Title	Year	Creator	Writer	Executive Producer	Network	Notes
Eyes	2005	No	Yes (2)	No	ABC	
Supernatural	2005–12	No	Yes (29)	Yes	The WB; The CW	Story editor (season 1), executive story editor (season 2), producer (season 3), supervising producer (season 4), executive producer (season 5–7)
Company Town	2013	Yes	Yes	Yes	The CW	Unsold pilot
Aquarius	2015–16	No	Yes (5)	Yes	NBC	
The Magicians	2015–20	Yes	Yes (15)	Yes	Syfy	
You	2018–25	Developer	Yes (7)	Yes	Lifetime; Netflix	
Physical	2021	No	No	Yes	Apple TV+	
Providence †	TBA		Yes	Yes	Peacock	
