= Grown Ups (2027 TV series) =

Irish television series

- Genre: Drama
- Based on: Grown Ups by Marian Keyes
- Written by: Samantha Strauss
- Starring: Adrian Dunbar; Aisling Bea; Sarah Greene; Robert Sheehan
- Country of origin: Ireland
- Original language: English

Production
- Executive producers: Samantha Strauss; Louise Gough; Marian Keyes; Liz Watts; Helen Gregory; Emile Sherman; Iain Canning
- Production companies: Picking Scabs; See-Saw Films

Original release
- Network: Netflix

Grown Ups is an upcoming drama television series for Netflix. It is an adaptation by Samantha Strauss of the Marian Keyes novel of the same name. The cast is led by Adrian Dunbar, Robert Sheehan, Sarah Greene, and Aisling Bea. The series will premiere on 14 January 2027.

== Premise ==
"Based on three couples—Nell and Liam, Cara and Ed, Jessie and Rory—like most families, the Caseys are a complicated bunch," the show's synopsis states. "Ever-shifting politics. Old and new resentments. Arguments that blow over quickly and hurts that are nursed forever. They're loyal. Noisy. And bound together by a whole lot of love."

== Cast ==
- Adrian Dunbar as Canice
- Aisling Bea as Cara
- Sarah Greene as Jessie
- Robert Sheehan as Liam
- Sinead Cusack as Rose
- Amy-Leigh Hickman as Nell
- Barry Ward as Johnnie
- Karin Hanczewski as Ed
- James Agnew as Ferdia
- Katelyn Rose Downey as Saoirse

== Production ==
See-Saw Films are producing the series for Netflix. Samantha Strauss is adapting the Marian Keyes novel on which it is based, and is executive producer on the drama. Liz Watts, Helen Gregory, Emile Sherman and Iain Canning will executive produce for See-Saw Films, with Keyes and Louise Gough also executive producers.

The cast includes Adrian Dunbar, Aisling Bea, Sarah Greene and Robert Sheehan, as well as Sinead Cusack, Barry Ward and Amy-Leigh Hickman with Karin Hanczewski, James Agnew, Katelyn Rose Downey.

Filming took place in Dublin in September 2025.

== Release ==
The series will premiere on Netflix on 14 January 2027.
