= Innocent (TV series) =

British television series

- Genre: Mystery; Drama; Anthology
- Created by: Matthew Arlidge; Chris Lang
- Written by: Matthew Arlidge; Chris Lang
- Directed by: Richard Clark
- Starring: Lee Ingleby; Katherine Kelly
- Composer: Samuel Sim
- Country of origin: United Kingdom
- Original language: English
- No. of series: 2
- No. of episodes: 8

Production
- Executive producers: Matthew Arlidge; Chris Lang; Jeremy Gwilt
- Producer: Jeremy Gwilt
- Cinematography: Dirk Nel
- Running time: 60 minutes
- Production company: TXTV

Original release
- Network: ITV
- Release: 14 May 2018 – 20 May 2021

Innocent is a British anthology television series, produced by TXTV productions, that was first broadcast on ITV for four consecutive nights between 14 and 17 May 2018. The first series stars Lee Ingleby as David Collins, Daniel Ryan as Phil Collins, David's faithful brother, Hermione Norris as Alice Moffatt and Adrian Rawlins as her husband, Rob Moffatt. The German TV broadcaster ARD produced a two-part adaptation, Unschuldig, first broadcast in December 2019. The second series, aired in 2021, starred Katherine Kelly, Andrew Tiernan, Priyanga Burford and Jamie Bamber.

== Plot ==
=== Series 1 ===
This series tells the story of David Collins (Lee Ingleby), who was convicted of murdering his wife Tara. After serving seven years in prison he was acquitted on a legal technicality. The story revolves around attempts to reveal the truth of who actually killed Tara, with the plot involving the police, Tara's sister Alice (Hermione Norris), who now has custody of Tara and David's children, and David's brother Phil (Daniel Ryan).

=== Series 2 ===
Matthew Taylor, a 16-year-old school boy was brutally murdered in the quiet Lake District. Five years later the accused is found not guilty and released from prison.

== Cast ==
=== Series 1 ===
- Lee Ingleby as David Collins
- Daniel Ryan as Phil Collins, David's faithful brother
- Fionn O'Shea as Jack Collins, David and Tara's son
- Eloise Webb as Rosie Collins, David and Tara's daughter
- Hermione Norris as Alice Moffatt, Tara's childless sister and Rob's wife who is guardian of Jack and Rosie
- Adrian Rawlins as Rob Moffatt, Alice's husband
- Elliot Cowan as Tom Wilson
- Christina Cole as Louise Wilson, Tom Wilson's first wife
- Hannah Britland as Melissa Wilson, Tom Wilson's second wife
- Nicholas Asbury as Ryland Hudson
- Tony Gardner as Detective Superintendent Hillman
- Nigel Lindsay as Detective Chief Inspector William Beech
- Angel Coulby as Detective Inspector Cathy Hudson
- Samuel Edward-Cook as Detective Constable Steve Beckton
- Zahra Ahmadi as Detective Sergeant Mari Luz Garcia

=== Series 2 ===
- Katherine Kelly as Sally Wright, the teacher accused of killing school boy Matthew Taylor but acquitted 5 years later
- Jamie Bamber as Sam Wright, Sally's ex-husband
- Shaun Dooley as Detective Chief Inspector Mike Braithwaite
- Priyanga Burford as Karen Moss, Sam's fiancée
- Andrew Tiernan as John Taylor, father of Matthew Taylor, the murdered school boy
- Nadia Albina as Jenny, Sally's friend and a journalist
- Laura Rollins as Detective Sergeant Suzy Jones
- Michael Stevenson as Detective Constable Dave Green
- Janine Wood as Detective Constable Mia Hollins
- Lucy Black as Maria Taylor, mother of Matthew Taylor
- Amy-Leigh Hickman as Bethany, Karen's daughter
- Ellie Rawnsley as Anna Stamp, a key witness at Sally's trial
- Poppy Miller as Superintendent Denham
- Michael Yare as Alf, Jenny's partner
- Krissi Bohn as Emily North, headteacher of the school
- Ian Kelsey as Building Site Foreman

== Episodes ==
Series	Episodes	Originally released	
Series	Episodes	First released	Last released
1	4	14 May 2018	17 May 2018
2	4	17 May 2021	20 May 2021

=== Series 1 (2018) ===
No.	Title	Directed by	Written by	British air date	UK viewers (million)
1	"Episode 1"	Richard Clark	Chris Lang	14 May 2018	7.65
David Collins is unexpectedly acquitted on a technicality having served seven years of a life sentence for the murder of his wife, Tara. On the steps of the court, he vows to bring to book those who lied at his original trial, to see the real killer jailed and more importantly, to regain custody of his two young children.
2	"Episode 2"	Richard Clark	Matthew Arlidge	15 May 2018	6.55
While DI Hudson's new investigation unearths serious flaws in the original murder investigation, those who were closest to Tara are forced to explain away credible motives for wanting to kill her. Relationships are strained to breaking and damaging accusations fly when David confronts his sister-in-law and her husband over access to his children.
3	"Episode 3"	Richard Clark	Chris Lang	16 May 2018	7.36
Alice and Rob's relationship continues to disintegrate as evidence under questioning incriminates them further and the children grow closer to David. Meanwhile, Tom's attempts to save his marriage are destroyed by his subsequent arrest, and forensic evidence throws new light on David's original conviction.
4	"Episode 4"	Richard Clark	Matthew Arlidge	17 May 2018	7.26
David's exoneration allows him to regain custody of his children while the investigation into Rob, Alice and Tom intensifies, leading to a critical arrest. But as damaging accusations concerning DI Hudson's relationship with David threaten to derail the case, her determination to deliver justice finally begins to unravel the mystery of who killed Tara.

=== Series 2 (2021) ===
No.	Title	Directed by	Written by	British air date	UK viewers (million)
1	"Episode 1"	Tracey Larcombe	Chris Lang	17 May 2021	7.78
Matthew Taylor, a 16-year-old schoolboy, was brutally murdered in the quiet Lake District. Five years later, the accused is found not guilty and released from prison, which leaves everyone wondering who really killed him.
2	"Episode 2"	Unknown	Unknown	18 May 2021	7.23
As Sally begins a confident return to work, the police question Anna Stamp to find out what she is hiding and, more importantly, what Matthew's parents are covering up. Karen grows increasingly paranoid over Sally and Sam.
3	"Episode 3"	Unknown	Unknown	19 May 2021	7.18
As Sally and Sam grow closer, the police investigation turns to Gary Walker, hoping to find out what his connection is. Bethany's connection to Matthew comes to light, as Karen admits a damning secret.
4	"Episode 4"	Unknown	Unknown	20 May 2021	7.40
With Karen still in police custody, Bethany takes matters into her own hands, making a crucial discovery and forcing a confession. Braithwaite and his team continue their search for more evidence, while Sam and Sally come to a decision.
