= This Charming Man (disambiguation) =

"This Charming Man" is a 1983 song by the Smiths.

This Charming Man may also refer to:

- This Charming Man (film), 2002 Danish short film
- This Charming Man (novel), 2008 novel by Marian Keyes
- Brian Fallon § This Charming Man, a 2004–2005 band
- "This Charming Man", an episode of Degrassi: The Next Generation (season 3), a teen drama TV series

== See also ==
- A Charming Man, 1941 Czechoslovak comedy film
