= Anybody Out There? =

2006 novel by Marian Keyes

- Author: Marian Keyes
- Language: English
- Genre: Fiction, humour, romance
- Publisher: Poolbeg Press Ltd
- Publication date: 2006
- Publication place: Ireland
- ISBN: 9780718147631
- Preceded by: Nothing Bad ever Happens in Tiffany's
- Followed by: This Charming Man

Anybody Out There? is a 2007 novel by Marian Keyes.

It is about Anna Walsh, a woman who is recovering from an injury whilst in her parents' residence in Dublin, Ireland, and is reminiscing about the life she once lived in New York. Anna is married to Aidan and had worked in public relations for a cosmetics firm in East Village.

== Plot ==
After being seriously injured in a road accident, Anna Walsh returns to her family home in Dublin to recover while longing to return to New York and reunite with her husband, Aidan. As the story unfolds through flashbacks, their relationship and married life are gradually revealed, along with the fact that Aidan was killed in the accident. Struggling to cope with her grief, Anna seeks comfort through spiritual meetings and distances herself from family, friends, and work. Her emotional turmoil intensifies when she discovers that Aidan had a son from a previous relationship, but she eventually learns the truth behind the situation.

== Reception ==
Catherine Sevigny of The Observer stated that it was a "vivid portrait of a recovery". Emma Hagestadt of The Independent described it as "Reminiscent of the 1990 feel-good movie Ghost".
