= Amy-Leigh Hickman =

English actress (born 1997)

- Born: 16 September 1997 (age 28); Hastings, East Sussex, England
- Education: St Leonards Academy
- Occupation: Actress
- Years active: 2009–present
- Television: Tracy Beaker Returns; The Dumping Ground; EastEnders; Ackley Bridge; Our Girl; You; Ruby Speaking

Amy-Leigh Hickman (born 16 September 1997) is an English actress. Hickman made her television debut as Carmen Howle in the CBBC series Tracy Beaker Returns, a role she reprised in the sequel series The Dumping Ground. She then went onto appear as Linzi Bragg in the BBC soap opera EastEnders, before being cast as Nasreen Paracha in the Channel 4 drama Ackley Bridge, a role for which she received a Royal Television Society Award. Her other roles include Ester Kamali in Strike Back (2013), Sia Marshall in Safe (2018), Mimi Saunders in Our Girl (2020), Bethany in Innocent (2021) and Nadia Fareedi in You (2023–2025).

== Early life ==
Hickman was born on 16 September 1997, to parents of Anglo-Indian heritage and was brought up in Hastings, East Sussex, where she attended The St Leonards Academy. When she was five, she began studying acting at The Theatre Workshop in Bexhill. She also took classes at the Mark Jermin Stage School in Cobham.

== Career ==
Hickman's casting in Tracy Beaker Returns, a spin off from The Story of Tracy Beaker was announced in December 2008. Hickman reprised her role of Carmen Howle in The Dumping Ground, a sequel to Tracy Beaker Returns from 2013 to 2016. In 2013, Hickman appeared in 6 episodes of Sky One's Strike Back as Ester. In 2015, Hickman appeared in BBC daytime soap opera, Doctors as Sara Boswell and in Casualty as Aisha Karim. She played the role of Carmen Howle in another The Dumping Ground spin-off, The Dumping Ground: I'm..., a webisode series. In 2014, Hickman played Princess Jasmine in her management's version of Aladdin, which took place in Swansea, Wales. Hickman starred in another of her management's pantomimes in late 2015, this time in Sleeping Beauty, playing the role of Jill, alongside her Tracy Beaker Returns co-star Joe Maw who played the corresponding Jack. In 2016, she appeared in Sleeping Beauty at the Sunderland Empire Theatre, where she played the role of Princess Briar Rose. Later that year, Hickman worked with Nationwide Education on the web series Get Real With Money, aimed at young people with the objective of educating them about money management and finances.

Hickman then appeared as a recurring character in the BBC soap opera EastEnders as Linzi Bragg, a love interest for Jay Brown (Jamie Borthwick), from February until April 2016 and returned for a short stint in March 2017. From 2017 to 2019, Hickman portrayed Nasreen Paracha in Channel 4 school drama Ackley Bridge. In 2018, Hickman appeared in the Netflix original series Safe as Sia Marshall. Also in 2018, Hickman played Leah in a stage production titled Beautiful Thing by the Tobacco Factory Theatre. In July 2019, she starred in the BBC Three special The Left Behind, as Yasmin. In 2020, she starred in the fourth series of the BBC drama Our Girl as Mimi Saunders. Later that year, it was announced that Hickman would be starring in the second series of the ITV crime drama series Innocent, which aired in May 2021. Later in 2021, she co-starred in the short film True Colours alongside Tilly Keeper. She then starred in a revival of the play East is East alongside Ackley Bridge co-stars Tony Jayawardena and Gurjeet Singh at the Birmingham Repertory Theatre.

In April 2022, it was announced that Hickman had been cast in the fourth series of the Netflix series You. 2023 saw her return to the stage in a production of Passing. She subsequently starred in the ITVX series Ruby Speaking, and later returned for the fifth and final series of You. Following the series, Hickman appeared in Jack the Ripper: Written in Blood, a miniseries broadcast on Sky History in 2025. Later that year, she was announced as a main cast member for Netflix's Grown Ups, an adaptation of the 2020 novel by Marian Keyes. She will portray Nell.

== Filmography ==
=== Television and film ===
Year	Title	Role	Notes
2010–2012	Tracy Beaker Returns	Carmen Howle	Main role
2011	Tracy Beaker Survival Files	Carmen Howle	11 episodes
2013	Strike Back	Ester Kamali	6 episodes
2013–2016	The Dumping Ground	Carmen Howle	Regular role
2014	The Dumping Ground Survival Files	Carmen Howle	4 episodes
2015	Doctors	Sara Boswell	Episode: "The Dark Net"
2015	Casualty	Aisha Karim	Episode: "The Next Step"
2016	The Dumping Ground: I'm...	Carmen Howle	Regular role
2016–2017	EastEnders	Linzi Bragg	Recurring role
2017	Sam & Mark's Big Friday Wind-Up	Herself	1 episode
2017	Top Class	Herself	1 episode
2017–2019	Ackley Bridge	Nasreen Paracha	Main role
2018	Safe	Sia Marshall	Main role
2019	Glow Up: Britain's Next Make-Up Star	Herself	Guest star
2019	The Left Behind	Yasmin	Television film
2020	Our Girl	Mimi Saunders	Main role
2020	Tin Star	Saima Saleem	Episode: "Loves Young Dream"
2021	Innocent	Bethany	Supporting role
2021	True Colours	Ayesha	Short film
2023–2025	You	Nadia Fareedi	Main role (series 4); recurring role (series 5)
2023	Ruby Speaking	Ellie	Main role
2025	Jack the Ripper: Written in Blood	Henrietta Best	Main role
2025	Shakespeare & Hathaway: Private Investigators	Leah Grace	Episode: "The Endeavour of This Present Breath"
2026	Industry	Elaine Jordan	Episode: "1000 Yoots, 1 Marilyn"
TBA	Grown Ups	Nell	Main role

=== Voice roles ===
Year	Title	Role	Note
2011	Tracy Beaker Returns: You Choose	Carmen Howle	Video game
2013–2014	The Dumping Ground Game	Carmen Howle	Video game
2015	The Dumping Ground: You're the Boss	Carmen Howle	Video game
2020	The Saddle Club	Narrator	Voiceover
2022	The Unstoppable Yellow Yeti	Rita	TV series

== Stage ==
Year	Title	Role
2014	Aladdin	Princess Jasmine
2015	Sleeping Beauty	Jill
2016	Sleeping Beauty	Princess Briar Rose
2018	Beautiful Thing	Leah
2021	East is East	Meenah
2023	Passing	Rachel Singh

== Awards and nominations ==
Year	Award	Category	Work	Result	Ref.
2017	RTS North East and Border Television Awards	Performance of the Year	The Dumping Ground	Nominated	
2020	RTS Yorkshire Awards	Actor	Ackley Bridge	Won	
