= Laura Rollins =

British actress (born 1988)

- Born: 20 December 1988 (age 37); Birmingham, England
- Education: University of Leeds; Arts Educational School
- Occupation: Actress
- Years active: 1998–present

Laura Rollins (born 20 December 1988) is a British actress, known for portraying the role of Ayesha Lee on the BBC soap opera Doctors, a role which she played from 2014 to 2020. For her portrayal of Ayesha, she received an accolade at the RTS Midlands Awards. Since leaving Doctors, Rollins has appeared in various television series including Innocent and Miss Scarlet and The Duke.

== Life and career ==
Rollins was born on 20 December 1984. She is of British and Barbadian heritage. She began her acting training at the Custard Factory aged nine, after which she was offered a place at the Carlton Junior Television Workshop. Whilst attending, Rollins made her television debut on the children's series The Demon Headmaster in 1998, at the age of ten. She was also featured in various advertisements and performed at the British Academy Children's Awards.

In 1999, Rollins starred in Welcome To Orty Fou as Caroline Saunders. After leaving the workshop, Rollins began attending the University of Leeds, studying English and theatre. She then did a one-year course at Arts Educational Schools in London.

In 2013, she appeared in the feature film Communion, and in 2014, she auditioned for a role in the BBC soap opera Doctors. She took a sick day from work to attend the audition, and after a two-week process, she was given the role of Ayesha Lee. While on the series, Rollins' character's storylines included romances with co-workers Sid Vere (Ashley Rice) and Bear Sylvester (Dex Lee), facing prejudice due to her race and troubled upbringing and struggling with her mother's alcoholism and subsequent death, for which she won a Royal Television Society award. On 20 May 2020, it was announced that Rollins would be leaving Doctors after six years. Her final scenes aired on 5 June 2020.

Rollins starred in the 2016 short film From Noya, and the 2018 short film Shining Tor, for which she won Best Performance for at the 2019 Short Film Awards. In 2020, Rollins appeared in an episode of the BBC crime drama Silent Witness as Kate Langley. In 2021, she starred in the second series of the ITV drama Innocent. Then in 2022, she made appearances in Father Brown and Miss Scarlet and The Duke. 2025 saw Rollins appear in The Chelsea Detective, as well as star in Jack the Ripper: Written in Blood. A year later, she appeared in an episode of the BBC medical drama Casualty.

== Filmography ==
=== Film ===
Year	Title	Role	Notes
2013	Communion	Anna	
2016	From Noya	Paige	Short film
2018	Details to Follow	Gaia	Short film
2018	Shining Tor	Amber	Short film
2019	That Phone Call	Willow	Short film
2020	Fortune Cookie	Natalie	Short film
2021	There's Always Hope	Sanya	
2022	Broke	Therapist	Short film
2024	Hollow	Farah	Short film
2025	Sober	Pamela	
2025	Between the Piers	Meghan	Short film
2026	The House on Lidderman Street	Hazel	

=== Television ===
Year	Title	Role	Notes
1998	The Demon Headmaster	Game Show Winner	1 episode
1999	Welcome to Orty-Fou	Caroline Saunders	4 episodes
2014–2020	Doctors	Ayesha Lee	Regular role
2018–2019	The Reserves	Jamie	Also executive producer
2020	Silent Witness	Kate Langley	Episode: "Hope: Part 1"
2021	Innocent	DS Suzy Jones	Main role
2022	Father Brown	Helen Delaney	Episode: "The Wayward Girls"
2022	Miss Scarlet and The Duke	Clementine	Recurring role
2023	Death in Paradise	Cheryl Horner	Episode: "#12.3"
2023	Champion	Mercedes	Episode: "Rise of the Phoenix"
2023	The Good Ship Murder	Courtney Campbell	Episode: "Malta"
2025	The Chelsea Detective	Zoe Parrish	Episode: "For the Greater Good"
2025	Jack the Ripper: Written in Blood	Annabel	Main role
2026	Casualty	Iona Hodgins	1 episode

=== Audio ===
Year	Title	Role	Notes
2020	The Archers	Midwife / Lauren	2 episodes
2023	Doctor Who: The Ninth Doctor Adventures	Cath	Episode: "The Colour of Terror"
2023	Star Cops	Anya Selby	Episode: "Grandma's Footsteps"
2025	Doctor Who: The First Doctor Adventures	Umbriel	Episode: "The Living Darkness"

== Awards and nominations ==
Year	Award	Category	Work	Result	Ref.
2015	Screen Nation	Female Performance in TV	Doctors	Nominated	
2016	British Soap Awards	Best Actress	Doctors	Longlisted	
2018	National Television Awards	Serial Drama Performance	Doctors	Longlisted	
2018	British Soap Awards	Best Female Dramatic Performance	Doctors	Nominated	
2018	RTS Midlands Awards	Acting Performance – Female	Doctors	Won	
2018	Inside Soap Awards	Best Daytime Star	Doctors	Longlisted	
2019	British Soap Awards	Best Actress	Doctors	Longlisted	
2019	Short Film Awards	Best Performance	Shining Tor	Won	
