= James Scully (actor) =

American actor (born 1992)

- Born: James Nicholas Scully; April 19, 1992 (age 34); San Antonio, Texas, U.S.
- Education: Otterbein University (BFA)
- Occupation: Actor
- Years active: 2016–present

James Nicholas Scully (born April 19, 1992) is an American actor, best known for portraying JD in the Paramount Network series Heathers (2018) and Forty Quinn in the Netflix thriller series You.

== Early life ==
Scully was born and raised in San Antonio, Texas. He attended Driscoll Middle School and LEE High School's North East School of the Arts (Class of 2010), both of which are in North East Independent School District. In his youth, he spent a brief period in England when his father was stationed there as a part of the United States Air Force.

He later attended Otterbein University, where he earned a Bachelor of Fine Arts in musical theater. Scully was also a cycling instructor for three and a half years at SWERVE Fitness.

== Career ==
Prior to working in Los Angeles, Scully resided in New York performing Off-Broadway.

In 2016, Scully made his acting debut in the web series drama series, Sublets. Following his first role, Scully later made appearances in television series, such as Quantico and 9-1-1.

He has also done commercial work for Outback Steakhouse and a public service announcement about Vicodin abuse with Riverdale actress, Camila Mendes.

In 2018, Scully starred in the main role of JD on the Paramount Network series Heathers. In January 2019, it was announced that Scully had been cast as Forty Quinn on the second season of the Netflix thriller series You.

He also portrayed Charlie, one of the main love interests in the 2022 Hulu film Fire Island. Scully stated Fire Island portrays gay culture as it is, and that gays are no longer attempting to mirror straight culture: "this is what queer culture looks like. This is how queer people are. I guess, sorry if you're not into it."

In 2024, Scully began portraying "Mary's Teacher" (later identified as John Wilkes Booth) in the comedic play Oh, Mary!. The show transferred to Broadway in July 2024, marking Scully's Broadway debut.

== Personal life ==
As of 2022, Scully is in a relationship with Julio Torres.

He has been "very publicly bullied for keeping (his) shirt on multiple times," at gay locations like Ginger Roger's beach in Santa Monica, and Fire Island, but now feels that "We're not stripping down to our underwear even as an exercise in like sexual attraction. It's more about just peeling it all away."

== Filmography ==
=== Film ===
Year	Title	Role	Notes
2019	Straight Up	Ryder	
2020	The Last Thing He Wanted	Sloppy Reporter	
2022	Fire Island	Charlie	
2023	Problemista	Bingham	
2024	Something's More Than One Thing	Remy	

=== Television ===
Year	Title	Role	Notes
2016	Sublets	Party Guest	Episode: "Batman's Girlfriend"
2017	Quantico	Tate	Episode: "Mockingbird"
2018	Heathers	Jason "JD" Dean	Main role; 10 episodes
2018	9-1-1	Travis	Episode: "Merry Ex-Mas"
2019–2021	You	Forty Quinn	Main role (Season 2); Guest role (Season 3)
2021	Modern Love	Ford	Episode: "How Do You Remember Me?"
2022-2023	Titans	Bernard Fitzmartin	Recurring role (9 episodes)
2024	Fantasmas	Pomeranian (voice), Producer	Two episodes
2026	The Gilded Age	Lee Klein	Recurring role, season 4

=== Video games ===
Year	Title	Role	Notes
2019	Telling Lies	Eric	
