= Ruby Speaking =

British Television series

- Genre: Comedy
- Created by: Abigail Wilson; Jayde Adams; Lucy Lumsden
- Screenplay by: Abigail Wilson
- Directed by: Rosie Gaunt-Mathieson
- Starring: Jayde Adams; Joe Sims; Katherine Kelly; Sam Swainsbury
- Country of origin: United Kingdom
- Original language: English
- No. of series: 1
- No. of episodes: 6

Production
- Executive producer: Lucy Lumsden
- Editor: Jake Robertson
- Production company: Yellow Door Productions

Original release
- Network: ITVX
- Release: 22 June 2023

Ruby Speaking is a six-part British comedy television series for ITVX made by Yellow Door Productions, created and written by Abigail Wilson, and co-created with Jayde Adams and Lucy Lumsden. It stars Adams, Katherine Kelly, Sam Swainsbury and Joe Sims.

After an initial release exclusive to ITVX in June 2023, the show was broadcast on linear television on ITV2 in January and February 2024. It ran for one series.

== Synopsis ==
Working in a call-centre called Hellocom in South Bristol, recently single Ruby is popular amongst other staff, but puts others over herself and over a sale as she struggles to keep to the call-centre script.

== Cast ==
- Jayde Adams as Ruby Morgan, a gregarious call-centre worker whose lively interactions with customers, that she has genuine interest in, masks her otherwise lack of enthusiasm for the job, but is not able to cover up for her lacklustre sales record and routinely puts her job security in jeopardy.
- Joe Sims as Tom Drindle, whose braggadocio over his supreme sales record, and bootlicking, becomes heavily obnoxious.
- Katherine Kelly as Vicki, the manipulative company head.
- Sam Swainsbury as Mark, uptight but generally dependable and keen to see his colleagues succeed, seeing himself as the de facto head of the Bristol branch of Hellocom.
- Jamal Franklin as Cameron Cole, a student only temporarily working at Hellocom, but already roping several co-workers into a choir that Ruby reluctantly is enlisted to become the head of.
- Nicky Goldie as Donna DiMaggio
- Amy-Leigh Hickman as Ellie
- Dan Hiscox as Craig, the eccentric building security guard.
- Kiera Lester as Melons, an impressive new starter.
- Rebecca Lock as Rubys choral nemesis, Helen Windows
- Gledys Ibarra

== Episodes ==
No.	Title	Directed by	Written by	ITVX release date	ITV2 airdate
1	"Episode 1"	Rosie Gaunt-Mathieson	Abigail Wilson	22 June 2023	16 January 2024
Ruby's job is on the line as her non-existent sales record finally comes back to bite her, with boss Vicki deciding to give her one last chance. Mark struggles to ensure she sticks to the script as Ruby gets herself into a romantic entanglement with him and Ellie - who, despite the two being obvious incompatible, he has feelings for - and realises that her steadfastly ensuring she prioritises her geniality with customers who appreciate it over constantly trying to upsell does not always lead to disappointing results, and can be more important than always having a business-minded head.
2	"Episode 2"	Rosie Gaunt-Mathieson	Abigail Wilson	22 June 2023	23 January 2024
3	"Episode 3"	Rosie Gaunt-Mathieson	Abigail Wilson	22 June 2023	30 January 2024
4	"Episode 4"	Rosie Gaunt-Mathieson	Abigail Wilson	22 June 2023	6 February 2024
5	"Episode 5"	Rosie Gaunt-Mathieson	Abigail Wilson	22 June 2023	13 February 2024
6	"Episode 6"	Rosie Gaunt-Mathieson	Abigail Wilson	22 June 2023	20 February 2024

== Production ==
The series is produced by Lucy Lumsden and Jayde Adams for Yellow Door Productions. Ideas for the show were loosely inspired by Adams time spent working at a centre in the Stokes Croft area of Bristol.

=== Casting ===
In the cast are local actors from Bristol who answered open casting adverts, including Dan Hiscox who was working as a care assistant in nearby village Pucklechurch.

=== Filming ===
Filming began in January 2023. Filming took place in the Totterdown area of South Bristol.

== Broadcast ==
The series was made available on ITVX from 22 June 2023.

== Reception ==
Steve Bennett wrote, in a two-and-a-half star review for Chortle, that Adams' character Ruby is "just a little too bland to sustain the viewer’s interest – which is something of a surprise for anyone familiar with Adams's often brash, larger-than-life stand-up performances". However, he praised the relatability of the characters - rather than being "comedy archetypes" - and that the show was mostly "built on gentleness, both of the characters and of the action", but that "it may be quite a big ask for a streaming show to hope audiences stick with the show and warm to its laid-back pace".
