= Something's More Than One Thing =

- Directed by: Jay Alvarez
- Written by: Jay Alvarez
- Produced by: Jay Alvarez; Alexander Fraser; Will Hand; Megan Kopp
- Starring: Devan Costa; Alex Sgmabati; Will Hand; Soko; James Scully
- Cinematography: Ray Buckley
- Edited by: Ray Buckley
- Music by: Evyn Oliver
- Production company: Indoor Feeling Productions
- Release date: June 2024 (Raindance)
- Running time: 110 minutes
- Country: United States
- Language: English

Something's More Than One Thing is a 2024 American satirical comedy drama film written and directed by Jay Alvarez and starring Devan Costa, Alex Sgmabati, Will Hand, Soko and James Scully. The Russo brothers serve as executive producers of the film.

== Cast ==
- Devan Costa as Dylan
- Alex Sgambati as Caitlin
- James Scully as Remy
- Soko as Amber
- Will Hand as Nate

== Release ==
The film premiered at the 32nd Raindance Film Festival in June 2024.

== Reception ==
Linda Marric of HeyUGuys awarded the film two stars out of five.

Tim Grierson of Screen International gave the film a negative review and wrote, “But despite the tender tone and novel design, this gentle drama does not have much new to say about the challenges of making love last.”
