= Sam Swainsbury =

English actor

Sam Swainsbury is an English actor, known for his roles as Jason in the BBC sitcom Mum and the Stonehenge TV reporter in Thor: The Dark World.

== Early life and education ==
Sam Swainsbury was born in Colchester and grew up in Halstead, Essex. He attended Holy Trinity School. He participated in workshops at the Quay Theatre in Sudbury.

== Career ==
In 2013, Swainsbury featured on the film Thor: The Dark World, he played a Stonehenge TV News Reporter. From 2016 to 2019, he starred in the BBC sitcom Mum, as Jason. In 2017, Swainsbury appeared on Fearless, a six-part British crime thriller drama series, he played Kevin Russell, a 37-year-old man who insists he was wrongly imprisoned for 14 years for the murder of Linda Simms. In 2019, he appeared in an episode of the ITV drama Victoria as Dr John Snow.

== Filmography ==
=== Film ===
Year	Title	Role	Notes
2010	Jacob	Simmons	Short film
2012	EPiSODE	FBI Special Agent King	Short film
2013	House of Knives	Paul Verlaine	Short film
2013	Thor: The Dark World	Stonehenge TV News Reporter	
2015	The Cannibal in the Jungle	Gary Ward Recon	
2016	The Unfolding	Radio Expert 2	
2017	Annie Waits	Johnny	Short film
2019	Fisherman's Friends	Rowan	

=== Television ===
Year	Title	Role	Notes
2007	Jekyll	Estate Agent	1 episode
2008	Harley Street	Tim	1 episode
2012	Doctors	PC Wes Harding	2 episodes
2013	Call the Midwife	Alan Bridges	Episode: "Christmas Special"
2015	Atlantis	Nestor	2 episodes
2016–2019	Mum	Jason	Main role
2017	Fearless	Kevin Russell	6 episodes
2019	Victoria	Dr. John Snow	Episode: "Foreign Bodies"
2023	Ruby Speaking	Mark	Main role
2023	Hullraisers	Jason Pickles	4 episodes
2024	The Red King	Father Douglas Carrisford	Main role
2024	Ludwig	Mr Bishop	1 episode
2024	Dalgliesh: Cover Her Face	DI Clive Roscoe	2 episodes
2026	Run Away	Professor Van De Beek	

== Theatre ==
Year	Title	Role	Notes
2026	Relics	Rob	

== Awards and nominations ==
Year	Award	Category	Nominated work	Result	Ref.
2009	Ian Charleson Awards	Ian Charleson Award	A Midsummer Night's Dream	Nominated	
2009	Ian Charleson Awards	Ian Charleson Award	The Merchant of Venice	Nominated	
