= Joe Sims (actor) =

British actor

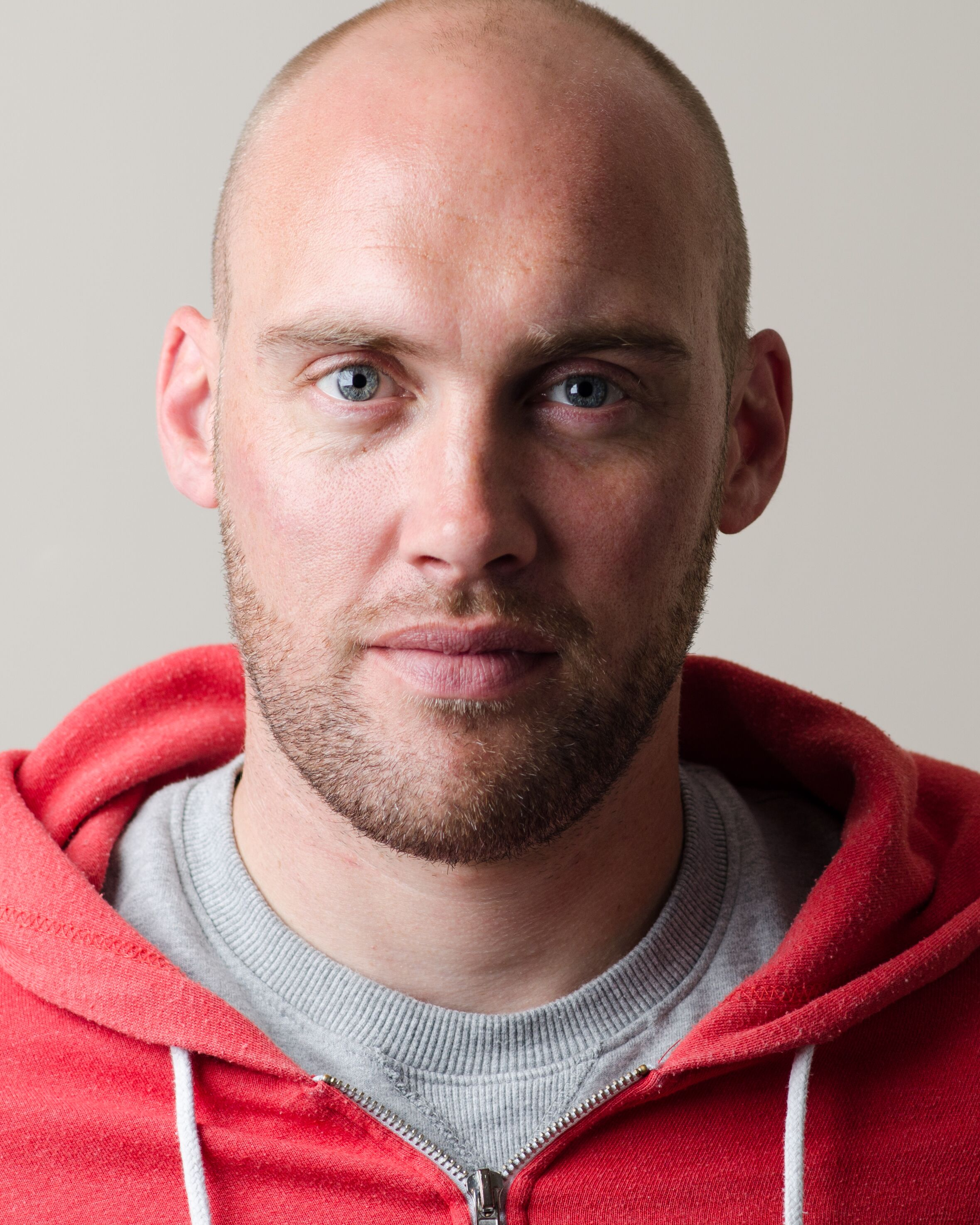
- Born: 1980 (age 45–46); Bristol, England
- Education: Filton College
- Alma mater: Middlesex University

Joe Sims (born 1980) is a British actor known primarily for his roles in ITV's drama Broadchurch where he played plumber Nige Carter, and as a voice actor, the Tenth Doctor's companion Mark Seven in Doctor Who, through Big Finish Productions audio dramas.

== Early life ==
Sims was born in Southmead Hospital, Bristol in 1980, and raised in Kingswood. He attended Sir Bernard Lovell School, where he was inspired to act by a drama teacher who introduced him to the Bristol Old Vic company. Sims later attended Filton College before studying at Middlesex University and under scholarship at the University of San Francisco.

== Career ==
Sims received the 2012 Offie for "People's Favourite Male Performance" for his role as alleged Texan killer Lee Fenton in As We Forgive Them at the Arcola Theatre in London.

Sims has appeared extensively on television and stage and has a real ear for voices and accents performing over 100 different characters for radio including radio drama The Archers, whilst his varied TV appearances include Endeavour, Father Brown, Ultimate Force, Uncle, The Basil Brush Show, children's animation Chuggington and BBC One drama Casualty.

In 2009, Sims played the role of Sergeant De Graffe in the Indonesian film Merah Putih, as well as its 2010 sequel, Derah Garuda.

In 2010, Sims appeared as himself in an episode of Don't Tell the Bride (‘The One with the Wurzels’). Sims was best man at his brother Tom's wedding, where although his appearance was uncredited, and he was described as a “teacher from London”, eagle-eyed fans of his work recognised him “Sim”mediately.

In 2013, Sims first appeared as Nigel Carter in ITV's BAFTA winning drama Broadchurch. He reprised the role for the programme's second and third series.

In 2014, Sims voiced Creighton the Wanderer & Magerold of Lanafir in Dark Souls II. He also portrayed the murderer of Joanna Yeates, Dutchman Vincent Tabak, in the BAFTA winning ITV docu-drama The Lost Honour of Christopher Jefferies.

In 2016, Sims played the recurring role of Greff who is the head of the mining community in ITV's Beowulf: Return to the Shieldlands. In 2017 he appeared in Fox TV's Houdini & Doyle, Midsomer Murders “Crime and Punishment”, Sci-Fi cult hit Red Dwarf and Series 2 of Stan Lee's Lucky Man. In 2018 he played evil Step Father Dean in a 4 part adaptation of Joe All Alone by Joanna Nadin and shot a feature film playing King Duncan in Macbeth.

Sims was also nominated for Best Supporting Actor at 2017 BBC Audio Drama Awards for his role in BBC Radio 4's drama Lifelines where he played a suicidal boxer.

The following year he was nominated for Best Actor at the 2018 BBC Audio Drama Awards for his role as Charlie Hammond in Oliver Park: The Easter Riot.

2019 saw Sims being directed in US/U.K. feature film Everything I Ever Wanted To Tell My Daughter About Men where he plays graffiti artist Moody and is directed by Tara Fitzgerald. He's also appearing in the new series of Britannia, Shakespeare and Hathaway, Agatha Raisin “The Haunted House” and Plebs. He also played series regular and Mayoral enforcer Geoff in the Netflix series Free Rein.

2020 Saw Sims play ex Premier League footballer Paul Williamson in Iain Morris and Damon Beasley's BBC Comedy The First Team.

In 2021 Sims first appears in Dr Who as David Tennant's companion, android Mark Seven in Dalek Universe for Big Finish.

2022 Saw Sims narrating the hit Channel 4 series Sarah Beeny's New Life In The Country. He also played the role of Deputy Marshal Arnhost in the Doctor Who episode "The Power of the Doctor".

In 2023 he filmed Jayde Adams co-created comedy set in a Bristolian call centre called Ruby Speaking for ITVX, in which he plays series regular Tom Drindle.

In September 2023, Sims was given his own radio show and was announced as the new breakfast show presenter on BBC Radio Bristol, Starting in October.His Breakfast Show was included in BBC Radio 4's Pick Of The Year for 2023. In 2024, he was cast as Joe Summers in BBC One series Reunion. In 2025 he signed up for two series of US fantasy TV show Wayfinders playing the double crossing Uzek warrior Riplaggish.

In April 26 Joe Sims’ Proper Bristol Breakfast on BBC Radio Bristol was nominated for Best Speech Breakfast Radio Show at the prestigious ARIAS awards in London which he won on 21st May 2026 at an illustrious ceremony at Camden Roundhouse.
