= You (TV series) =

2018 American psychological thriller series

- Genre: Psychological thriller
- Based on: You by Caroline Kepnes
- Developed by: Greg Berlanti; Sera Gamble
- Showrunners: Sera Gamble; Michael Foley; Justin W. Lo
- Starring: Penn Badgley; Elizabeth Lail; Luca Padovan; Zach Cherry; Shay Mitchell; Victoria Pedretti; Jenna Ortega; James Scully; Ambyr Childers; Carmela Zumbado; Saffron Burrows; Tati Gabrielle; Shalita Grant; Travis Van Winkle; Dylan Arnold; Charlotte Ritchie; Tilly Keeper; Amy-Leigh Hickman; Ed Speleers; Lukas Gage; Griffin Matthews; Anna Camp; Madeline Brewer
- Narrated by: Penn Badgley (Note: Elizabeth Lail, Victoria Pedretti, Tati Gabrielle, and Madeline Brewer partially narrate an episode of the first, third, fourth, and fifth seasons, respectively.)
- Composer: Blake Neely
- Country of origin: United States
- Original language: English
- No. of seasons: 5
- No. of episodes: 50

Production
- Executive producers: Marcos Siega; Gina Girolamo; Les Morgenstein; Sarah Schechter; Sera Gamble; Greg Berlanti; Lee Toland Krieger; Silver Tree; Michael Foley; Azalea Brooke; David Madden; Justin W. Lo; Neil Reynolds; John Scott
- Producers: Ryan Lindbum; Adria Lang; Jason Sokoloff; Jennifer Lence; Wayne Carmona; Hillary Benefiel; Carl Ogawa; Penn Badgley; Stephanie Johnson
- Production locations: New York City; Los Angeles, California; London, England
- Cinematography: David Lanzenberg; W. Mott Hupfel; Seamus Tierney; Cort Fey; Byron Shah; Milos Moore; Stijn Van Der Veken; Minka Farthing-Kohl
- Editors: Harry Jierjian; Gaston Jaren Lopez; Troy Takaki; Rita K. Sanders; Felicia M. Livingston; Erin Wolf; Becca Berry; Patrick Brian; Piper Kroeze; Alexander Aquino-Kaljakin; Hovig Menakian
- Camera setup: Single-camera
- Running time: 41–60 minutes
- Production companies: Man Sewing Dinosaur; Berlanti Productions; Alloy Entertainment; A+E Studios; Warner Horizon Television (seasons 1–2); Warner Bros. Television (seasons 3–5)

Original release
- Network: Lifetime
- Release: September 9 – November 11, 2018
- Network: Netflix
- Release: December 26, 2019 – April 24, 2025

You is an American psychological thriller television series based on the books by Caroline Kepnes. It was developed by Greg Berlanti and Sera Gamble, produced by Berlanti Productions, Alloy Entertainment, and A+E Studios, in association with Warner Horizon Television.

The first season, based on the novel You, premiered on Lifetime in September 2018. It follows Joe Goldberg, a bookstore manager and serial killer who develops an extreme obsession with a woman he meets at his bookstore. The season stars Penn Badgley, Elizabeth Lail, Luca Padovan, Zach Cherry, and Shay Mitchell. Lifetime announced in July 2018 that You had been renewed for a second season, loosely based on Kepnes' follow-up novel Hidden Bodies. The series later moved to Netflix and the second season was released in December 2019. The season follows Joe as he moves to Los Angeles and falls in love with local heiress Love Quinn. For the second season, Ambyr Childers was upgraded to a series regular, joining newly cast Victoria Pedretti, James Scully, Jenna Ortega, and Carmela Zumbado.

In January 2020, the series was renewed for a third season by Netflix, which was released on October 15, 2021. In the third season, Saffron Burrows was upgraded to a series regular, joining newly cast Travis Van Winkle, Shalita Grant, Tati Gabrielle, and Dylan Arnold. In October 2021, ahead of the third-season premiere, the series was renewed for a fourth season, which was released over two parts on February 9 and March 9, 2023. The season also stars Charlotte Ritchie, Tilly Keeper, Amy-Leigh Hickman, Ed Speleers and Lukas Gage. In March 2023, the series was renewed for a fifth and final season, which was released on April 24, 2025. The season also stars Griffin Matthews, Anna Camp and Madeline Brewer.

== Premise ==
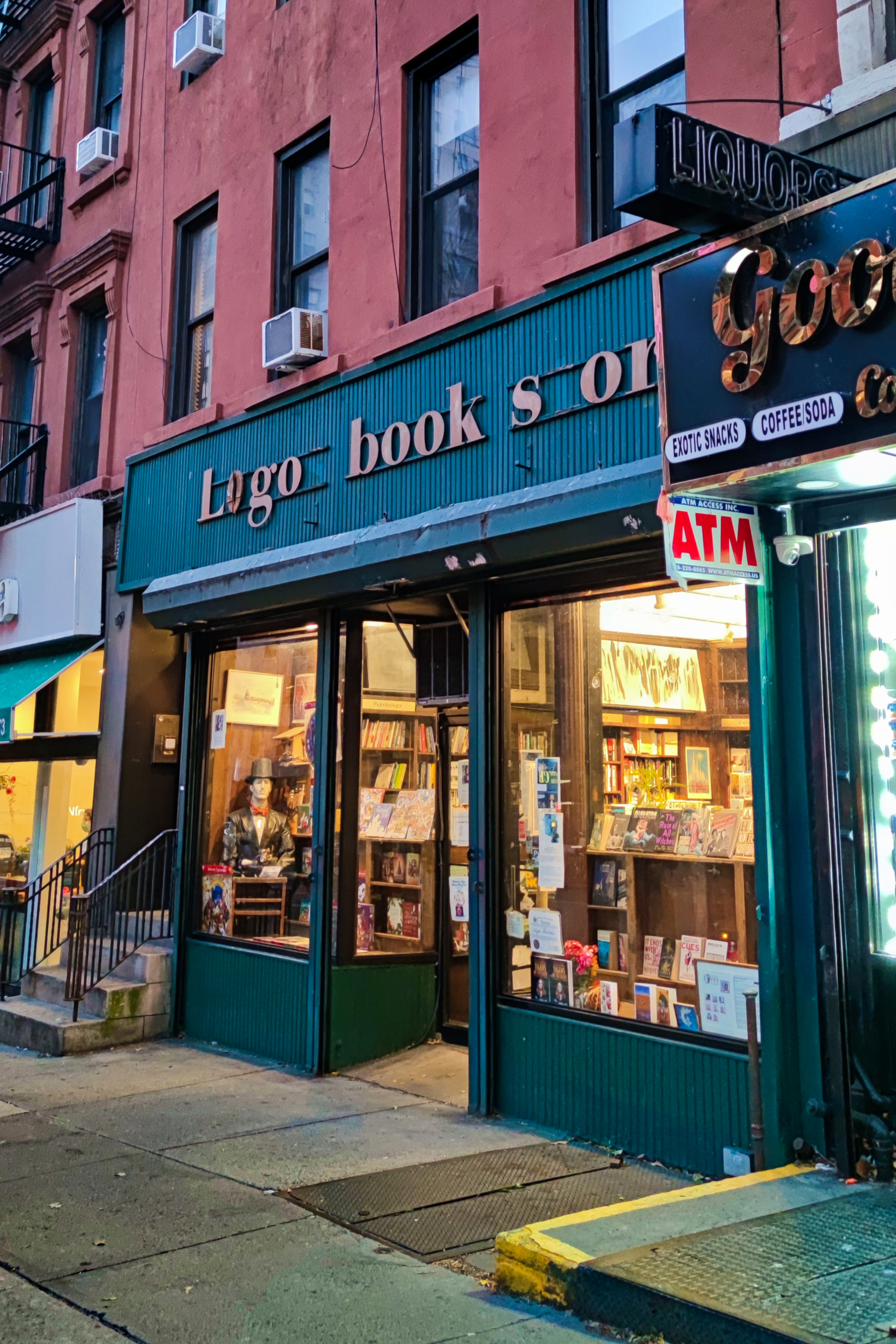
Joe's bookstore (first season)

In the first season, Joe Goldberg meets Guinevere Beck, a broke college student and an aspiring writer. Joe quickly becomes consumed with his one-sided infatuation, feeding his obsession through social media and using technology to stalk and track her activities. This behavior escalates and leads to Joe taking drastic measures to remove obstacles to their romance—including her friends and ex-boyfriend.

In the second season, Joe Goldberg moves from New York to Los Angeles to escape his past. He starts over with a new identity to hide from his ex-girlfriend Candace, who seeks revenge for burying her alive prior to the start of season one. When he meets avid chef Love Quinn, Joe begins falling into his old patterns of obsession and violence. As Joe attempts to forge a new love, he strives to make his relationship with Love succeed at all costs to avoid the fate of his past romantic endeavors. Unbeknownst to him, Love has dark secrets herself.

In the third season, Joe and Love are married and raising their newborn son Henry in the Californian suburb of Madre Linda. As their relationship dynamic takes a new turn, Joe continues to repeat the cycle of obsession. First he develops a burgeoning interest in Natalie, the next door neighbor, then the local librarian, Marienne. However, Love ensures that her dream of having the perfect family will not be torn away so easily, regardless of the cost.

In the fourth season, Joe is living in London and working as an English professor under the alias Jonathan Moore. After following Marienne from Paris, he vows to put the past behind him and let Marienne go. After rescuing his neighbor Kate during a robbery, Joe is invited into a circle of wealthy socialites. However, they start to die off one by one as a serial murderer targets their elite group. Joe reverts to his old habits when he is framed for the deaths and blackmailed by the killer. While trying to keep his true identity hidden from the group and working to catch the killer, Joe develops feelings for Kate despite knowing it is not something he should do.

In the fifth and final season, Joe returns to New York City with his new wife and is ready to live a good life at last. However, his past and dark desires will collide with this new life, when he meets Bronté.

== Cast and characters ==
- Penn Badgley as Joe Goldberg, a charming but dangerous man who shows traits of narcissistic and antisocial personality disorders that primarily manifest as an obsessive romantic fixation. He is first introduced as the manager of Mooney's bookstore in New York, who stalks and dates Beck in the first season. In the second season, he transfers to Los Angeles and going by the name Will Bettelheim, gets himself employed as a bookstore clerk at Anavrin, where he falls into old patterns after meeting the store's manager, Love Quinn. In the third season, he is going by Joe once more, married to Love and raising their son, Henry in the suburbs. In the fourth season, Joe is in London masquerading as a university professor called Jonathan Moore, obsessing over Kate and has kidnapped Marienne. He begins disassociating and has a mental break. In the fifth season, he reverts once more to his original name, and his new obsession is Bronte. Joe is portrayed as a teenager by Gianni Ciardiello in the first season, and as a child by Aidan Wallace and Jack Fisher in the second and third seasons, respectively.
- Elizabeth Lail as Guinevere Beck (season 1; special guest seasons 2 & 4–5), a broke NYU graduate MFA student with daddy issues and an aspiring writer and poet who enters into a relationship with Joe, with secrets of her own
- Luca Padovan as Paco (season 1, special appearance season 5), Joe's young neighbor who sees Joe as a source of support and a role model, who Joe helps when his abusive step-father is threatening
- Zach Cherry as Ethan Russell (season 1, special appearance season 5), a bookstore clerk who works with Joe and dates Beck's friend Blythe
- Shay Mitchell as Peach Salinger (season 1), (Note: Mitchell is credited as a series regular for episodes 1 through 6 of the first season.) a wealthy and influential socialite, with narcissistic, controlling and obsessive qualities and Beck's best friend whom she met at Brown University, who harbors a secret passion for her
- Victoria Pedretti as Love Quinn (seasons 2–3, special guest season 4), an aspiring chef and health guru in Los Angeles who gets involved with Joe and has dark secrets herself, they later have a son, Henry
- Carmela Zumbado as Delilah Alves (season 2), Ellie's older sister, an investigative reporter who leases Joe's flat to him and they have a brief romantic encounter
- Jenna Ortega as Ellie Alves (season 2), Delilah's fifteen-year-old sister who lives in the same block of apartments as Joe/Will, with a passion for film
- James Scully as Forty Quinn (season 2; special guest season 3), Love's beloved and troubled twin brother who relies on Love for support in most matters due to his addictions and mental health issues
- Ambyr Childers as Candace Stone (season 2; recurring season 1), Joe's ex-girlfriend from before Beck, who follows him to Los Angeles seeking revenge
- Saffron Burrows as Dottie Quinn (season 3; recurring season 2, special appearance season 5), (Note: Burrows is credited as a series regular for episodes 1 through 7 of the third season.) Love and Forty's mother who is narcissistic and an alcoholic
- Tati Gabrielle as Marienne Bellamy (seasons 3–4, special guest season 5), (Note: Gabrielle is credited as a series regular only for the episodes in which she appears in the fourth season.) a librarian and keen observer of the neighborhood's denizens. Beneath her practical exterior, Marienne is hiding personal struggles with drugs and addiction that set her back, as she tries to create a better life for herself and her daughter. She moves with her daughter to Paris after the events of the third season. In season 4 she is kidnapped by Joe in London. In season 5 she returns to seek revenge.
- Shalita Grant as Sherry Conrad (season 3, special appearance season 5), a locally famous "momfluencer", admired by her social media followers for her well crafted persona, she often insults people through veiled insults and sees herself as superior to everyone in Madre Linda. She is very fake and only seeks things that support her personal interests.
- Travis Van Winkle as Cary Conrad (season 3, special appearance season 5), a wealthy, charismatic, and self-proclaimed founder who runs his own supplement company and is married to Sherry with whom they share twin girls
- Dylan Arnold as Theo Engler (season 3), (Note: Arnold is credited as a series regular for episodes 2 through 10 of the third season.) a troubled college student who has a strained relationship with his stepfather, Matthew Engler, and who has a crush on Love and brief romantic encounter
- Charlotte Ritchie as Kate Galvin-Lockwood (seasons 4–5), a fearsomely intelligent art gallery director. Her partying boyfriend Malcolm will bring Joe into their lives.
- Tilly Keeper as Lady Phoebe Borehall-Blaxworth (season 4, guest season 5), a wealthy social media influencer who is part of the royal family. She is romantically involved with Adam and has a dramatic yet bubbly personality.
- Amy-Leigh Hickman as Nadia Farran/Fareedi (season 4, recurring season 5), one of Joe's students in London. She is outspoken and competitive, and a lover of genre fiction. He later frames her, and she returns in season 5, seeking revenge.
- Ed Speleers as Rhys Montrose (season 4), (Note: Speleers also portrays the inner voice of Joe Goldberg.) an author and mayoral hopeful whose memoir about his experiences in prison lifted him out of poverty. He appears to quickly form a connection with Joe over their similar personal backgrounds.
- Lukas Gage as Adam Pratt (season 4), (Note: Gage is credited as a series regular for episodes 1 through 9 of the fourth season.) an American playboy who hails from a wealthy family and owns Sundry House, an elite London social club. He is dating Lady Phoebe and has a strained relationship with his father, who he typically consults to bail him out of debt from his failed business ventures.
- Madeline Brewer as Bronte / Louise Flannery (season 5), an enigmatic and free-spirited playwright who comes to work for Joe, who has a history with Beck; she is easily manipulated by Joe and falls for him
- Anna Camp in a dual role as identical twins:
  - Raegan Lockwood (season 5), a cutthroat CFO of the Lockwood Corp who has her eyes on the throne and hates her sister Kate and frequently bullies her twin Maddie
  - Maddie Lockwood (season 5), a thrice-divorced socialite and master manipulator whose job is "vaguely PR"; she resents Raegan for making her be her surrogate
- Griffin Matthews as Teddy Lockwood (season 5), a snarky yet loyal brother-in-law of Joe, who was the secret child of Kate's father's "help" who was never fully accepted by the Lockwood family apart from Kate who brings him into the family business

== Episodes ==
Season	Episodes		Originally released		
Season	Episodes		First released	Last released	Network
1	10		September 9, 2018	November 11, 2018	Lifetime
2	10		December 26, 2019		Netflix
3	10		October 15, 2021		Netflix
4	10	5	February 9, 2023		Netflix
4	10	5	March 9, 2023		Netflix
5	10		April 24, 2025		Netflix

=== Season 1 (2018) ===
No. overall	No. in season	Title	Directed by	Written by	Original release date	U.S. viewers (millions)
1	1	"Pilot"	Lee Toland Krieger	Greg Berlanti & Sera Gamble	September 9, 2018	0.82
2	2	"The Last Nice Guy in New York"	Lee Toland Krieger	Sera Gamble	September 16, 2018	0.77
3	3	"Maybe"	Marcos Siega	April Blair	September 23, 2018	0.57
4	4	"The Captain"	Vic Mahoney	Michael Foley	September 30, 2018	0.56
5	5	"Living with the Enemy"	Marta Cunningham	Neil Reynolds	October 7, 2018	0.57
6	6	"Amour Fou"	Marcos Siega	Adria Lang	October 14, 2018	0.71
7	7	"Everythingship"	Kellie Cyrus	April Blair & Amanda Zetterström	October 21, 2018	0.62
8	8	"You Got Me, Babe"	Erin Feeley	Caroline Kepnes	October 28, 2018	0.49
9	9	"Candace"	Martha Mitchell	Kelli Breslin & Michael Foley	November 4, 2018	0.47
10	10	"Bluebeard's Castle"	Marcos Siega	Sera Gamble & Neil Reynolds	November 11, 2018	0.53

=== Season 2 (2019) ===
No. overall	No. in season	Title	Directed by	Written by	Original release date
11	1	"A Fresh Start"	Kevin Rodney Sullivan	Sera Gamble	December 26, 2019
12	2	"Just the Tip"	Silver Tree	Michael Foley	December 26, 2019
13	3	"What Are Friends For?"	John Scott	Neil Reynolds	December 26, 2019
14	4	"The Good, the Bad, & the Hendy"	DeMane Davis	Justin W. Lo	December 26, 2019
15	5	"Have a Good Wellkend, Joe!"	Cherie Nowlan	Amanda Johnson-Zetterström	December 26, 2019
16	6	"Farewell, My Bunny"	Meera Menon	Adria Lang	December 26, 2019
17	7	"Ex-istential Crisis"	Shannon Kohli	Kelli Breslin	December 26, 2019
18	8	"Fear and Loathing in Beverly Hills"	Harry Jierjian	Kara Lee Corthron & Justin W. Lo	December 26, 2019
19	9	"P.I. Joe"	Silver Tree	Michael Foley & Mairin Reed	December 26, 2019
20	10	"Love, Actually"	Silver Tree	Sera Gamble & Neil Reynolds	December 26, 2019

=== Season 3 (2021) ===
No. overall	No. in season	Title	Directed by	Written by	Original release date
21	1	"And They Lived Happily Ever After"	Silver Tree	Sera Gamble & Mairin Reed	October 15, 2021
22	2	"So I Married an Axe Murderer"	Silver Tree	Neil Reynolds & Kelli Breslin	October 15, 2021
23	3	"Missing White Woman Syndrome"	John Scott	Kara Lee Corthron & Justin W. Lo	October 15, 2021
24	4	"Hands Across Madre Linda"	John Scott	Hillary Benefiel & Michael Foley	October 15, 2021
25	5	"Into the Woods"	Silver Tree	Mairin Reed & Amanda Johnson-Zetterström	October 15, 2021
26	6	"W.O.M.B."	Silver Tree	Kelli Breslin & Kara Lee Corthron	October 15, 2021
27	7	"We're All Mad Here"	Pete Chatmon	Justin W. Lo & Amanda Johnson-Zetterström	October 15, 2021
28	8	"Swing and a Miss"	Pete Chatmon	AB Chao & Dylan Cohen	October 15, 2021
29	9	"Red Flag"	Sasha Alexander	Michael Foley & Hillary Benefiel	October 15, 2021
30	10	"What Is Love?"	Silver Tree	Sera Gamble & Neil Reynolds	October 15, 2021

=== Season 4 (2023) ===
No. overall	No. in season	Title	Directed by	Written by	Original release date
Part 1
31	1	"Joe Takes a Holiday"	John Scott	Sera Gamble & Leo Richardson	February 9, 2023
32	2	"Portrait of the Artist"	John Scott	Kara Lee Corthron & Neil Reynolds	February 9, 2023
33	3	"Eat the Rich"	Shamim Sarif	Justin W. Lo & Mairin Reed	February 9, 2023
34	4	"Hampsie"	Harry Jierjian	Michael Foley & Amanda Johnson-Zetterström	February 9, 2023
35	5	"The Fox and the Hound"	Harry Jierjian	Hillary Benefiel & Dylan Cohen	February 9, 2023
Part 2
36	6	"Best of Friends"	John Scott	Justin W. Lo & Leo Richardson	March 9, 2023
37	7	"Good Man, Cruel World"	Rachel Leiterman	Ab Chao & Neil Reynolds	March 9, 2023
38	8	"Where Are You Going, Where Have You Been?"	Rachel Leiterman	Kara Lee Corthron & Mairin Reed	March 9, 2023
39	9	"She's Not There"	Penn Badgley	Hillary Benefiel & Amanda Johnson-Zetterström	March 9, 2023
40	10	"The Death of Jonathan Moore"	Harry Jierjian	Michael Foley & Sera Gamble	March 9, 2023

=== Season 5 (2025) ===
No. overall	No. in season	Title	Directed by	Written by	Original release date
41	1	"The Luckiest Guy in NY"	Marcos Siega	Michael Foley & Hillary Benefiel	April 24, 2025
42	2	"Blood Will Have Blood"	Marcos Siega	Justin W. Lo & Kelli Breslin	April 24, 2025
43	3	"Impostor Syndrome"	Pete Chatmon	Neil Reynolds & Maren Caldwell	April 24, 2025
44	4	"My Fair Maddie"	So Yong Kim	Kara Lee Corthron & Dylan Cohen	April 24, 2025
45	5	"Last Dance"	Maggie Carey	Amanda Johnson-Zetterström	April 24, 2025
46	6	"The Dark Face of Love"	Gaby Dellal	Hillary Benefiel	April 24, 2025
47	7	"#JoeGoldberg"	Erica Dunton	Leo Richardson	April 24, 2025
48	8	"Folie a Deux"	Cheryl Dunye	Kelli Breslin	April 24, 2025
49	9	"Trial of the Furies"	Marcos Siega	Justin W. Lo & Hillary Benefiel	April 24, 2025
50	10	"Finale"	Lee Toland Krieger	Michael Foley & Neil Reynolds	April 24, 2025

== Production ==
=== Development ===
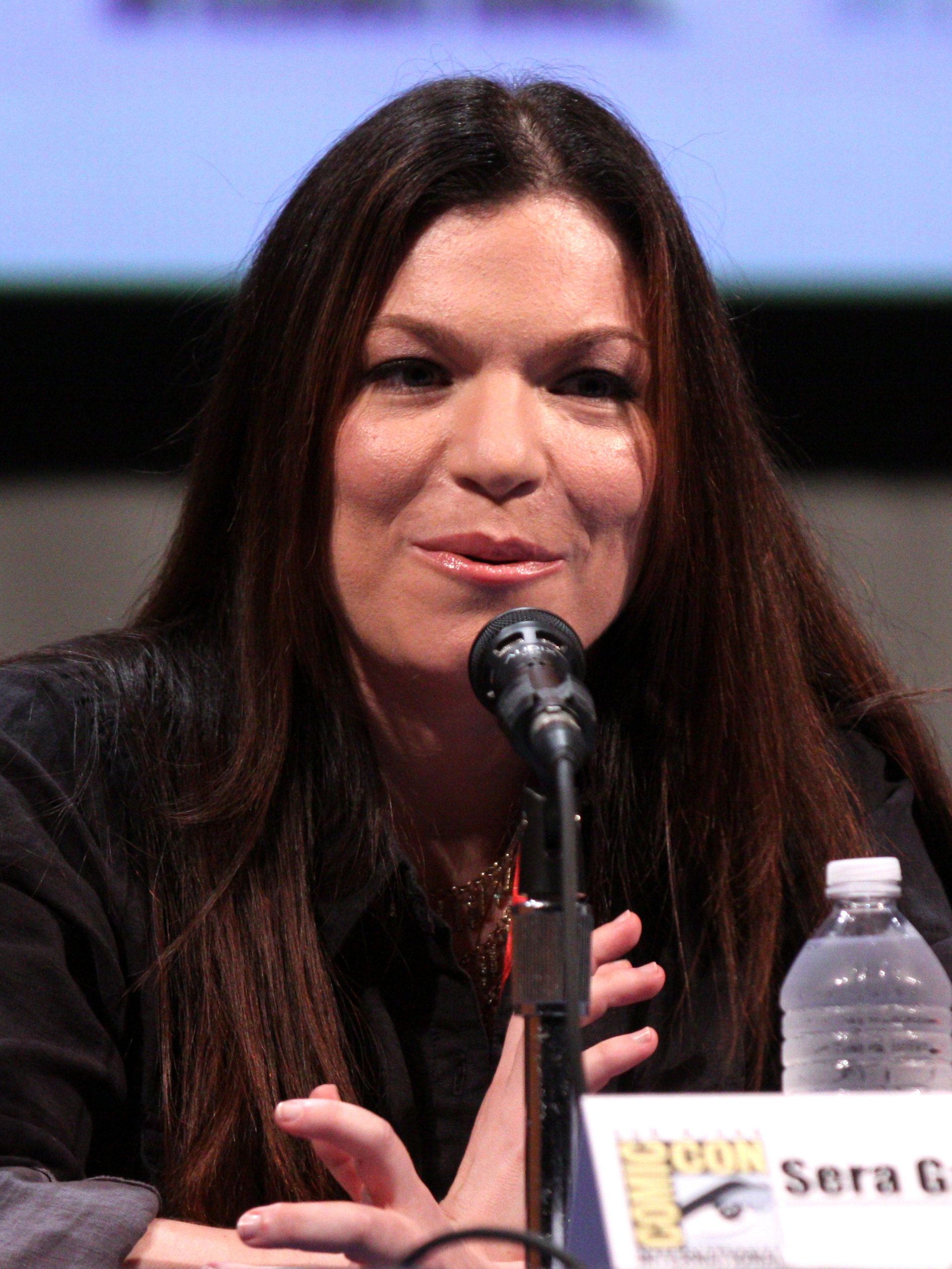
Sera Gamble, the co-creator and showrunner of You

In February 2015, it was announced that Greg Berlanti and Sera Gamble would develop a series based on Caroline Kepnes' book You with Berlanti and Gamble as the scriptwriters, and Berlanti as the pilot director. Initially, Berlanti and Gamble pitched the show to Showtime but were unsuccessful in their attempts. In addition, both creators had also originally pitched the series to Netflix but were declined twice, prior to Netflix's head of international non-English originals, Bela Bajaria joining the company in late 2016. Berlanti recounted his experience of pitching the show to Netflix in an interview with Entertainment Weekly, stating that You "felt like more of a binge show". He further added that his team "tried initially to sell it to Netflix at the very beginning and [Netflix's chief content officer] Ted Sarandos has said as much that they wish they'd gotten it the first time".

In January 2017, it was announced that the series had been purchased by Lifetime and put into fast-track development. In April 2017, Lifetime gave You a 10-episode straight-to-series order. On July 26, 2018, ahead of the series premiere, Lifetime announced that the series had been renewed for a second season.

In November 2018, Gamble confirmed that like Hidden Bodies, the sequel novel to You, the setting of the series would move to Los Angeles for the second season. On December 3, 2018, it was confirmed that Lifetime had rescinded its renewal of the series and that Netflix had picked up You ahead of the release of the second season. On January 14, 2020, Netflix renewed the series for a 10-episode third season. On October 13, 2021, ahead of the third-season premiere, Netflix renewed the series for a fourth season. On March 24, 2023, the series was renewed for a fifth and final season, initially set to release in 2024. However, journalists predicted delays, as the 2023 Writers Guild of America and SAG-AFTRA strikes delayed the season's scripting and production schedules.

In March 2019, Berlanti discussed the challenges of finding the right platform for the series in a panel interview. Speaking at the INTV conference, he stated that "we pitched [You] and sold it to Showtime of all places, but…once they read the script, they were really cool about saying, 'You can take it somewhere else'...". After being turned down by the network, he later pitched the show to Lifetime, who "wanted to make it, and we shot it, and because of their launch cycle it sat in the can for a while for two-and-a-half years. Then they finally started to release it, and it didn't do very well." Although, Lifetime reneged on their initial renewal offer for a second season in late 2018, Berlanti recalled that he went to the offices of the network executives to plead them to change their mind, asking "I still think it's going to work, I still think it's going to work – maybe one more episode, maybe if people have a chance to see five more episodes." Later, he was relieved by the news of Netflix's guarantee of committing to a second season after Lifetime canceled the series.

Following Netflix's reportings on the considerable success that You obtained after it was made available to stream on their platform service, Penn Badgley wrote in an email response to The Washington Post that "We're grateful to Lifetime for being the gateway to getting the show made. We wouldn't have been able to make the show without them, as far as I can tell. There is no sense of bewilderment that the show had one reaction while it was on Lifetime and another when it went to Netflix. The difference in viewership is obvious, and it's indicative of so many different things, not the least of which is the way young people consume media."

=== Casting ===
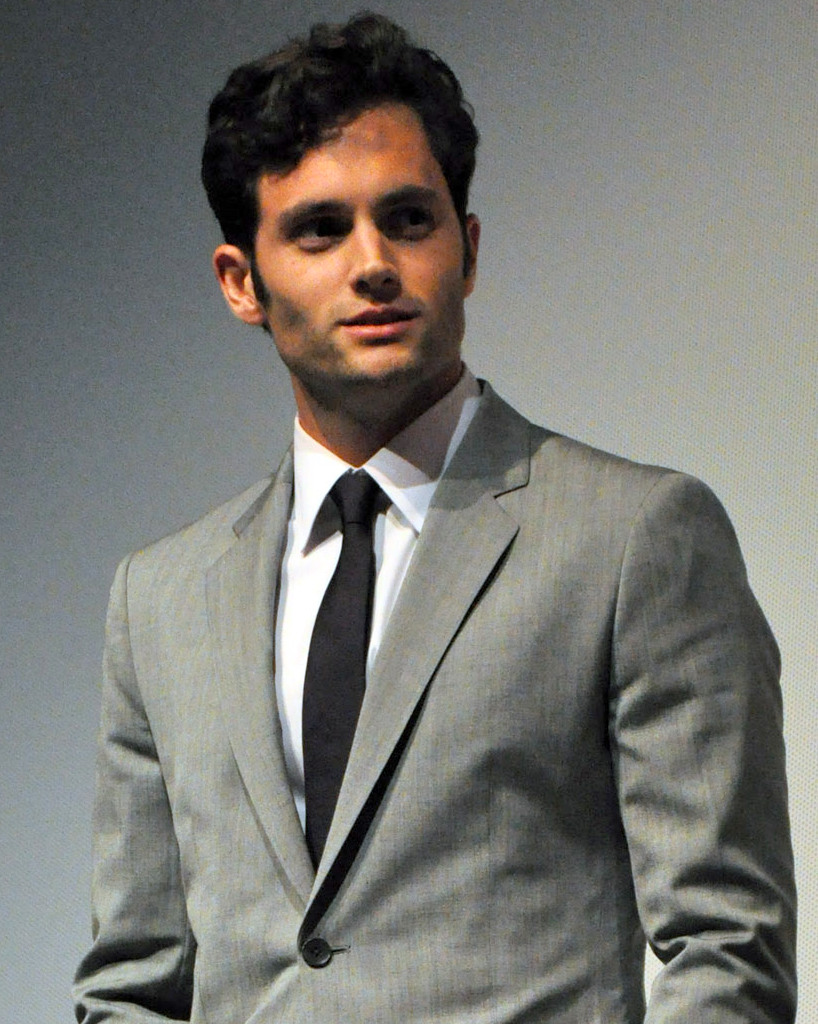
Penn Badgley plays series lead Joe Goldberg.

Penn Badgley was cast as lead character Joe Goldberg in June 2017. Elizabeth Lail's casting as Guinevere Beck was announced in July 2017, as well as Luca Padovan as Joe's neighbor Paco, and Zach Cherry as Ethan, a bookstore clerk who works with Joe. Shay Mitchell was cast as Peach Salinger, Beck's wealthy best friend, in August 2017.

In September 2017, Hari Nef was cast in the recurring role as Blythe, a talented and competitive peer in Beck's MFA program. A few days later it was announced that Daniel Cosgrove had been cast in the recurring role of Ron, a correctional officer. In October 2017, Michael Maize and Ambyr Childers were cast in the recurring roles of Officer Nico and Candace, respectively. It was announced in November 2017 that John Stamos would recur as Dr. Nicky, Beck's therapist.

On January 30, 2019, it was announced that Victoria Pedretti had been cast in the main role of Love Quinn for the second season. Pedretti had originally auditioned for the role of Guinevere Beck prior to the filming of the first season in 2017. Though the part later went to Lail, Pedretti was cast in the following season after the showrunners saw the actress's performance in Netflix's The Haunting of Hill House and the casting directors liked her chemistry with Badgley. On January 31, 2019, James Scully was cast in a main role as Forty Quinn, Love's brother, and Jenna Ortega was also cast in a main role as Ellie Alves.

On February 1, 2019, Deadline Hollywood reported that Ambyr Childers had been promoted to a series regular role, ahead of the premiere of the second season. On February 6, 2019, Adwin Brown was cast in the recurring role of Calvin on the second season. On February 15, 2019, Robin Lord Taylor was cast in the recurring role of Will on the second season. On February 21, 2019, Carmela Zumbado was cast in the series regular role of Delilah Alves on the second season. On March 4, 2019, it was reported that Marielle Scott has been cast in the recurring role of Lucy on the second season. On March 5, 2019, Chris D'Elia was cast in the recurring role of Henderson on the second season. On March 26, 2019, Charlie Barnett was cast in the recurring role of Gabe on the second season. On April 4, 2019, Melanie Field and Magda Apanowicz were cast in recurring roles as Sunrise and Sandy, respectively. On June 4, 2019, Danny Vasquez had been cast in a recurring role. On June 24, 2019, it was confirmed that John Stamos would reprise his role as Dr. Nicky in the second season. On October 17, 2019, Elizabeth Lail confirmed in a Build Series interview that she would reprise her role as Guinevere Beck in a guest appearance on the second season.

In October 2020, Travis Van Winkle and Shalita Grant were cast as series regulars while Scott Speedman was cast in a recurring role for the third season. In November 2020, it was announced that Saffron Burrows was upped to regular status after recurring in the second season. Additionally, Tati Gabrielle and Dylan Arnold were also cast as series regulars for the third season, with Michaela McManus, Shannon Chan-Kent, Ben Mehl, Christopher O'Shea, Christopher Sean, Bryan Safi, Mackenzie Astin, Ayelet Zurer, Jack Fisher, and Mauricio Lara added as recurring cast members. On January 25, 2021, Scott Michael Foster joined the cast in a recurring role for the third season. On April 15, 2021, it was confirmed that John Stamos would not be returning in the third season.

In February 2022, Lukas Gage was cast as a series regular for the fourth season. In March 2022, Charlotte Ritchie was cast as a series regular for the fourth season. In April 2022, Tilly Keeper, Amy Leigh Hickman, and Ed Speleers were cast as new series regulars while Niccy Lin, Aidan Cheng, Stephen Hagan, Ben Wiggins, Eve Austin, Ozioma Whenu, Dario Coates, Sean Pertwee, Brad Alexander, Alison Pargeter, and Adam James joined the cast in recurring roles for the fourth season.

In March 2024, Madeline Brewer, Anna Camp and Griffin Matthews were cast as series regulars for the fifth season.

=== Filming ===
The first season of You was filmed in New York City and filming concluded on December 19, 2017. For the second season, the series relocated its production to California to take advantage of tax incentives provided by the California Film Commission under its "Program 2.0" initiative.

Filming for the second season took place on location in Los Angeles, California, from February 2019 to June 2019.

For the third season, the series was awarded $7.2 million in tax credits by the state of California. Filming for the third season began on November 2, 2020, and was originally scheduled to conclude in April 2021. On December 31, 2020, production of the third season was paused for two weeks due to the COVID-19 pandemic. Filming resumed in February 2021 and ended in April 2021.

Filming on the fourth season officially began on March 21, 2022, in London, and ended on August 27, 2022. The London filming locations included Royal Holloway, South Kensington, Grant's Quay Wharf in Old Billingsgate, Lincoln's Inn Library, Knebworth House and St. Pancras Station. Badgley made his directorial debut with the ninth episode of the season.

Filming for the fifth season began in late March 2024, and ended in August 2024.

=== Technical aspects ===
Lee Toland Krieger and David Lanzenberg were both credited as the director and cinematographer for the first two episodes, respectively. Since then, the series has had a number of cinematographers and directors. Krieger and Lanzenberg were inspired by the works of cinematographer Darius Khondji in films such as David Fincher's Seven (1995) and Woody Allen's Midnight in Paris (2011).

As part of creating the striking look for the series, they executed various dolly shots and used anamorphic lenses to evoke a level of surrealistic voyeurism, demanding from the viewer their participation in the romantic manifestations of Joe's worldview. Krieger asserted that in order to sell Joe's character to the audience, he needed to craft You with a certain visual look and mood, slightly different, unconventional and accented than the standard color palette and tone for contemporary thrillers. He stated that "I wanted something that felt like a great New York love story, just with a very disturbed protagonist", adding that "The show opens with these luscious slow-motion shots. There's that amber glow. It doesn't feel like a thriller."

For the second season, the setting change from New York to Los Angeles, entailed a distinctive use of saturated hues and colorful warm lighting, in part to contrast and depict an alteration of Joe's perspective of a new city which he had never visited previously. It would also signal a period in which Joe could find an avenue for encountering newer opportunities for a fresh start. In a Variety interview with the lead showrunner, Gamble noted the change, stating that "If you went straight from Season 1 to Season 2, you'll notice the sun-drenched color palette. There's something creamier about the light in L.A. than Season 1."

== Release ==
The official trailer for You was released on April 10, 2018, by Lifetime. You premiered on Lifetime in the United States on September 9, 2018. In May 2018, it was announced that Netflix acquired the exclusive international broadcast rights to You, making it available as an original series on the platform. On December 3, 2018, it was announced that Lifetime had passed on the second season, and that the series would move to Netflix as a global Netflix Original series. The first season became available to stream instantly on Netflix worldwide on December 26, 2018. The first season was released on DVD as a manufacture-on-demand title by Warner Archive Collection on January 14, 2020. On December 5, 2019, a teaser trailer for the second season was released by Netflix. On December 16, 2019, the official trailer for the second season was released. The second season was released on December 26, 2019. The second season was released on DVD on January 26, 2021. As part of a video and letter to its shareholders in April 2021, Netflix's co-chief executive officer and chief content officer, Ted Sarandos confirmed that the third season of You is expected to premiere sometime in the fourth quarter of 2021. On August 30, 2021, Netflix announced that the third season will premiere on October 15, 2021. On September 17, 2021, the official trailer for the third season was released. The fourth season was slated to be split into two parts. The first part of the fourth season premiered on February 9, 2023, and the second part premiered on March 9. The fifth season premiered on Netflix on April 24, 2025.

=== Marketing ===
Teasing the original premiere on Lifetime on September 9, 2018, the main cast, Penn Badgley, Elizabeth Lail and Shay Mitchell, as well as the show creator, Sera Gamble, and author of the original book, Caroline Kepnes, sat down with Build Series, a YouTube talk show meant to promote new buzzworthy shows and movies.

Before the show's premiere, Badgley mentioned his disinterest in playing the character of Joe Goldberg in an interview with Entertainment Weekly, saying that "I didn't want to do it — it was too much. I was conflicted with the nature of the role. If this is a love story, what is it saying? It's not an average show; it's a social experiment." However, he was strongly convinced by the script and the social commentary around the series, adding that "what was key in me wanting to jump on board were my conversations with Greg Berlanti and Sera Gamble, the creators, and understanding Joe's humanity. I knew that I would be conflicted about the role from day one till the last day, and that is why they thought I would be good for it, is that I'm not psyched to play somebody of this nature."

Relaying similar thoughts in an interview with GQ, Badgley again raised his concerns of portraying Joe, noting that he was first apprehensive at the role but later, changed his mind, expressing that "no one in any position of authority could ever try to act as though we don't know that sex and murder sells, but how can it work in a different way we've not seen? That's where I think this show does something that none of us could have said for certain that we would nail. It could have been really irresponsible. It could have fallen flat and been like, whoa." In another interview at The Contenders Emmys 2019 panel, Badgley mentioned that his character was "the hero of his own story...every serial killer is" but added that Joe is "ultimately, the word that's coming to mind is un-saveable". The actor highlighted that though, there is an apparent affinity to Joe's character, it is somewhat of a "Rorschach test of a kind for us," adding that "we're failing. . ." In an interview with TheWrap, Badgley was asked about whether his approach to portraying Joe over the course of the second season had shifted from the previous season. Badgley stated in response that playing Joe was still an "isolating" experience, but admitted that he was surprised by "how deep of a metaphor we're working with this guy". Nonetheless, he stressed that the incredible range of responses from audiences that followed from portraying "such a damaged, traumatized person", who is "awful and blind and abusive", allowed for "more meaningful conversations about the themes that the show is working" to be discussed in the public sphere.

Various critics gave praise to the series, by complimenting its eerie tone and terrifying approach to the themes of violence and stalking, reminiscent of contemporary thriller films and series like Dexter, Gone Girl and American Psycho. Certain reviewers highlighted that You provides an alluring but disturbing insight into the mind and profile of a psychopath, who charmingly manipulates – through his anti-hero charisma, motives and warped sense of morality – the audience into "[sympathizing] with a stalker" and "serial killer".

The marketing for the series used the buzz around the #MeToo Movement to gain attention to the start of the show. You has been said to have been "tailor-made for the #MeToo Era." One of the show creators, Sera Gamble, commented on this era by highlighting that in contemporary culture, attention is almost unanimously given to the perspective of the male and his story, so naturally he is positioned through the lens of a hero. She states "We're focused on their story, their triumph, their downfall, their redemption arc ... So I doubt the show will single-handedly change the way we think about dudes and our culture, but I'm happy to be part of the conversation."

== Themes ==
=== Obsessive love and violence ===
You explores the psychodynamic view of erotomania and obsessive love between Joe and his romantic interests. In addition, the series further raises questions on the ethics and potential implications of manipulating circumstances and how the psychology of stalking, murder and violence is best exemplified by Joe's intrusive and insidious actions, to manufacture the constructs of an idealized love relationship.

Sera Gamble, the showrunner and co-creator of the series, stated in an interview with Collider, that when envisioning Joe, the main protagonist of the series, she wanted to delve deeply into the root cause of the pathology of his behavior that shaped his amoral position to justify and rationalize stalking, kidnapping and killing his victims. When she was writing the character, she stated that "I want to understand what coaxes behavior of this nature out of that very tiny percentage of men. I like to think it's a very tiny percentage of men who would cross a line like the line that Joe Goldberg crosses".

In an interview at The Contenders Emmys 2019 panel, Gamble highlighted the importance of casting the right person to play the role of Joe Goldberg. She stated that "it had to be a love story and a horror movie in every single scene", further adding that if they "cast someone who was sort of creepy, then the story wouldn't work; the idea is that it's a lead in a romantic comedy who works in a bookstore and a woman walks in, they have a cute meet and fall in love and live happily ever after. That's the show." Expanding on her commentary on the show's themes and origin, Gamble stated at The Hollywood Reporter's roundtable interview, that she was not surprised to hear an overwhelming reception to Joe's character amongst online fans and viewers, citing that "There's a very vocal contingent of fans of Caroline Kepnes' book [on which You is based] who were like, "I heart Joe." Essentially what she's done is taken the classic romantic hero and just peeled back the gloss and sheen and John Cusack with the boombox and she followed it to its logical conclusion. I mean, if you turn off the sappy music and turn on a David Fincher score, romantic comedies are stalker movies. The plot of pretty much every one I can think of — and we have watched all of them many times in the writers room — is contingent on the guy ... well, first of all, he has to do a certain amount of fucking up so she can forgive him. And he has to get over some of her shortcomings. I mean, that's love, right? But also, he's chasing her through a fucking airport, chasing her on a freeway, watching her sleep because he feels protective. Romantic comedy behavior in real life is criminal! And that was basically the starting place for the show."

After the series was acquired by Netflix, Gamble noted in several interviews on the changes that would occur in the following season. In an interview with New Musical Express, Gamble highlighted that an exploration of Joe's descent in future storylines will further necessitate a focus on underlying issues that inform his skewed worldview. She later added that "We're interested in exploring the character and we're well aware that what the character is doing is not ok – it's deeply, deeply problematic. So what's interesting to us is: what does he think he's done wrong, what does he think he has to do differently, and to really explore that while still keeping that clinical cold eye on the whole show. And that eye is on a show that's about a guy who kills people." Given the hands off approach that Netflix is known for, Gamble added in an interview with The New York Times that the second season will be different, explaining that "Certain things are changing in the way we are thinking about Season 2 of You. We have a little more flexibility around timing, since we don't have commercial ads, and also we can say the word [expletive] a lot more. As someone who swears a lot, that's a great thing. Netflix lets you give as many [expletive] as you want." In an interview with LadBible, Gamble declared that the team's approach to writing the second season would necessitate a change in the formula, noting that "We knew that it wouldn't be possible to repeat it as the audience is very much onto Joe now and will see through him". Furthermore, she highlighted that the second season will be "gorier and scarier than anything we had in season one."

The theme of obsession and violence is significantly expanded upon in the second season with the introduction of the character of Love Quinn. The examination and deconstruction of the Manic Pixie Dream Girl and Cool Girl tropes enabled the writers to express the idea that certain women such as Love harbor internalized misogyny through actions that either minimize or question the lived experiences of female victims in favor of men that they are romantically inclined to. The balance of such an approach in emotional conflict poses an interesting dilemma for the viewer, where sympathy is later garnered for Love's perspective due to her complicated history, underlying motives in manifesting the goal of attaining her idealized soulmate, and the tension between her perceived image against Joe's mental projection of a conceptualized fantasy girl.

The bottomless nature of Joe's obsession becomes very apparent in season three, when Joe—despite finally having found a partner who accepts and loves him exactly as he is—cannot help but fixate on women outside of his marriage.

Season three also presents a foil for Joe's approach to relationships: Love's married friends, Sherry and Cary, although introduced as performative and condescending, ultimately demonstrate healthy communication and teamwork. In an interview with Elle, showrunner Sera Gamble said, "It became important to us to have a married couple in the season who also went through a real crucible in their relationship, so that we could actually hold somebody up and say this is what it looks like when it's good. This is what it looks like when people listen to each other and they are truly putting each other's interests at the forefront of their consciousness."

=== Addiction ===
Addiction is featured prominently in the show, with a particular emphasis on the impact of addiction on loved ones. In season one, Joe shields a younger neighbor from the consequences of his mother's addiction and helps her through withdrawal. In season two, Love's brother Forty deals with recovery, and the show deepens its exploration by focusing on Love's co-dependent need to guide Forty through his issues. Season three's love interest, Marienne, is also recovering addict.

Joe often compares his own erotomania and psychopathy to substance abuse. He constantly attempts, seemingly genuinely, to stop stalking and killing, but almost always finds a way to justify his own actions.

=== Privacy ===
As the first season of You is situated in modern-day New York City, it explores the dangers of stalking and social media culture with an emphasis on a lack of digital privacy. The author of the novel, Caroline Kepnes, explained the darkness of You, which deconstructs the romantic-comedy tropes highlighted in many films and shows, by making the protagonist a violent stalker and serial killer, saying it was written in a dark period of her life, the year her father died of cancer, and in which she experienced several other personal challenges. She further stated that her inspiration for the novel grew out of her moving back to LA. She expressed that when she moved, she noticed that "suddenly everyone was following each other and being followed, and I always thought of that as such a negative thing," soon creating Joe in her mind as a very real possibility of what can happen with that type of access into people's lives. After the series premiered, Kepnes mentioned in an interview with Emily Baker from iNews, that she was initially hesitant on labeling Joe, as a few readers argued that his actions, classified him as a serial killer. The author then, clarified her position on the matter, citing that "I remember when I wrote You and someone first referred to Joe as a serial killer. I argued 'he's not a serial killer, he meets these terrible people and has these awful thoughts, but he's very sensitive. It's very strange to realize you have written a serial killer."

Due to narrative changes, the second season would necessitate a shift in setting to Los Angeles from the prior season. As a result, Gamble noted in an interview with Entertainment Weekly that the season will have a different feeling, citing that "Los Angeles is full of people who are really trying to live their best life and self-actualize," and that "When you put somebody who needs a lot of healing into a city that advertises itself basically as this Mecca full of cutting-edge healers, the alchemy is a little unexpected for him." She further added, that there will be more deviations in the ongoing story compared to Kepnes' sequel novel Hidden Bodies but stressed that some plot elements will still be adapted in the second season. Speaking in an interview with Vogue, the showrunner explained that the second season, offered an opportunity for the writers to satirize and dig beneath the Hollywood scene, influencer lifestyle and wellness culture that permeates the surface of Los Angeles. Though, Gamble mentioned that it was imperative to balance the pokes at L.A. culture by representing a different side to the city, citing that "I think when you squint at it from far away, it seems like a city that's sprung up around the entertainment business which is technically true to a certain extent, but a lot of the portrayal of LA that people have seen in stuff like Entourage... and what you see in tabloids, where you think it's all famous people running around to their plastic surgeon and in BMWs, and that's actually a very small slice of a city that's this vast patchwork of neighbourhoods. We're all very lucky that Hollywood is here because it's paying our bills... the reach of Hollywood is vast... but people have much fuller, deeper more expansive lives than that, once you're here." In an interview with Boston Herald, Gamble stated that "Joe will always have biting thoughts about other people," further highlighting that "so it's fun to drop him into an environment that gives him a lot of fodder. He had judgments about the crowd in New York, and he also does about the crowd around him in L.A. And since we [the show's creative team] all live in Los Angeles, that's a lot of fun for us. We're really excited to do the other side of the coin."

=== Privilege ===
In each of the show's settings, privilege—especially class—plays a prominent role. Most of Joe's love interests have ties to the rich and powerful, and Joe regularly comments on this upper-class culture with disdain.

Season one primarily focuses on socialite and influencer culture in New York City, as well as the pressure of "old money". Season two hones in on influencer culture, but also explores celebrity and what critic Rebecca Nicholson described as LA's "hippy-adjacent ultracapitalist spiritualism".

Season three continues to explore class and influencer culture. The "crunchy" parenting in Madre Linda also serves as commentary on the anti-vax movement, a theme that proved especially timely when the show premiered after the COVID-19 pandemic (though the episode was actually written before the pandemic). The introduction of a Black love interest (Marienne) enabled the show to comment on the "missing white woman" trope and the disproportionate attention white victims get compared to women of color.

Season four's London setting involves a string of "eat-the-rich" killings targeting the wealthy social elite, including a member of the British royal family. Joe's love interest is his wealthiest yet—Kate is the heir to a billion-dollar military contracting company, and openly comments on the shame she feels for being connected to the military-industrial complex.

=== Mentorship and parenthood ===
In each season, Joe has a younger person he looks after and attempts to protect. In season one, Joe looks after a young neighbor (Paco) whose home life is very similar to his own experiences as a child—an absentee mother and a violent, drunk father figure. Joe's takes on a mentor role in Paco's life, reflecting the role of Mr. Mooney in his own childhood—a man who cared for him, but whose violent actions shaped Joe's moral views about violence.

The third season takes place in suburban California, as Joe and Love Quinn-Goldberg raise a newborn baby together. The season explores the toll of parenthood on both Joe and Love. Joe's experience with parenthood in season three builds upon his backstory, introduced in season one and developed in season two. His absentee mother, violent father, and abusive mentor contribute to the pressure he feels about fatherhood. He expresses deep concern that his son will end up like him.

In an interview with Elle, Victoria Pedretti said, "She's allowing these relationships outside of herself to give her a sense of purpose. Including having a child. Instead of finding and being driven by a sense of security and purpose within herself, she gains value from these things instead of seeing herself as enough, just as is. I think she and Joe both struggle with this. (...) It's like a product of the trauma they experience as children, and they've never learned to find value outside of themselves, and so will aspire and become greedy and try to fill this never ending void." In the same Elle interview, Pedretti discussed how the suburban California setting puts Love into positions where she is expected to perform perfection as a mother and as a wife: "She has this need to represent herself as secure because she knows that being too insecure does come off as unattractive."

== Reception and impact ==
=== Audience viewership ===
On January 17, 2019, Netflix announced that the series was on track to be streamed by over 40 million viewers within its first month of release on the streaming platform. On December 13, 2019, Netflix announced over 43 million viewers had completed watching the whole season since its release on the service. On December 30, 2019, Netflix issued a number of official lists, including the Most Popular TV Shows of 2019. The series was among the most viewed in the U.S. market, where You was ranked fifth among series. On January 21, 2020, Netflix announced that the second season had been viewed by over 54 million viewers on its service within its first month of release, referring to viewers who had watched at least 2 minutes of one episode. According to the year-end summary from Nielsen, You was in the group of top ten most-watched original series in the U.S. market between December 30, 2019, through December 27, 2020, where it ranked tenth based on minutes watched, with a 10.96 billion total minutes of streaming.

=== Critical response ===
Critical response of You
Season	Rotten Tomatoes	Metacritic
1	93% (60 reviews)	74 (29 reviews)
2	87% (45 reviews)	74 (17 reviews)
3	96% (53 reviews)	77 (13 reviews)
4	92% (53 reviews)	73 (20 reviews)
4B	—N/a	82 (8 reviews)
5	82% (39 reviews)	53 (12 reviews)

==== Season 1 ====
On the review aggregator website, Rotten Tomatoes, the first season has a 93% approval rating with 60 reviews, with an average rating of 7.10/10. The website's critical consensus reads, "You pairs thrilling drama with trashy fun to create an addictive social media horror story that works its way under the skin – and stays there." Review aggregator Metacritic gave the first season a score of 74 out of 100 based on 29 critics, indicating "generally favorable" reviews.

==== Season 2 ====
On Rotten Tomatoes, the second season has an 87% approval rating with an average rating of 8.01/10, based on 45 reviews. The website's critical consensus reads, "Penn Badgley's perversely endearing serial stalker keeps looking for love in all the wrong places during a second season that maintains the subversive tension while adding some welcome variations on the series' formula." On Metacritic, the second season has a weighted average score of 74 out of 100, based on 17 critics, indicating "generally favorable" reviews.

==== Season 3 ====
On Rotten Tomatoes, the third season holds a 96% approval rating with an average rating of 8.00/10 based on 53 reviews. The website's critics consensus reads, "You takes its thrilling saga to the suburbs with superb results, made all the more delicious by Penn Badgley and Victoria Pedretti's committed performances." On Metacritic, the third season has a weighted average score of 77 out of 100, based on 13 critics, indicating "generally favorable" reviews.

==== Season 4 ====
The fourth season has an approval rating of 92% on Rotten Tomatoes, based on 53 reviews, with an average rating of 7.3/10. The website's critics consensus states, "The hunter becomes prey in You's London-set fourth season, which shows some wear as this premise begins to outlive its believability—but Penn Badgley's sardonic performance continues to paper over most lapses in logic." On Metacritic, the first part of the fourth season received a score of 73 based on reviews from 20 critics, indicating "generally favorable" reviews. For the second part of season 4, Metacritic, which uses a weighted average, assigned a score of 82 out of 100 based on 8 critics, indicating "universal acclaim".

==== Season 5 ====
On Rotten Tomatoes, the fifth season has an 84% approval rating with an average rating of 6.8/10, based on 37 critic reviews. The website's critics consensus reads, "You wisely wraps things up just before Joe Goldberg's murderous machinations become stale, delivering a final season that ought to satisfy most viewers' morbid curiosity." Metacritic, which uses a weighted average, assigned the series a score of 53 out of 100, based on 12 critics, indicating "mixed or average" reviews.

=== Cultural influence ===
You gained a dedicated following soon after its release on Netflix. Once the first season became available to stream worldwide on Netflix, the series' popularity increased dramatically with an estimated 40 million people having viewed it, in its first month on the streaming platform, dwarfing its viewership from Lifetime. The series later became the subject of numerous online discussions and debates surrounding the romanticization of the serial killer and stalker protagonist in question. According to many reporters and critics, concerns were expressed regarding the viewers who have positively identified and connected with Penn Badgley's character on multiple social media platforms, despite the transgressive acts that the protagonist displayed and committed over the course of the season. Among the viewers who took an affinity to Joe was Stranger Things actress Millie Bobby Brown. Brown took to social media, sharing her initial thoughts in a video by downplaying Joe's questionable acts, but subsequently, changed her position on the matter after watching the entirety of the first season.

After Badgley received tweets from various fans and viewers of the series about how the series seemingly glorified Joe's violent behaviors, the actor responded with tongue-in-cheek replies on Twitter and Instagram and noted the importance of not romanticizing the actions of a psychopathic murderer. In response to the growing concerns of viewers romanticizing Joe's vicious behaviors, Elizabeth Lail conveyed her thoughts surrounding the conversation in an interview with Image. Lail expressed she initially had concerns about the audience's reactions but explained that "I think we are programmed that way. Myself included. With all the rom-coms and fairy tales we've read, we're programmed to root for the hero at any cost, unfortunately. And so, my hope is that these women notice that inside themselves; and ask themselves, 'oh gosh, why do I love this terrible man?' I hope they recognize it as an unconscious bias (that's inside most of us), and actively work against it."

Victoria Pedretti, the lead actress of the second season, responded in a commentary to the audience's strong alignment to Joe's perspective. In an interview with Variety, Pedretti stated that, though she is aware of the phenomenon behind the reactions and concerns after the series gained a remarkable following, it is fueling the conversation, citing that it "talks about the kind of horrors of being a young person on the internet today. [. . .] I think it's a really smart way to discuss this trope that we've romanticized so much — this idea of this man that Penn plays. We know these people, and they're really hard to pluck out because they see themselves, and we see them, as the nice guys."

=== Accolades ===
Year	Award	Category	Nominee(s)	Result	Ref.
2019	MTV Movie & TV Awards	Best Villain	Penn Badgley	Nominated	
2019	Saturn Awards	Best Streaming Horror & Thriller Series	You	Nominated	
2019	Saturn Awards	Best Actor in a Streaming Presentation	Penn Badgley	Nominated	
2019	Saturn Awards	Best Actress in a Streaming Presentation	Elizabeth Lail	Nominated	
2020	Artios Awards	Television Pilot & First Season – Drama	David H. Rapaport, Lyndsey Baldasare, Beth Bowling, and Kim Miscia	Nominated	
2022	Hollywood Critics Association TV Awards	Best Actor in a Streaming Series, Drama	Penn Badgley	Nominated	
2022	Hollywood Critics Association TV Awards	Best Actress in a Streaming Series, Drama	Victoria Pedretti	Nominated	
2022	MTV Movie & TV Awards	Best Villain	Victoria Pedretti	Nominated	
