= Marian Keyes =

Irish writer

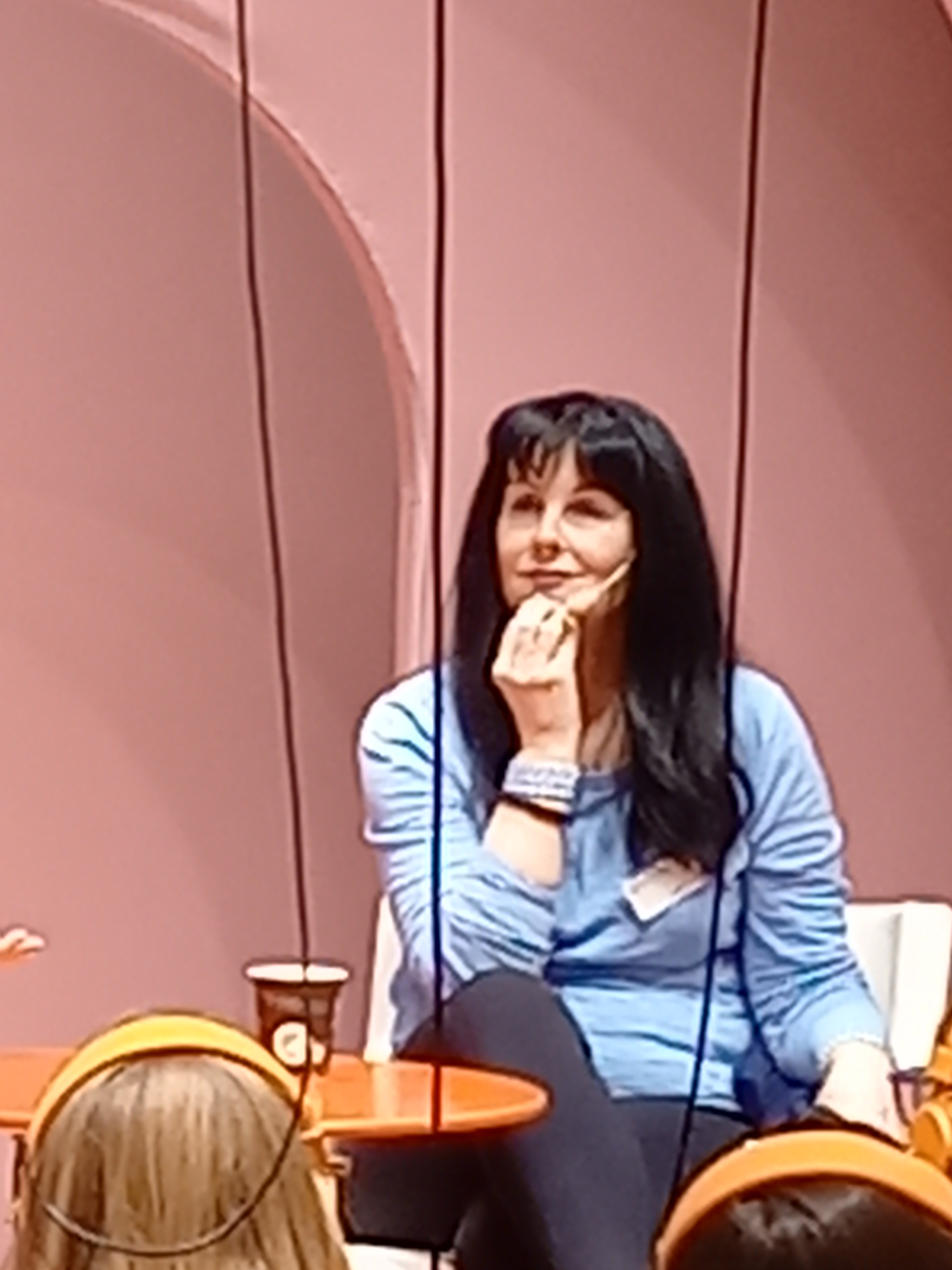
- Keyes at the 2022 Gothenburg Book Fair
- Born: 10 September 1963 (age 63); Limerick, Ireland
- Education: University College Dublin (BCL)
- Occupations: Writer, novelist
- Writing career
- Period: 1995–present
- Genre: Contemporary fiction
- Subjects: Family; Divorce; Mental illness Domestic violence Drug abuse Alcoholism
- Notable works: Fiction; Watermelon (1995); Lucy Sullivan Is Getting Married (1996); This Charming Man (2008)
- Website: www.mariankeyes.com

Marian Keyes (born 10 September 1963) is an Irish author and radio presenter who is best known for her popular fiction.

Keyes became known for her novels Watermelon, Lucy Sullivan Is Getting Married, Rachel's Holiday, Last Chance Saloon, Anybody Out There, and This Charming Man, that cover themes including alcoholism, depression, addiction, cancer, bereavement, and domestic violence through a humorous lens. More than 35 million copies of her novels have been sold, and her works have been translated into 33 languages.

== Early life and education ==
Marian Keyes was born in Ireland, one of five siblings, and raised in Cork. There was a history of alcoholism in her family, and her struggles with anxiety, depression, and alcoholism reportedly began at an early age.

Keyes graduated from University College Dublin with a law degree, and after completing her studies, she took an administrative job before moving to London in 1986. During this period, she became an alcoholic and was affected by clinical depression, culminating in a suicide attempt and subsequent rehabilitation in 1995 at the Rutland Centre in Dublin. She later said that she was distracted from her suicide attempt by an episode of Come Dine With Me; husband and assistant Tony defused the drama by saying, "let's see how you feel when we've finished watching it". She has noted this interaction as the beginning of her recovery from depression.

== Career ==
Keyes began writing short stories while suffering from alcoholism. After her treatment at the Rutland Centre, she returned to her job in London and submitted her short stories to Poolbeg Press. The publisher encouraged her to submit a full-length novel, and Keyes began work on her first book, Watermelon. The novel was published the same year. Since 1995, she has published many novels and works of non-fiction.

Keyes has written frankly about her clinical depression, which left her unable to sleep, read, write, or talk. After a long hiatus due to severe depression, a food title, Saved by Cake, was published in February 2012. Keyes's depressive period lasted about four years. During this time, she also wrote The Mystery of Mercy Close, a novel in which the heroine experiences similar battles with depression and suicide attempts as those Keyes herself experienced.

In 2019, the National Library of Ireland announced that the Keyes digital archive for her novel The Mystery of Mercy Close would be acquired by the library as a pilot project for collecting "born-digital" archives.

== Style ==
Although many of her novels are known as comedies, they revolve around dark themes, often drawn from Keyes's own experiences, including domestic violence, drug abuse, mental illness, divorce and alcoholism. Keyes considers herself a feminist, and has chosen to reflect feminist issues in many of her books.

Keyes's stories usually revolve around a strong female character who overcomes numerous obstacles to achieve lasting happiness. Regarding her decision to use an optimistic tone and hopeful ending, Keyes has said: "I'm very bleak, really melancholic. But I've always used humour as a survival mechanism. I write for me and I need to feel hopeful about the human condition. So no way I'm going to write a downbeat ending. And it isn't entirely ludicrous to suggest that sometimes things might work out for the best."

Critics recognise Keyes's writing as tackling difficult subjects in a relatable fashion. As told to The Irish Times by another Irish author: "It's a rare gift....The only other writer I can think of who writes so hilariously and movingly about serious subjects was the late, great Sue Townsend."

== Views ==
During her appearance on Desert Island Discs in March 2017, Keyes told the host that "[by] conditioning women to think that what they find empowering or valuable is worth less than what men consider to be worthwhile, women are prevented from reaching for parity and the gender gap in power and money between men and women is kept in the favour of men".

In an interview with The Irish Times in 2017, Keyes announced that she suspected "gender bias" to be at play when it comes to the recognition of women writers. She said that, despite her perceived success and acclaim, male writers with less commercial success were held in higher regard. "Do you remember in the early noughties when a lot of Irish women writers like Cathy Kelly, Sheila O'Flanagan, Cecelia Ahern were selling all over the world? I don't feel that was celebrated enough." She went on to "wonder" that "if a group of young Irish men around the same age had been selling in huge numbers", before concluding: "I really think it would not have passed unremarked." Similarly, Keyes has rejected the term "chick lit." During a Q&A in 2014 with Canada's Chatelaine magazine, when asked how she feels about the term, Keyes claimed that "it's meant to be belittling. It's as if it's saying, 'Oh you silly girls, with your pinkness and shoes, how will you ever run the world?' But as I've matured (haha) I've realised that I'm very proud of what I write about and I know that the books I write bring happiness and comfort to people". At an event at the Edinburgh Book Festival in August 2020, Keyes rejected the term chick lit as dismissive and sexist, as men writing similar fiction are not described as "dick lit".

== Awards ==
Keyes has received a number of awards. In 2009, her novel, This Charming Man, was awarded the Irish Popular Fiction Book by Irish Book Awards. She received two additional awards from Irish Book Awards: Ireland AM Popular Non-Fiction Book of the Year for the novel, Making It Up As I Go Along, in 2016, and Author of the Year in 2021.

== Personal life ==
In March 2017, Keyes was a guest castaway for BBC Radio 4's Desert Island Discs. Her favourite track was "You Have Been Loved" by George Michael. During her appearance, Keyes discussed her battle with constant suicidal urges at the height of her mental illness. She also told host Kirsty Young that despite all her efforts to treat her depression, including cognitive behavioral therapy, medication, mindfulness, hospitalisation and diets, what finally healed her was time: "It was an illness and it ran its course."

As of 2022, Keyes was living in Dún Laoghaire with her husband Tony Baines, whom she first met on his 30th birthday after returning to Ireland from Hampstead in 1997.

== Works ==
=== Walsh Family ===
- Watermelon (1995, Claire Walsh)
- Rachel's Holiday (1998, Rachel Walsh)
- Angels (2002, Maggie Walsh)
- Anybody Out There? (2006, Anna Walsh)
- Mammy Walsh's A–Z of the Walsh Family: An e-book Short (2012)
- The Mystery of Mercy Close (2012, Helen Walsh)
- Again, Rachel (2022, Rachel Walsh)
- My Favourite Mistake (2024, Anna Walsh)

=== Standalone Fiction ===
- Lucy Sullivan Is Getting Married (1996)
- Last Chance Saloon (1999)
- Sushi for Beginners (2000)
- No Dress Rehearsal (2000)
- The Other Side of the Story (2004)
- Nothing Bad ever Happens in Tiffany's (2005)
- This Charming Man (2008)
- The Brightest Star in the Sky (2009)
- The Woman Who Stole My Life (2014)
- The Break (2017)
- Grown Ups (2020)

=== Non-fiction ===
- Under the Duvet (2001) ISBN 9780241959374
- Further under the Duvet (2005) ISBN 978-0141021232
- Cracks in my Foundation in Damage Control – Women on the Therapists, Beauticians, and Trainers Who Navigate Their Bodies (2007) ISBN 9780060787035
- Saved by Cake (2012) ISBN 9780452299054
- Making It Up As I Go Along (2016) ISBN 9781510031449

=== Radio ===
- Between Ourselves With Marian Keyes BBC Radio 4 (2020–2021)
- Now You're Asking with Marian Keyes and Tara Flynn, BBC Radio 4 (2022–present)

== Film and television adaptations ==
Adaptations of Keyes's work include:

- Lucy Sullivan Is Getting Married (1999–2000)
- Watermelon (2003)
- Au secours j'ai trente ans (2004) – French adaptation of Last Chance Saloon
- The Walsh Sisters (2025) -TV adaptation of Rachel's Holiday and Anybody Out There?
- Grown Ups (2026)

== Sources ==
- Vallely, Paul (9 January 2010). "Marian Keyes: A darker side to chick-lit". The Independent. London.
- Flood, Alison (14 December 2012). "Marian Keyes: a life in books". The Guardian. London.
