= Jack the Ripper: Written in Blood =

2025 documentary series

Jack the Ripper: Written in Blood is a 2025 three part British documentary series focusing on the Jack the Ripper killings and the surrounding media circus that ensued around the Whitechapel murders. The series explores how a team of reporters from the Whitechapel Star helped fuel the legend of Jack the Ripper.

== Cast ==
- Moe Dunford as Thomas Power O’Connor, also known as T.P.
- Mark Strepan as Frederick Best
- Tyger Drew-Honey as Ernest Parke
- Andrew Tiernan as Sir Charles Warren, Commissioner of Police of the Metropolis
- Alan McKenna as Frederick Abberline, chief inspector
- Amy-Leigh Hickman as Henrietta Best
