= M. J. Arlidge =

English author

M.J. Arlidge
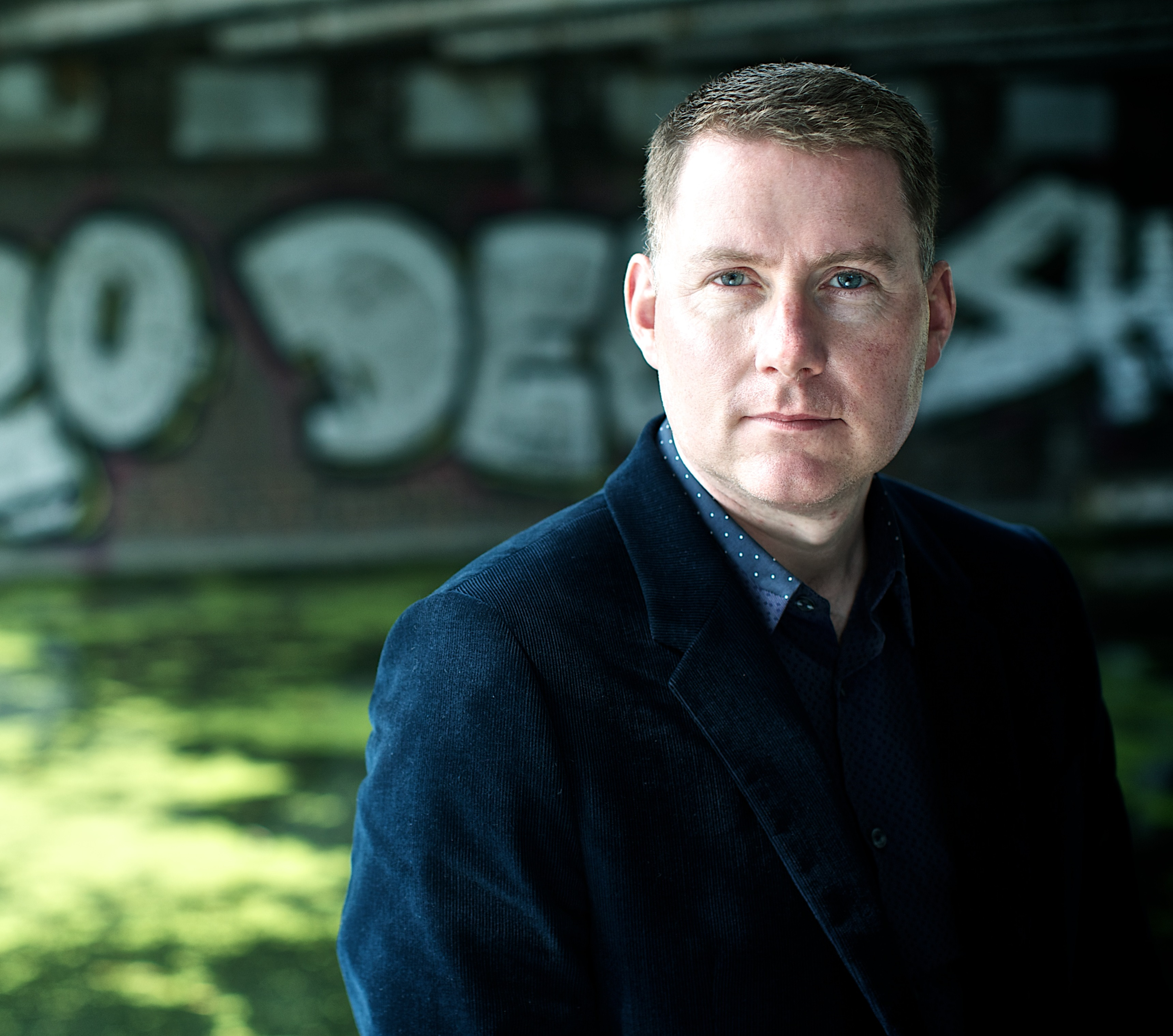
- Born: Matthew J. Arlidge; 1974 (age 51–52); London, England, UK
- Occupations: Author, television producer
- Notable work: Helen Grace novels

Matthew J. Arlidge (born 1974) is an English author of crime novels starring DI Helen Grace. He has also worked in television.

== Early life ==
Matthew Arlidge was born in London in 1974, the youngest of four siblings. He grew up in Hampstead, North London, attending University College School from 7 to 18 years of age. In between school and university, he travelled, teaching in a school in southern India, as well as visiting Singapore and Australia. On his return to the UK, he studied for an English Literature degree at St John's College, Cambridge. During this period he won the Douglas Chivers prize for outstanding Shakespeare scholarship. He subsequently spent a year studying Film and Television Production at Bristol University.

== Writing for television ==
Arlidge's early career was in television production, starting at EastEnders, the BBC1 soap opera. He began as a story liner, later graduating to become a script editor. After 18 months there, he left to work for Ecosse Films, a British film and television production company, spending two years story-lining and editing the BBC One series Monarch of the Glen, which starred Richard Briers and Susan Hampshire. He then became a television development producer with the same company, creating new shows for BBC, ITV and Channel 4 such as Mistresses, which has been remade for US television, and Cape Wrath, which starred Tom Hardy, Felicity Jones and David Morrissey. In 2007, Arlidge set up his own production company, TXTV Limited, with colleagues Jeremy Gwilt and Chris Lang. He executive-produced a number of British crime serials, including Torn, The Little House and Undeniable. Arlidge has also written for other crime series, including Silent Witness.

== Novels ==
Arlidge's first novel was published in May 2014. Eeny Meeny introduced British police officer Detective Inspector Helen Grace. Other Helen Grace novels followed, including Pop Goes the Weasel and The Doll's House. Several more Helen Grace novels are scheduled for release in the UK and other international markets, including the US, Germany, Italy, The Netherlands, Norway and France.

Arlidge’s series of novels is set in and around the English coastal city of Southampton. A tough, determined police officer who rides a motorbike and prefers to travel through life alone, she nevertheless is beset by personal demons. The legacy of a troubled childhood makes itself felt through her mood swings and tendency towards depression. She neither drinks nor takes drugs, so expiates her dark moods through the controlled use of pain, administered to her by her loyal dominator, Jake. She lives alone, takes occasional lovers and is deeply committed to her work. The criminals she pursues are sadistic, violent and determined, meaning Helen has to put her life on the line to bring them in. She is assisted by a number of colleagues at Southampton Central, most notably her loyal friend, DS Charlene "Charlie" Brooks.

=== Six Degrees of Assassination ===
- In 2015, Arlidge wrote a ten part audio thriller for Audible, with a cast including Andrew Scott, Hermione Norris and Freema Agyeman.

== Bibliography ==
=== Helen Grace novels ===
| Series Order | Title | Date | ISBN |
|---|---|---|---|
| 1 | Eeny Meeny | May 2014 | 9781405914871 |
| 2 | Pop Goes The Weasel | September 2014 | 9781405914956 |
| 3 | The Doll's House | February 2015 | 9781405919197 |
| 4 | Liar Liar | September 2015 | 9781405919210 |
| 5 | Little Boy Blue | March 2016 | 9780718181833 |
| 6 | Hide and Seek | December 2016 | 9781405925624 |
| 7 | Love Me Not | May 2017 | 9780718183851 |
| 8 | Down to the Woods | September 2018 | 9780718183875 |
| 9 | All Fall Down | June 2020 | 9789022589540 |
| 10 | Truth or Dare | June 2021 | 9781409188452 |
| 11 | Cat and Mouse | December 2022 | 9781409188520 |
| 12 | Forget Me Not | July 2024 | 9781398708235 |
| 13 | Into the Fire | July 2025 | 9781398708228 |
| 14 | Out of the Ashes | July 2026 | |

=== Helen Grace short stories ===
| Series Order | Title | Date |
|---|---|---|
| 5.5 | No Way Back | August 2016 |
| 6.5 | Running Blind | April 2018 |

=== Standalone novels ===
| Title | Date | ISBN |
|---|---|---|
| A Gift for Dying | March 2019 | 9781405932509 |
| Eye for an Eye | July 2023 | 9781398708181 |
