= Karin Hanczewski =

German actress (born 1981)

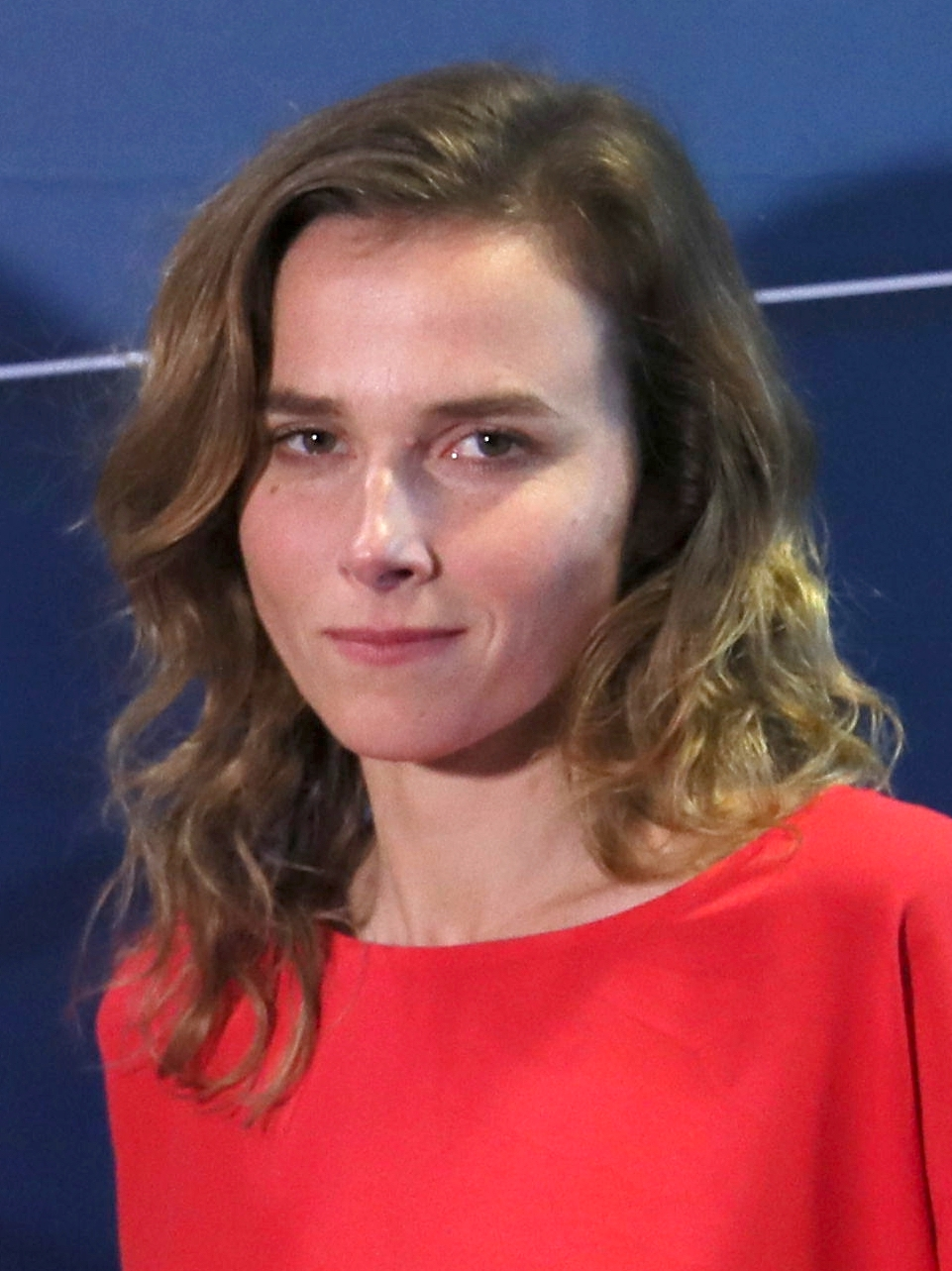
- Hanczewski in 2018
- Born: 22 December 1981 (age 44); West Berlin, West Germany
- Occupation: Actress

Karin Hanczewski (German: [ˈkaʁin hanˈtʃɛfski];born 22 December 1981) is a German actress.

== Early life ==
Hanczewski comes from a Polish family. After four years of training at the European Theater Institute in Berlin, which began in 2002, she was given a permanent position at the Junge Theater in Göttingen from 2005 to 2008. She received her first film and television roles in the debut-film Marla by Marta Malowanczyk, in which she played the leading role and which was nominated for the First Steps film-award, as well as in Tatort: …es wird Trauer sein und Schmerz. Since then, she has appeared in short-, feature-, and television-films. Furthermore, she starred in a play every year from 2009 to 2012.

From 2016 to 2025, she portrayed Detective Karin Gorniak as part of the investigative team of Winkler, Gorniak, and Schnabel in the MDR contribution to the long-running television series Tatort ("Dresden Detectives" episodes).

== Personal life ==
On 5 February 2021, as part of the #ActOut initiative in SZ-Magazin, Hanczewski came out as lesbian alongside 184 other lesbian, gay, bisexual, queer, non-binary, and transgender actors. The initiative was initiated jointly by Godehard Giese, Eva Meckbach, and Hanczewski herself in order to create further acceptance in their industry and in society. In an interview, she has stated that she had been warned about coming out with regard to future offers after she had been cast for the television series Tatort.
