= This Charming Man (novel) =

2008 novel by Marian Keyes

- 2008 cover
- Author: Marian Keyes
- Language: English
- Publisher: Michael Joseph
- Publication date: 27 March 2008
- Publication place: Ireland
- Pages: 688 pp
- ISBN: 0-7181-4912-2

This Charming Man is a 2008 novel by Irish author Marian Keyes. It centres on the engagement of popular politician Paddy de Courcy and the impact this has on the women in his life. The novel won the Popular Fiction Award at the Irish Book Awards 2009, having received the most votes from the Irish public.

== Plot summary ==
The main characters are: Paddy de Courcy, a charismatic politician; Lola Daly, a stylist; Grace Gildee, a journalist; Marnie Hunter, Grace's alcoholic sister; and Alicia Thornton, Paddy's fiancée. The story is told predominantly from the viewpoints of the first three, although there are occasional sections from Alicia's point of view. Lola, Paddy's girlfriend, is heartbroken when she hears of his engagement and moves to County Clare to get away from him. Marnie, who was Paddy's high school girlfriend and still has feelings for him, is an alcoholic and eventually loses her job, husband and children; her sister Grace attempts to help Marnie, get an interview with Lola, and hide her relationship with Paddy from her partner Damien. Over the course of the book it is revealed that all three women - plus various other ex-girlfriends of Paddy's - have been abused by him.

== Reception ==
This Charming Man has been described as Marian Keyes's darkest and most uncompromising novel. Her storytelling ability and the candour of her approach have been commended, while the novel is considered to be a testament to the strength women find in themselves in response to tough times.
