= Schitt's Creek season 1 =

2015 season of Schitt's Creek

Schitt's Creek
- Season 1
- Promotional poster
- Starring: Eugene Levy; Catherine O'Hara; Daniel Levy; Annie Murphy; Jennifer Robertson; Tim Rozon; Emily Hampshire; Dustin Milligan; Sarah Levy; John Hemphill; Karen Robinson; Chris Elliott
- No. of episodes: 13

Release
- Original network: CBC Television
- Original release: January 13 – March 31, 2015

Season chronology
- Next → Season 2

The first season of Schitt's Creek a Canadian television sitcom created by Daniel Levy and father Eugene Levy premiered on January 13, 2015, and concluded on March 31, 2015, on CBC Television. The season aired 13 episodes and saw the introduction of the characters Johnny Rose, Moira Rose, David Rose, and Alexis Rose. The season was produced by Not a Real Company Productions.

The season featured a large cast of actors credited in starring roles, including series creators Eugene & Daniel Levy. Close friends and even family to the Levys starred as well, including Catherine O'Hara, Annie Murphy, Sarah Levy, and Chris Elliott.

On January 12, 2015, CBC Television renewed the series for a second season.

== Episodes ==
No. overall	No. in season	Title	Directed by	Written by	Original release date	Prod. code	Canadian viewers (millions)
1	1	"Our Cup Runneth Over"	Jerry Ciccoritti	Daniel Levy	January 13, 2015	262452-1	1.359
After their business manager steals all of their money, the Rose family are forced to move to the town of Schitt's Creek, which Johnny bought in 1991 as a joke gift for David. They take up residence in the town's motel, and immediately insult the town's pushy, oblivious mayor, Roland Schitt, and the motel's sole employee, Stevie Budd. Alexis intends to escape Schitt's Creek by taking up with her wealthy boyfriend Stavros, but he breaks up with her.
2	2	"The Drip"	Jerry Ciccoritti	Chris Pozzebon	January 13, 2015	262452-2	1.366
Johnny tries to get permission from Roland to sell Schitt's Creek; Stevie invites David and Alexis to a truck party. Johnny, Moira, and David have dinner at Roland and Jocelyn Schitt's home. Alexis, trying to get over Stavros, goes to the party to find some attractive men to pose with for social media. After taking selfies with random men, she spies an attractive stranger, Mutt, at the barbecue; she kisses him, snaps some pics, and leaves. David escapes the dinner and also goes to the party, where Stevie encourages him to join in a traditional party drinking game. At the Schitt home, Roland relents and signs the contract after Moira slaps him in the style of her former soap opera persona.
3	3	"Don't Worry, It's His Sister"	Paul Fox	Michael Short	January 20, 2015	262452-3	1.266
In an attempt to make Schitt's Creek attractive to buyers, Johnny tries to have the town welcome sign, which depicts Roland's great-grandfather in a suggestive pose with his own sister, removed. Moira finds some mean comments about her online from anonymous posters and suffers an emotional meltdown; Johnny places Alexis in charge of taking care of Moira until the crisis passes. Moira accepts Jocelyn's invitation to discuss acting with the students at the local high school where Jocelyn teaches, only to break down into a series of melodramatic, self-pitying monologues. David tries to get a job at the local supermarket, but Johnny's well-intentioned phone calls sabotage him.
4	4	"Bad Parents"	Jerry Ciccoritti	Kevin White	January 27, 2015	262452-4	0.834
Johnny and Moira become worried that they have been bad parents and try to improve their relationships with David and Alexis. Alexis is paired with Mutt, whom she kissed at the party, to perform community service as a result of her drunk driving conviction. Mutt disappears during their first day; Alexis sees Mutt with Jocelyn and believes the two are having an affair. Alexis tells her parents, who believe her, until Jocelyn and Roland reveal that Mutt is their estranged son, who does not get along with Roland. David needs more space for his clothes, and Stevie tries to help him sell items from his wardrobe; when this proves unsuccessful, she offers him a different room in the motel to store his clothes.
5	5	"The Cabin"	Paul Fox	Amanda Walsh	February 3, 2015	262452-5	0.724
After David walks in on Johnny and Moira having sex, Roland offers Johnny and Moira the use of his cabin to get away from their children. With their parents away, Alexis talks David into having a game night but invites a large number of people—including Mutt and his girlfriend, Twyla—and turns the evening into a drunken party, upsetting David. Johnny and Moira have trouble getting into the cabin but eventually make it inside and have sex, only to find Bob and Gwen, the owners of the cabin, who reveal that Roland's cabin is further up the road. David and Stevie bond further over their shared dislike of the town's population.
6	6	"Wine and Roses"	Jerry Ciccoritti	Kevin White	February 10, 2015	262452-6	0.759
Johnny contacts a local winery to try and get a job, but the company hires Moira as its commercial spokesperson. Johnny feels left out while Moira receives all the attention, but soon realizes his importance when Moira struggles and needs encouragement. David suffers a panic attack, and Stevie takes him to see Ted, the town veterinarian, as there are no other doctors in the area. David and Alexis attend a partner yoga class and are partnered with Jocelyn and Mutt, respectively, forcing Alexis into an uncomfortable situation.
7	7	"Turkey Shoot"	Paul Fox	Story by : Michael Grassi; Teleplay by : Daniel Levy	February 17, 2015	262452-7	0.688
David is unable to kill an insect in his room, which inspires Stevie to invite him turkey hunting with herself, Ronnie, and Roland. David shoots a turkey but does not kill it, and has a terrible time. Meanwhile, Jocelyn invites Moira to a day out at a beauty salon at Johnny's behest, where they style Moira's hair exactly like Jocelyn's. Ted takes Alexis out on a date.
8	8	"Allez-Vous"	Paul Fox	Chris Pozzebon	February 24, 2015	262452-8	N/A
Moira receives a package from an old friend, which turns out to be a starter kit for a pyramid scheme cosmetics company. She and David host a party to sell the products, only to realize all of the attendees are already involved in the company, as it had become popular in the town several years prior. Johnny decides to apply for unemployment but needs to travel to a neighboring town. In order to get to the unemployment office, he test drives a car Bob is selling, only to have the car break down. David calls Roland, who helps secure Johnny's claim through his past relationship with the unemployment office employee.
9	9	"Carl's Funeral"	Jerry Ciccoritti	Kevin White	March 3, 2015	262452-9	0.837
Bob's brother dies and he asks Johnny to deliver a eulogy, despite Johnny having never met his brother. Several relatives of the deceased arrive at the motel, much to David's chagrin; to avoid the unpleasant guests, Alexis stays at Ted's house, but becomes uncomfortable with how much he prioritizes his foster dogs. Johnny gives the eulogy but begins insulting the town until Moira begins singing "Danny Boy" to drown out his negative speech. Stevie and David smoke a joint and end up having sex.
10	10	"Honeymoon"	Jerry Ciccoritti	Daniel Levy	March 10, 2015	262452-10	N/A
Johnny and Moira beg to be invited to a party hosted by Jocelyn and Roland, where the four share a joint together. Ted hosts dinner, and Alexis invites David, Stevie, Mutt, and Twyla under the pretence that it is a big party. A heated discussion ensues, with Ted suspicious of what Alexis and Mutt's relationship, and Twyla becomes annoyed that Mutt is confiding in Alexis but not her. Stevie feigns annoyance in order to escape the bad atmosphere of the couples squabbling, taking David with her. They decide to try spending another night together but are interrupted en route by the arrival of Johnny and Moira, who are still high.
11	11	"Little Sister"	Paul Fox	Michael Short	March 17, 2015	262452-11	0.622
Moira's estranged younger sister, Dee Dee, surprises the family with a visit. Johnny had previously lent her $50,000, and Moira is upset that Dee Dee never repaid the loan. When Dee Dee attempts to repay her loan, Moira refuses to accept it. Johnny is mad at Moira as he feels she is too proud to accept help from her sister. Moira accepts and asks Dee Dee to repay some of her loan, but the amount she pays insults Johnny. Jocelyn asks David to discuss his difficulties understanding his sexuality with a high school student, but the student rejects David's advice. David meets with Stevie, and the two decide not to continue having sex due to potential complications in their friendship.
12	12	"Surprise Party"	Paul Fox	Chris Pozzebon	March 24, 2015	262452-12	N/A
Johnny wants to throw Moira a surprise birthday party and enlists the help of his children. Alexis resists because Ted will be out of town, but David guilts her into attending. David and Johnny request Roland's help to make it seem like Jocelyn is hosting a charity fundraiser as a distraction, but Moira becomes obsessed with the fictitious charity and attempts to control it. Alexis asks Mutt to use his barn for the event. David convinces Moira to participate by revealing her surprise birthday party. The party is a success, and Alexis flirts with Mutt until Ted surprises her with his return to town.
13	13	"Town for Sale"	Jerry Ciccoritti	Teleplay by : Kevin White; Story by : Daniel Levy	March 31, 2015	262452-13	0.872
Johnny meets Andy Roberts, a potential buyer for the town, and prepares for his family to leave. Alexis plans to move to Los Angeles and is surprised when Ted asks her to marry him, which she rejects, with the caveat that she would accept if her family was staying; she then visits Mutt's barn and has sex with him. David prepares to move to New York City and asks Stevie to move with him, but she declines, as she still has feelings for him. Roland invites Andy to supper at his home before he can sign the contract, where Andy falls into a coma and is unable to complete the purchase. The Roses are forced to stay, and Alexis must reckon with having cheated on Ted; David, unaware that the sale has fallen through, flees town in Roland's truck.

== Cast and characters ==
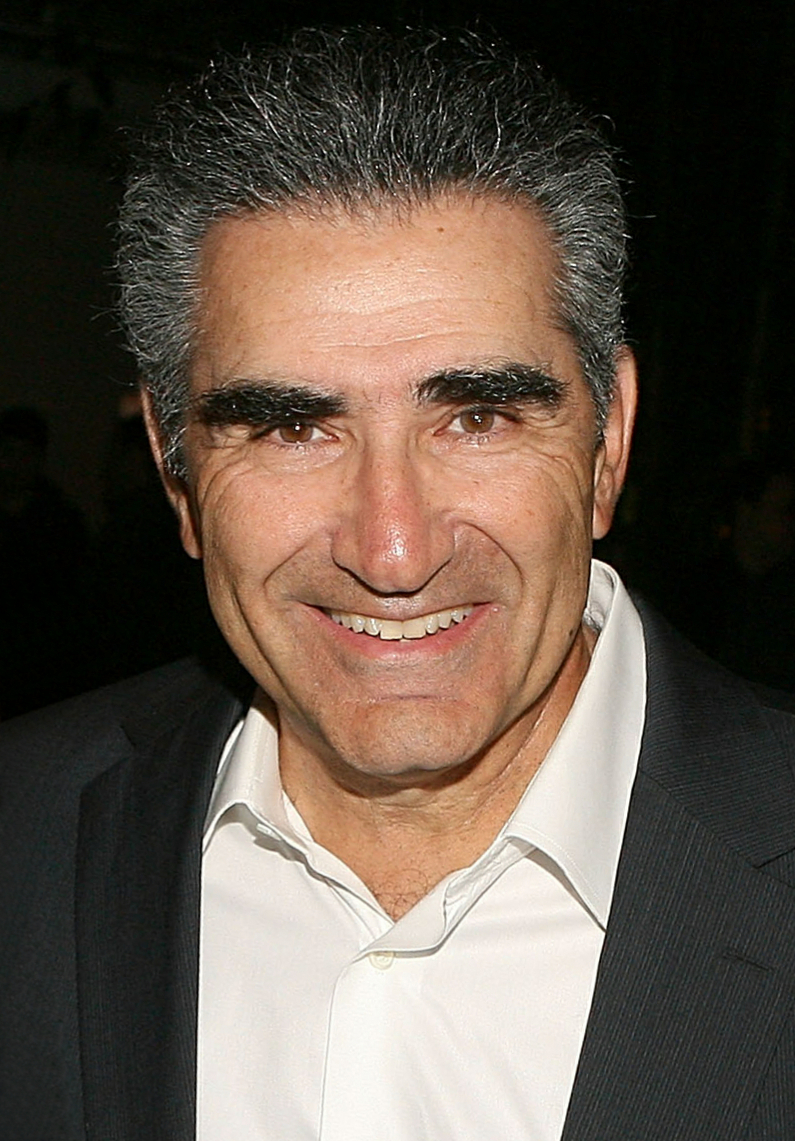
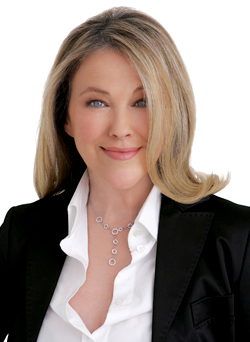
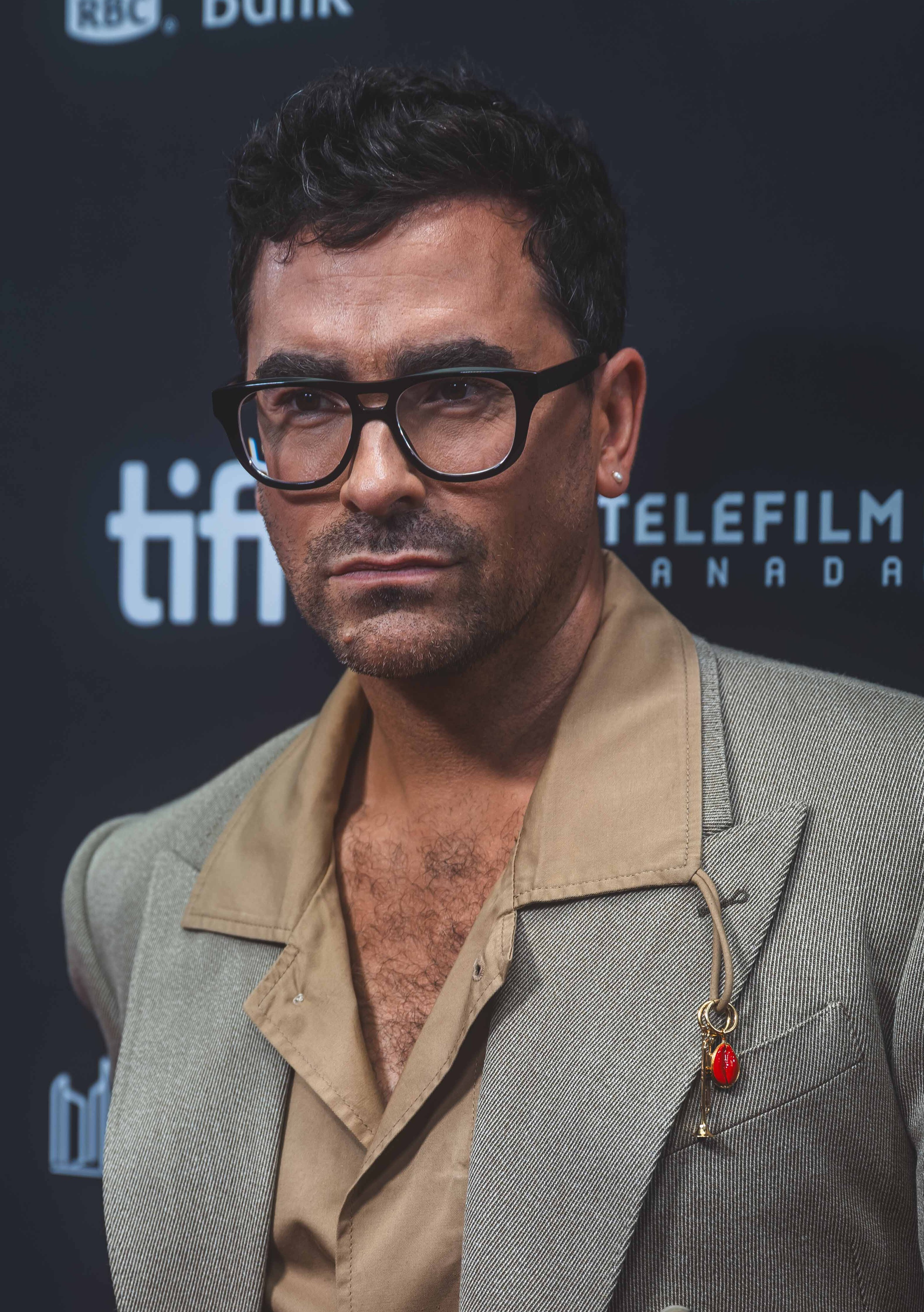
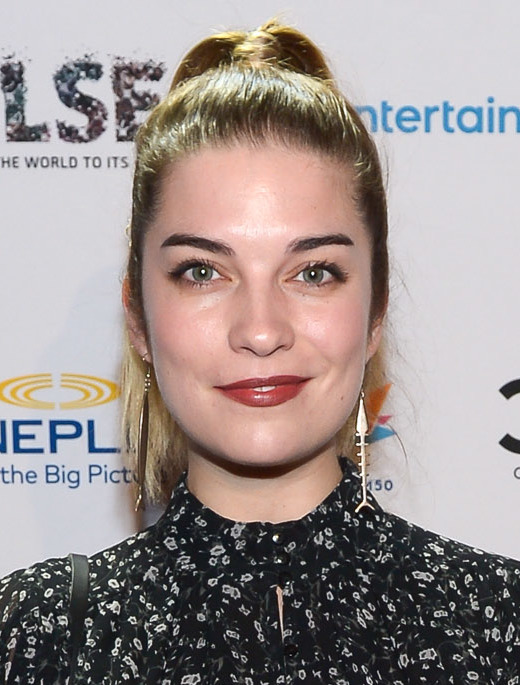
(Clockwise from top left) The series stars Eugene Levy, Catherine O'Hara, Annie Murphy, and Daniel Levy as the Rose family

=== Main ===
- Eugene Levy as Johnny Rose
- Catherine O'Hara as Moira Rose
- Daniel Levy as David Rose
- Annie Murphy as Alexis Rose
- Jennifer Robertson as Jocelyn Schitt
- Emily Hampshire as Stevie Budd
- Tim Rozon as Mutt Schitt
- Chris Elliott as Roland Schitt

=== Starring ===
- Dustin Milligan as Ted Mullens (Note: Credited only in the episode the actor appears in.)
- Sarah Levy as Twyla Sands
- John Hemphill as Bob Currie
- Karen Robinson as Ronnie Lee

=== Recurring ===
- Marilyn Bellfontaine as Gwen Currie
- Rizwan Manji as Ray Butani

=== Special Guest Stars ===
- Elizabeth McEachern as Robin
- Richard Waugh as Herb Ertlinger
- Jennifer Irwin as Dee Dee

== Reception and release ==
=== Critical response ===
The first season of Schitt's Creek generally received positive reviews. It holds an approval rating of 68% on Rotten Tomatoes based on 28 ratings averaging 6.4/10. The website's critical consensus reads, "The title is one of the best jokes of Schitt's Creek, but performances from Eugene Levy and Catherine O'Hara give the writing a comedic boost." On Metacritic, the first season has a score of 64 out of 100, based on 11 critics, indicating "generally favorable reviews". Vinay Menon of the Toronto Star wrote that the show "is one of the best CBC comedies in years". After being picked up by Pop, the Los Angeles Times described the show as "very funny, beautifully played, [and] sometimes touching," although Mike Hale of The New York Times called Schitt's Creek "drab and underwritten".

=== Awards and nominations ===
Schitt's Creek's first season received two Directors Guild of Canada awards from three nominations, the directing team of "Our Cup Runneth Over" & Brendan Smith each won the award respectively, while the directing team for "Surprise Party" were also nominated but did not win the award. At the 2016 ceremony, the first season also received nine Canadian Screen Awards from 16 nominations. The winners included Eugene Levy, Dan Levy, Andrew Barnsley, Fred Levy, Ben Feigin, Mike Short, Kevin White, Colin Brunton, Catherine O'Hara & Chris Elliott.

=== Release ===
The show initially premiered on the CBC in Canada on January 13, 2015, with back-to-back episodes. It made its debut in the United States on Pop TV on February 11, 2015.
