= Schitt's Creek season 3 =

2017 season of Schitt's Creek

Schitt's Creek
- Season 3
- Promotional poster
- Starring: Eugene Levy; Catherine O'Hara; Daniel Levy; Annie Murphy; Jennifer Robertson; Emily Hampshire; Dustin Milligan; Sarah Levy; John Hemphill; Karen Robinson; Rizwan Manji; Steve Lund; Noah Reid; Chris Elliott
- No. of episodes: 13

Release
- Original network: CBC Television
- Original release: January 10 – April 4, 2017

Season chronology
- ← Previous; Season 2

The third season of Schitt's Creek, a Canadian television sitcom created by Daniel Levy and father Eugene Levy, premiered on January 10, 2017, and concluded on April 4, 2017, on CBC Television. The season aired 13 episodes and saw the return of the characters Johnny, Moira, David, and Alexis Rose. It was once again produced by Not a Real Company Productions.

The season saw the return of large majority of the main cast. However, cast member Tim Rozon only appeared as his character Mutt Schitt during one episode, making him a special guest star. In addition, Steve Lund who portrayed Jake during the second-season finale, was added amongst the regular cast. Noah Reid was added to the cast as Patrick Brewer, and Robin Duke did not return as Wendy Kurtz.

The series was renewed for a fourth season on March 10, 2017.

== Cast and characters ==
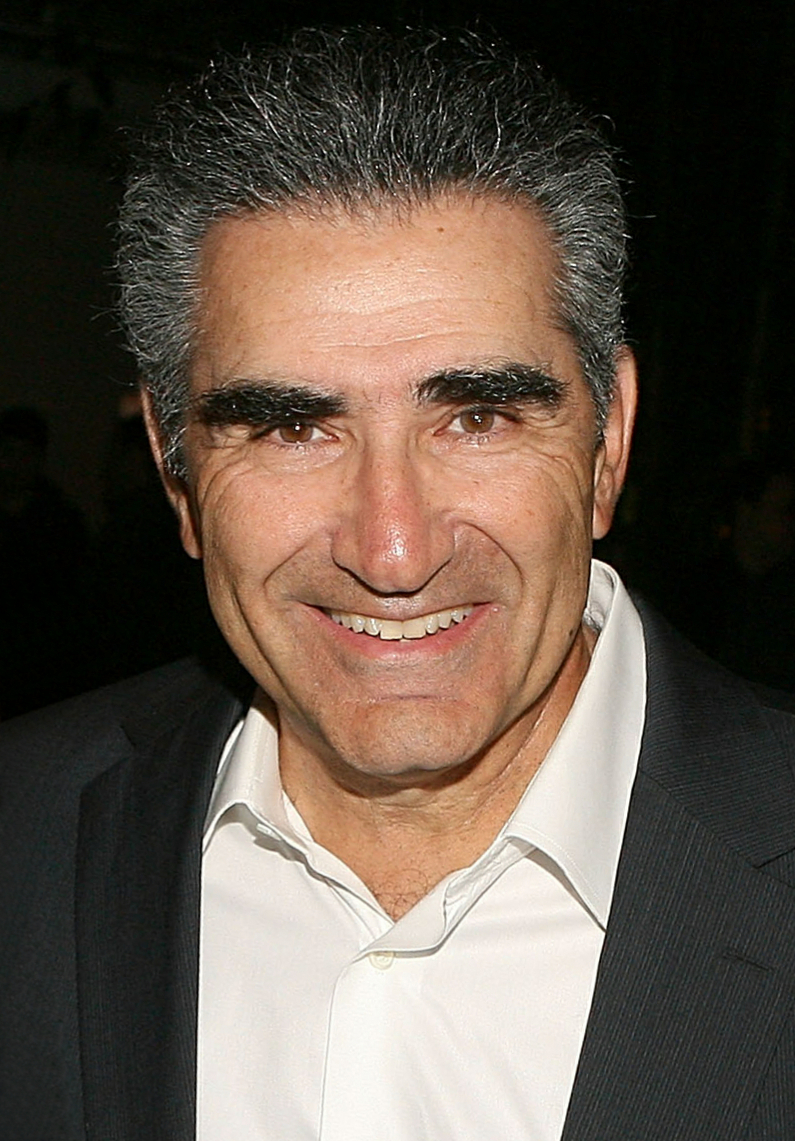
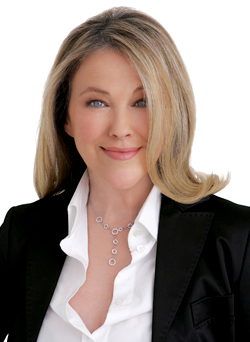
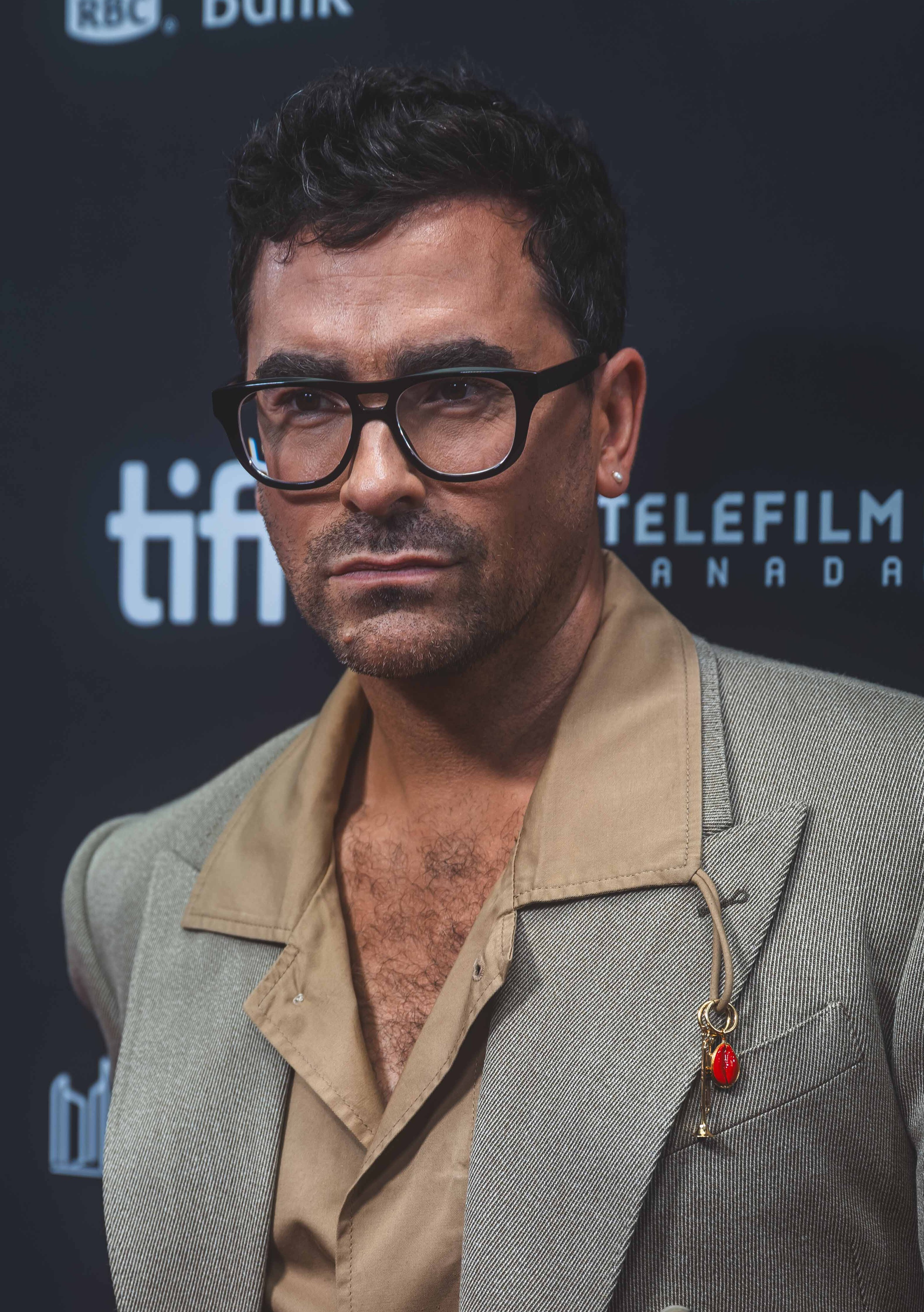
Eugene Levy (Johnny Rose), Catherine O'Hara (Moira Rose), and Dan Levy (David Rose)
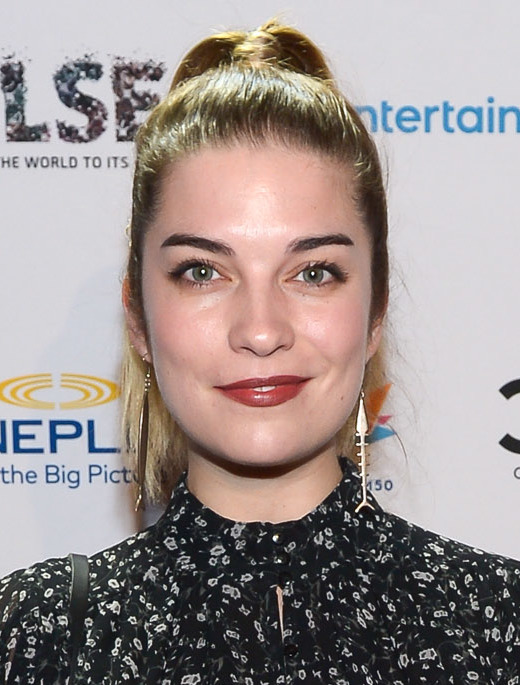
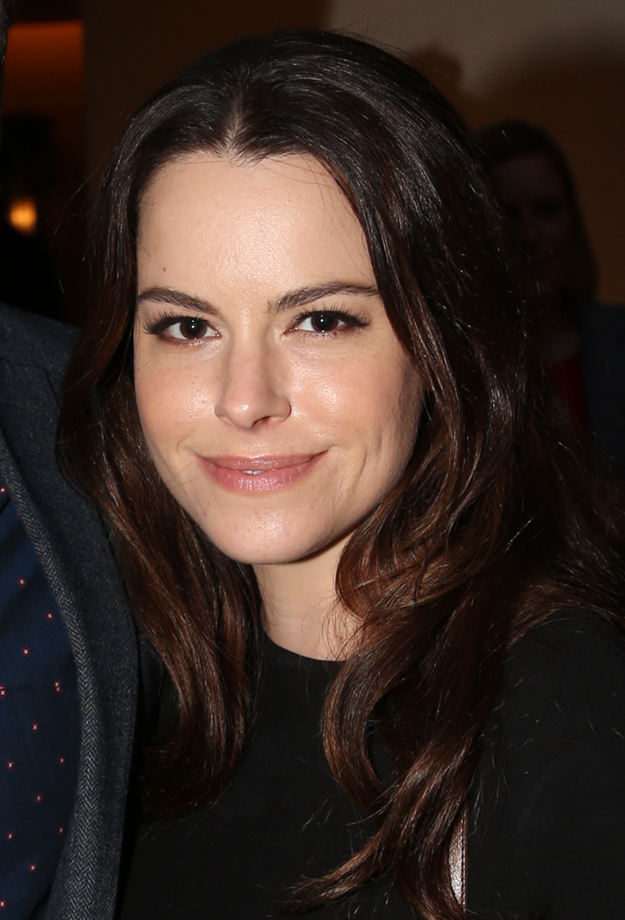
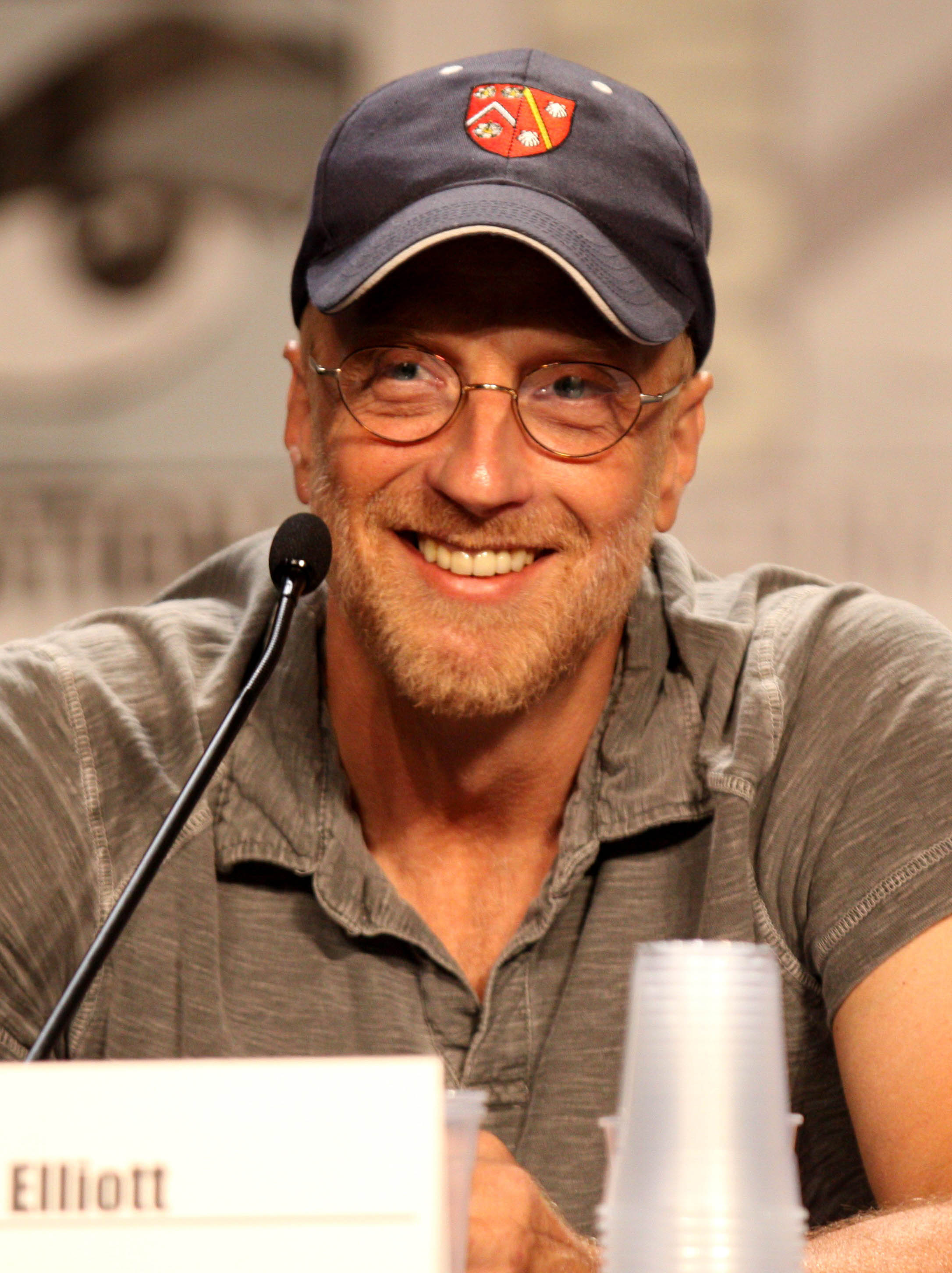
Annie Murphy (Alexis Rose), Emily Hampshire (Stevie Budd), and Chris Elliott (Roland Schitt)

=== Main ===
- Eugene Levy as Johnny Rose
- Catherine O'Hara as Moira Rose
- Dan Levy as David Rose
- Annie Murphy as Alexis Rose
- Jennifer Robertson as Jocelyn Schitt
- Emily Hampshire as Stevie Budd
- Dustin Milligan as Ted Mullens
- Chris Elliott as Roland Schitt

=== Starring ===
- Noah Reid as Patrick Brewer
- Sarah Levy as Twyla Sands
- John Hemphill as Bob Currie
- Karen Robinson as Ronnie Lee
- Steve Lund as Jake
- Rizwan Manji as Ray Butani

=== Recurring ===
- Marilyn Bellfontaine as Gwen Currie

=== Special Guest Stars ===
- Lili Conner as Grace
- François Arnaud as Sebastien Raine
- Tim Rozon as Mutt Schitt
- Sarah Power as Tennessee
- Shakura S'Aida as Lena
- Elizabeth McEachern as Robin
- Jasmin Geljo as Ivan

== Episodes ==
No. overall	No. in season	Title	Directed by	Written by	Original release date	Prod. code	Canadian viewers (millions)
27	1	"Opening Night"	T. W. Peacocke	Daniel Levy	January 10, 2017	262452-27	0.992
Johnny struggles to get a new business venture off the ground while dealing with unwelcome competition at Bob’s Garage. Moira is an active participant at her first Town Council meeting, but overpromises on town child-care without considering budget issues. David begins dating Jake but is surprised to find that Stevie is also dating him. Mutt prepares to take a trip with his new girlfriend, Tennessee, and offers to let Alexis stay at his barn, which visibly annoys Tennessee.
28	2	"The Throuple"	T. W. Peacocke	David West Read	January 17, 2017	262452-28	N/A
Johnny offers to help Twyla at the restaurant when her leg is injured, but struggles with waiting on tables. Alexis and Moira make lunch plans but are both uncomfortable about having time alone together. Alexis reveals that she always felt that her mother's fame made spending time with her difficult. Jake calls a meeting with Stevie and David, and while both of them think he is ending the relationship with the other one, he offers to have a three-person relationship with them, which they decline. Stevie and David agree to end their relationships with Jake.
29	3	"New Car"	Paul Fox	Kevin White	January 24, 2017	262452-29	N/A
Johnny decides to buy a car. After David points out how wealthy they both look, Johnny and Moira visit the Schitts to borrow some "working class" clothes. Moira crafts an elaborate and bizarre backstory in a Cockney accent but they receive a discount because the car dealers are fans of her former TV soap opera. Stevie's Great-aunt Maureen dies, David is supportive and also assures Stevie that her concerns about becoming like her Great-aunt are unfounded. After Stevie and David scatter the ashes, a lawyer visits and Stevie is shocked to find that Maureen has left her ownership of the motel.
30	4	"Driving Test"	Paul Fox	Michael Short	January 31, 2017	262452-30	N/A
Stevie is overwhelmed by her newfound ownership of the motel and suggests selling it, which Johnny and Moira are keen to discourage. When Ray arrives to talk about the motel sale, Johnny steps in to say he will help Stevie as business partner, so the motel is not for sale. David's drivers license expires, so Alexis drives him to his driving test. David becomes stressed out and reveals to Alexis that he was always worried about her while they were both growing up, and he has always been concerned for Alexis, which pleases her.
31	5	"Rooms by the Hour"	T. W. Peacocke	Monica Heisey and Daniel Levy	February 7, 2017	262452-31	N/A
Johnny is now working in the motel and rents rooms to a local businesswoman, only to find that she is running a temporary prostitution ring out of the motel. Moira receives an invitation to audition for a horror film and requests David's help, but he is suspicious about the movie. She is excited to receive the part, but declines after learning the trip is in another country and she will be paid minimally in another currency. Alexis tries to help Ted give several rabbits up for adoption by setting up a webcam, which inadvertently attracts extra viewers as Ted can also be seen in the background, undressing after his work-out run.
32	6	"Murder Mystery"	T. W. Peacocke	Michael Short	February 14, 2017	262452-32	N/A
Johnny and Stevie visit a golf course for a business meeting. Johnny, a keen golfer, is dismayed he won't be getting to play, but Stevie asks the owners and gains Johnny some time on the green. Twyla organizes her annual murder mystery party which is not popular with the rest of the town. Moira is initially reluctant to accept her invitation but when she learns no one is attending Twyla's party, Moira steps up to make it a success. Ted encourages Alexis to return to college but finds she cannot go because she never graduated high school.
33	7	"General Store"	Paul Fox	Daniel Levy	February 21, 2017	262452-33	N/A
Encouraged by Stevie, David decides to take over the town's general store which is closing. Moira discourages him out of fear that his business will lose money, and reveals that she financially assisted his previous art galleries which upsets David and makes him doubt his ability as a business owner. Stevie reassures him. Alexis enthusiastically returns to finish high school and finds herself in Jocelyn's class. With some initial awkwardness on re-entering the classroom as the only older student amongst much younger pupils, Alexis soon endears herself to classmates.
34	8	"Motel Review"	Paul Fox	Kevin White	February 28, 2017	262452-34	N/A
David applies for a business license and meets Patrick, who helps him apply and jokingly makes fun of him. David later calls Patrick, trying to explain his business plan, but makes a mess of it, with several calls left on Patrick's voice-mail. Jocelyn accuses Alexis of plagiarism with one of her school papers, Johnny later admits to Alexis that he tried to help and rewrote her paper. She re-writes her paper alone and passes her class. Moira reluctantly covers the motel reception and is abrupt with an awkward guest, who then leaves a negative review. Johnny is distraught and persuades Moira to apologise, but she uses her acting skills to get the review removed without having to say sorry.
35	9	"The Affair"	T. W. Peacocke	David West Read	March 7, 2017	262452-35	N/A
Moira and Roland attend an overnight council event where Moira is quite popular and joins an after-drinks celebration. The next morning she learns she passed out on top of Roland's bed after mistaking his hotel room for hers. Moira is horrified and embarrassed while Jocelyn is upset about the implication of her waking up in her naked husband's bed. Meanwhile, Alexis helps her brother set up his new store, though she works more at sampling everything than moving inventory and setting up. Patrick becomes involved in David's new business and plans to write grants to secure additional funding.
36	10	"Sebastien Raine"	T. W. Peacocke	Kevin White	March 14, 2017	262452-36	N/A
David’s pretentious photographer ex-boyfriend, Sebastien Raine, arrives in town from New York to do a photo series on Moira. He takes photos of Moira that would be embarrassing, which she does not realize at first was his intention. David sleeps with him and steals the memory card with the photos and destroys it. Alexis and Ted volunteer at a retirement home where Alexis finds out, from one of the retiree women, that Ted still has feelings for Alexis. Johnny and Roland suspect that Bob is cheating at poker with the help of his wife but Bob explains they all have tells that make it easy to win every hand.
37	11	"Stop Saying Lice!"	Paul Fox	Daniel Levy	March 21, 2017	262452-37	N/A
Alexis contracts head lice from the high school, which spreads into the motel, and causes panic amongst the Roses. David spends the night at Stevie's to stay away from the lice, and she tells him that Patrick likes him. Ted kindly helps Alexis to comb out her lice at the veterinary clinic after she shows up on the weekend asking for tips on removing lice for "a friend". The town council offers to build and name a rose garden after Moira but she declines. When she finds out her husband paid to have them offer, she gets upset but ultimately, after speaking with Jocelyn, she accepts the gesture.
38	12	"Friends & Family"	Paul Fox	David West Read	March 28, 2017	262452-38	N/A
The Rose family has their old, oversized portrait (from their previously opulent life), delivered to their motel and find it's too big to fit anywhere. Against Patrick's suggestion, David launches a 'soft opening' for their new store but word of a discount gets around and there are long queues outside, which worries David but the event is ultimately a big success. Alexis and Ted kiss when she learns she passed her graduation exams, but Ted backs away when she tries to kiss him again and they both agree it would be better to avoid it and remain platonic. In the end the family throw away the formal painting of themselves because it no longer represents who they are.
39	13	"Grad Night"	T. W. Peacocke	Kevin White and Daniel Levy	April 4, 2017	262452-39	N/A
It's Alexis' graduation day and David's birthday, the latter of which their parents forgot. Alexis tells her family she does not want them attending her graduation so they quickly make their own plans; Moira and the Jazzagals have a singing event, Johnny celebrates fully booking the motel for the first time, and David is invited to a birthday dinner by Patrick. When Stevie shows up, at David's request, she realizes Patrick had intended the dinner as a date so she tells David and makes an excuse to leave them alone to an enjoyable evening. Ted shows up at Alexis' graduation ceremony, which surprises her because she quit his vet office earlier after seeing the applications of more qualified people and she wanted to find a job more suited to her talents. After her mother and the Jazzagals make a surprise appearance at the graduation, and David and Patrick share a goodnight kiss, the Rose family gather in the evening to celebrate both Alexis' graduation and David's birthday.

== Production ==
=== Casting ===
The season featured 9 starring roles, including 8 returning cast members from the second season. Tim Rozon who appeared as main cast member during the first two seasons, only returned as a special guest star.

Noah Reid joined the recurring cast as David's business partner and love interest, Patrick Brewer.

== Release ==
The season premiered on January 10, 2017, on an 8:00 pm ET/PT time slot with an encore broadcast at 11:00 pm ET/PT on Pop. The third season was released to home media in Canada on April 11, 2017.
