= Schitt's Creek season 2 =

2016 season of Schitt's Creek

Schitt's Creek
- Season 2
- Promotional poster
- Starring: Eugene Levy; Catherine O'Hara; Daniel Levy; Annie Murphy; Jennifer Robertson; Tim Rozon; Emily Hampshire; Dustin Milligan; Sarah Levy; John Hemphill; Karen Robinson; Robin Duke; Chris Elliott
- No. of episodes: 13

Release
- Original network: CBC Television
- Original release: January 12 – March 29, 2016

Season chronology
- ← Previous; Season 1 Next → Season 3

The second season of Schitt's Creek a Canadian television sitcom created by Daniel Levy and father Eugene Levy premiered on January 12, 2016, and concluded on March 29, 2016, on CBC Television. The season aired 13 episodes and saw the return of the characters Johnny Rose, Moira Rose, David Rose & Alexis Rose. The season was once again produced by Not a Real Company Productions.

The season featured the same starring cast that was introduced during the first season, however now Dustin Milligan was promoted from starring to regular status. Robin Duke joined the series as a regular character named Wendy.

On February 17, 2016, the CBC announced they renewed the show for a third season.

== Cast and characters ==
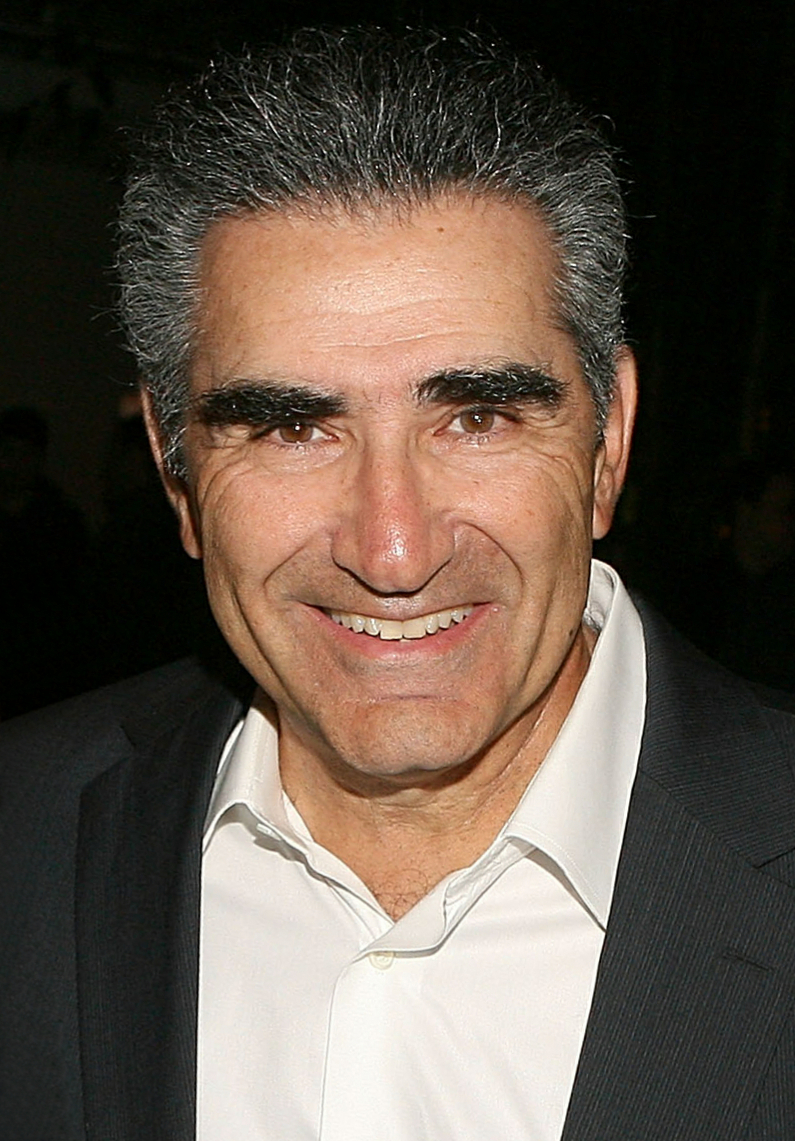
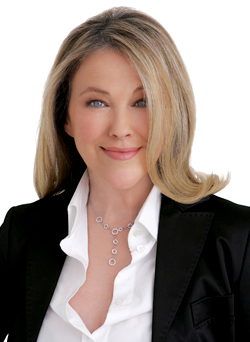
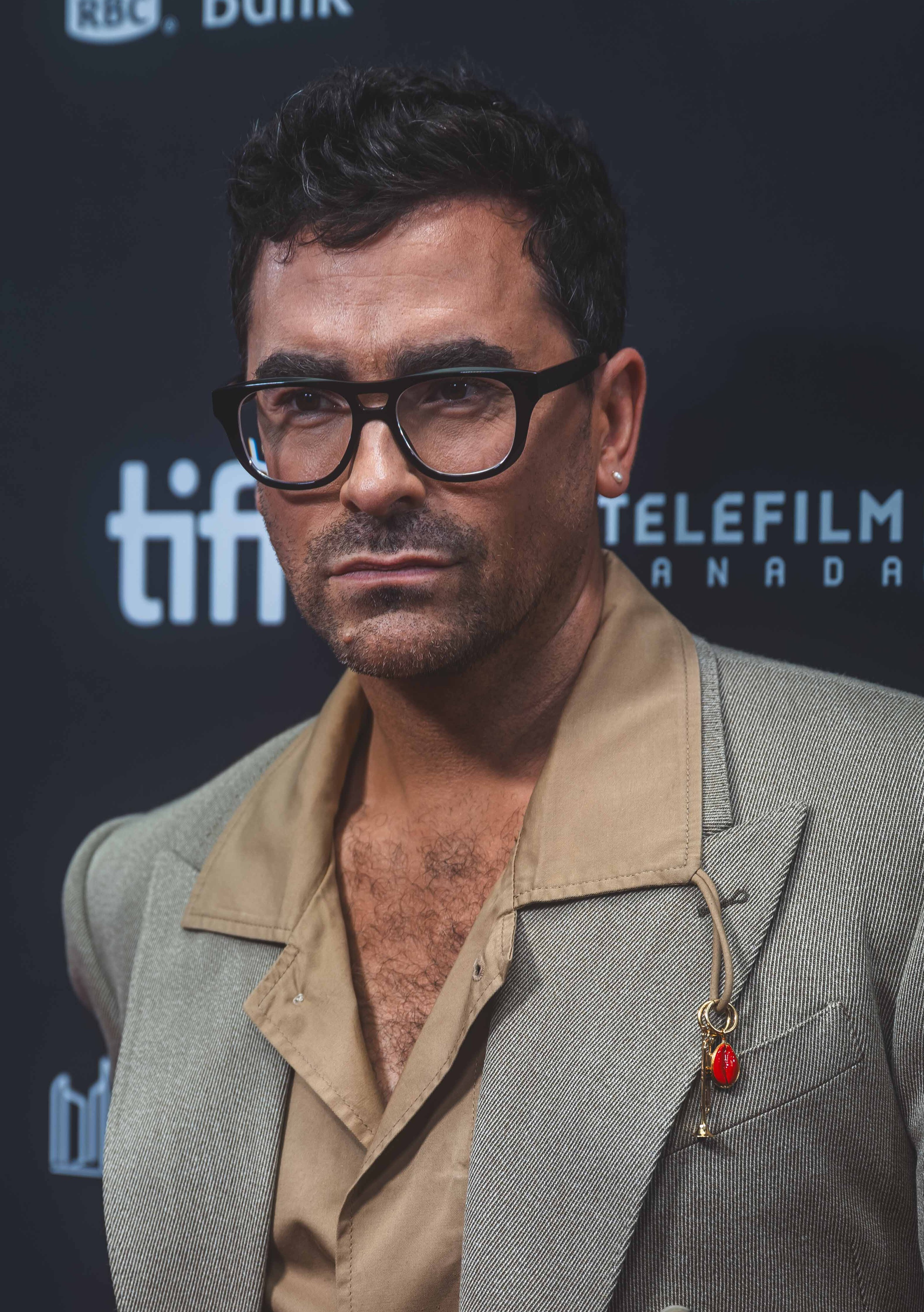
Eugene Levy (Johnny Rose), Catherine O'Hara (Moira Rose), and Dan Levy (David Rose)
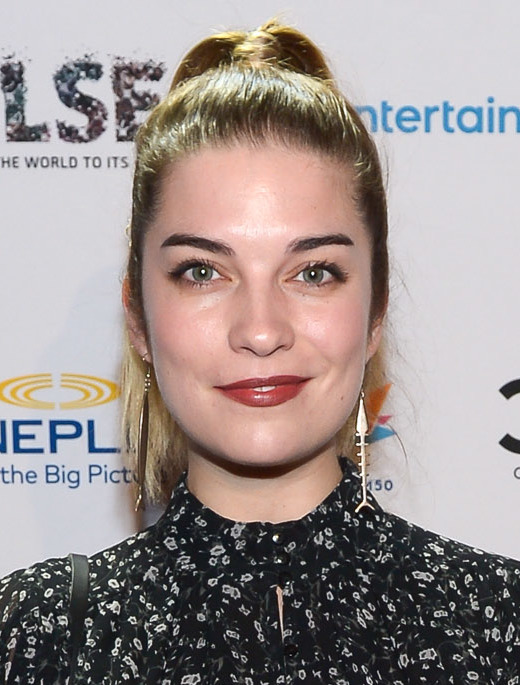
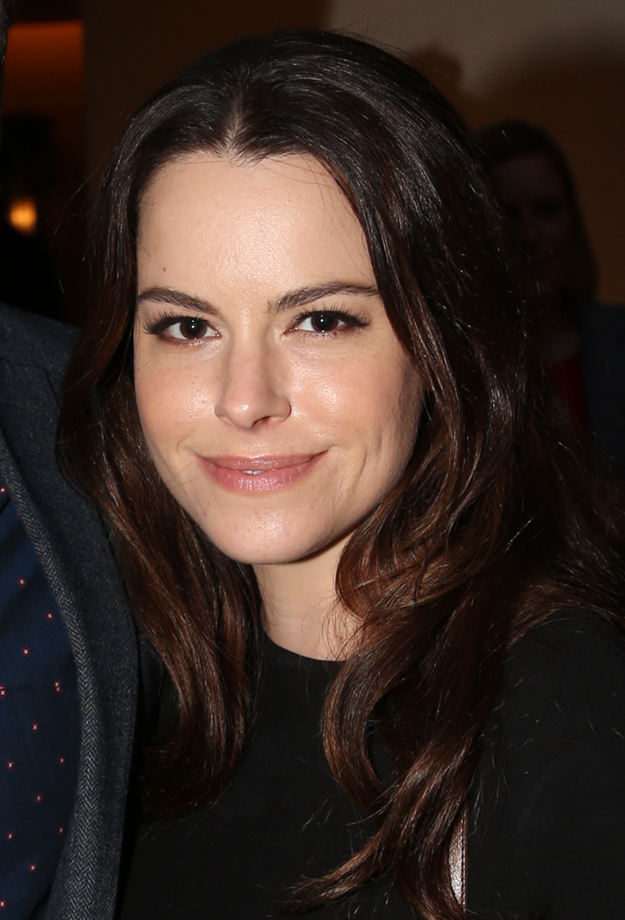
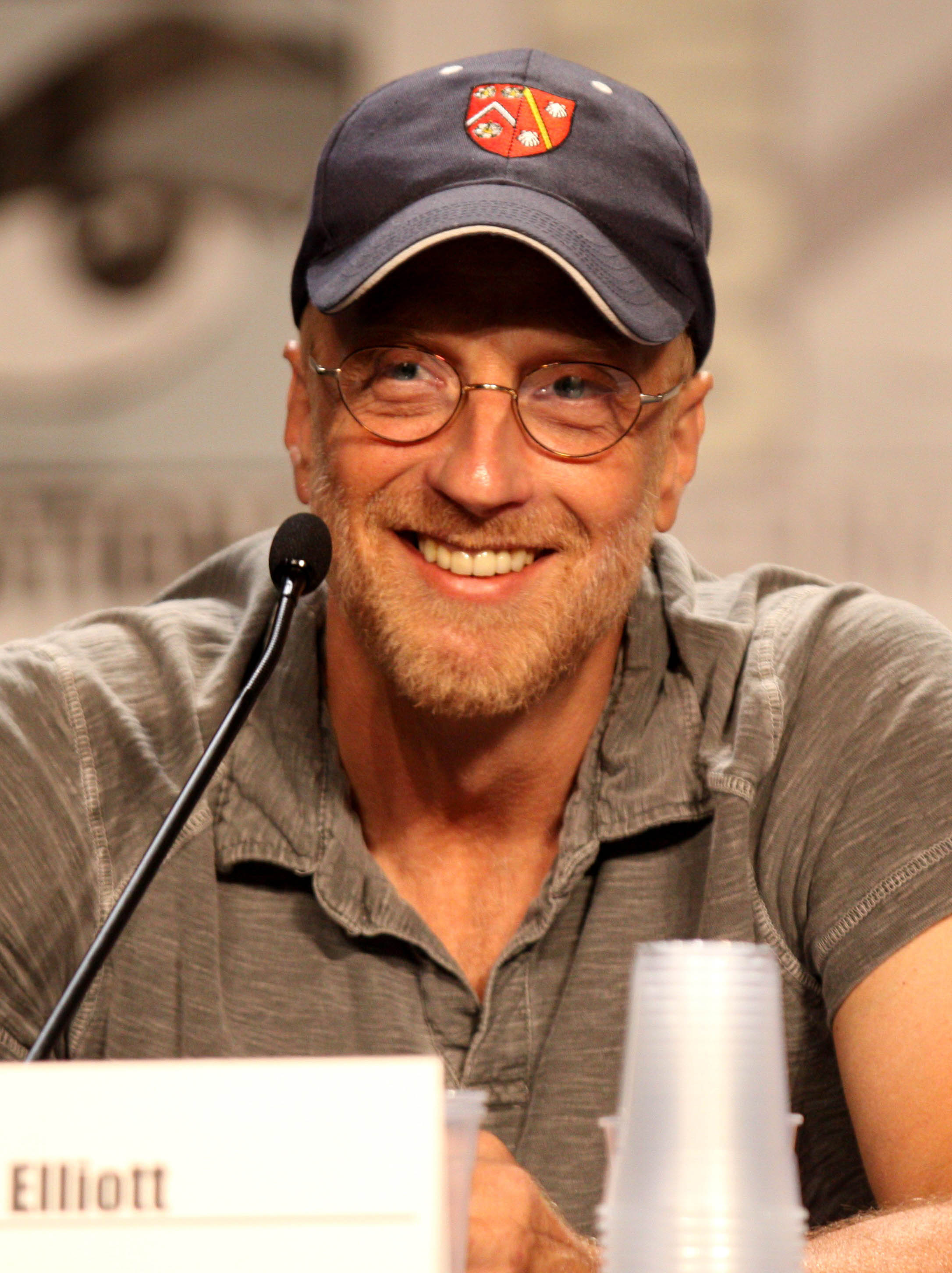
Annie Murphy (Alexis Rose), Emily Hampshire (Stevie Budd), and Chris Elliott (Roland Schitt)

=== Main ===
- Eugene Levy as Johnny Rose
- Catherine O'Hara as Moira Rose
- Daniel Levy as David Rose
- Annie Murphy as Alexis Rose
- Jennifer Robertson as Jocelyn Schitt
- Tim Rozon as Mutt Schitt
- Emily Hampshire as Stevie Budd
- Dustin Milligan as Ted Mullens
- Chris Elliott as Roland Schitt

=== Starring ===
- Sarah Levy as Twyla Sands (Note: This actor was only credited in the episodes in which they appeared.)
- John Hemphill as Bob Currie
- Karen Robinson as Ronnie Lee
- Rizwan Manji as Ray Butani
- Robin Duke as Wendy Kurtz

=== Recurring ===
- Marilyn Bellfontaine as Gwen Currie

=== Special Guest Stars ===
- Shakura S'Aida as Lena
- Lili Conner as Grace
- Jasmin Geljo as Ivan
- Steve Lund as Jake
- Sarah Power as Tennessee
- John Bourgeois as Don Taylor
- Sherry Miller as Bev Taylor

== Episodes ==
No. overall	No. in season	Title	Directed by	Written by	Original release date	Prod. code	Canadian viewers (millions)
14	1	"Finding David"	Jerry Ciccoritti	Daniel Levy	January 12, 2016	262452-14	0.808
David takes Roland's truck and a valuable bag of Moira's and disappears from the town. Alexis is unsure about rejecting Ted's marriage proposal while working on her relationship with Mutt. The family finds David staying with an Amish family eager for him to leave. The Rose family convinces David to return to Schitt's Creek.
15	2	"Family Dinner"	Jerry Ciccoritti	David West Read	January 12, 2016	262452-15	0.775
After Alexis accuses her of being unable to cook, Moira decides to prepare chicken enchiladas for her family with the help of David. The two attempt to cook the dish but struggle with simple cooking terms and are unable to complete the recipe. Johnny searches for an office for his consulting business, and Bob offers to let him work in his garage. Alexis speaks to Ted about his proposal and is upset when he states that he intends to propose again when they're both ready.
16	3	"Jazzagals"	Paul Fox	Michael Short	January 19, 2016	262452-16	N/A
Moira tries to join the town's a capella group but is upset when she realizes she is the weakest singer in the group. David attempts to reconcile with Stevie, who rejected his offer to move to New York City with him. Alexis enjoys her new relationship with Mutt but is upset when he tells her he wants more time apart. Johnny attempts to help out at Bob's Garage in return for the free office space but accidentally sells a car that was in the garage for repairs.
17	4	"Estate Sale"	Jerry Ciccoritti	Teresa Pavlinek	January 26, 2016	262452-17	0.656
Moira and Johnny attend an estate auction and attempt to buy a memory foam mattress, but Jocelyn wins it when she outbids the Roses. However, later, Roland comes by and tries to sell Johnny the mattress after finding it lacks enough bounce during lovemaking for him and Jocelyn. Johnny buys the mattress, but he and Moira remain disgusted by its history. Roland requests David's help buying a blouse for Jocelyn at the Blouse Barn, and the two disagree on what Roland should purchase. Mutt gives Alexis a bicycle, and she admits that she never learned to ride one, so Mutt teaches her with some encouraging words from Twyla. Later, Alexis teaches David to ride a bicycle.
18	5	"Bob's Bagels"	Paul Fox	Chris Pozzebon and Daniel Levy	February 2, 2016	262452-18	N/A
When asked about potential business ideas, Johnny uses a bagel shop as an example. However, despite Johnny's protests, Roland and Bob take him seriously and begin making plans to sell bagels. After Bob arranges for someone to build the oven and bake the bagels, Johnny tells them he will not run a bagel company. Alexis gets sick, and Moira tries to keep her distance despite Alexis needing help before coming around to discover a tiny bit of parenting instinct. Even though he previously voiced his dislike of their clothes, David applies for a job at the Blouse Barn and is hired.
19	6	"Moira vs. Town Council"	Jerry Ciccoritti	Daniel Levy	February 9, 2016	262452-19	N/A
Moira wants to plant flowers in front of the motel and goes to the town council. The rest of the members are impressed when she stands up to Roland. David begins making changes at the Blouse Barn to revitalize the business but makes expensive purchases for himself after mistakenly thinking he can use them as a tax write-off. Mutt shaves off his beard, which causes tension with Alexis. She says that his beard was her favorite feature of his, which upsets him. They discover that they seem to have nothing to talk about and break up.
20	7	"The Candidate"	Paul Fox	Kevin White	February 16, 2016	262452-20	N/A
Johnny considers running for town council, but Moira convinces him not to, and she later finds herself interested in running. Alexis tries to meet with Twyla because she is bored without Mutt in her life, but Twyla is upset because Alexis convinced her to break up with Mutt and then dated him herself. Alexis learns to spend time alone with herself. David and Stevie go out drinking at a dive bar to meet other single people, but they end up briefly kissing each other again, then again deciding it was not a good idea.
21	8	"Milk Money"	Paul Fox	Michael Short	February 23, 2016	262452-21	N/A
After finding out that the raw milk of Bob's that he used in his coffee is expensive, Johnny decides to get into the raw milk business. Alexis says she can source some through her ex-boyfriend Ted, but misremembers 12 pints as 12 "things" and ends up getting much more than they wanted (12 ten-gallon milk churns). They plan to try and sell the milk anyway with Roland's help but get pulled over by cops. Roland's nervous attitude prompts the officers to search the truck and force them to dump the raw milk out because unpasteurized milk is illegal. David helps Jocelyn, Moira's opponent in the town council elections, select a wardrobe, which upsets Moira, who accuses her son of "stabbing her in the back".
22	9	"Moira's Nudes"	Jerry Ciccoritti	David West Read	March 1, 2016	262452-22	N/A
David gets a company car, to the surprise of his family. Johnny must pay his $560 tab at the local restaurant but does not have the funds, so he reluctantly asks his son, David, for financial help. Moira searches for nude photos she took when she was younger but only finds pictures of herself with O. J. Simpson and Robert Blake. She becomes upset, which surprises Stevie and David, and she admits she liked how she looked in those photos. Alexis complains about needing money and is hired as a receptionist at Ted's veterinary clinic.
23	10	"Ronnie's Party"	Paul Fox	Matt Kippen	March 8, 2016	262452-23	N/A
Moira and Johnny ask Ronnie to organize a meeting to support her campaign, thinking they will receive support from the lesbian community. After the meeting begins, Johnny realizes that Ronnie organized a meeting with the Women's Business Association, of which she is a member. Moira does a poor job of adjusting her speech to the new demographic. Alexis struggles at her new job at Ted's clinic but impresses Ted with her ability to connect with patients and sell products. David offers emotional support to his boss's 14-year-old stepdaughter when she gets her period.
24	11	"The Motel Guest"	Jerry Ciccoritti	Kevin White	March 15, 2016	262452-24	N/A
Roland, briefly separated from Jocelyn, stays in an adjacent motel room and plays loud music, disturbing Johnny and Moira. (However, this relies on a continuity error in which Roland’s room, room 5, is adjacent to room 6 rather than on the other side of the office). David helps Alexis look for an apartment but wants it for himself and attempts to talk her out of renting it.
25	12	"Lawn Signs"	Jerry Ciccoritti	Kevin White	March 22, 2016	262452-25	N/A
Moira says her campaign signs have gone missing, and accusations and insinuations begin. Later, Stevie discovers that Moira had thrown the signs away, and Moira confides to Johnny that she was just creating election drama. Meanwhile, Jocelyn resigns from the race due to stress, leaving Moira as the only candidate in the race. Later Wendy encounters problems regarding the Blouse Barn name, so David and Alexis offer legal assistance. Ultimately, they negotiate with a huge clothing retailer to license the name, and the deal is so lucrative Wendy can retire. She gives David a large check as thanks, and the family discusses how to spend it.
26	13	"Happy Anniversary"	Paul Fox	Daniel Levy	March 29, 2016	262452-26	N/A
While celebrating their anniversary at an upscale restaurant, Johnny and Moira encounter a couple from their previous life, Bev and Don. Jocelyn and Roland show up unexpectedly and join the table. Bev and Don insult the residents and the town of Schitt's Creek throughout dinner, not realizing Johnny and Moira have been staying there and that Roland is the mayor. When Johnny has had enough of the insults, he tells off Don and stands up for Schitt's Creek and, most importantly, for his friends, Roland and Jocelyn. Alexis meets Mutt's new girlfriend, Tennessee, and calls her Tallahassee. Alexis and David enjoy themselves at Mutt's annual party in his barn; in the end they are joined by their parents and dance together as a family.

== Reception and release ==
=== Critical response ===
The second season of Schitt's Creek was positively received, with improved critical reception over the first season. On Rotten Tomatoes, it has an approval rating of 100% based on 6 reviews with an average rating of 9/10. Along with the rest of the series, the season grew in popularity after debuting on Netflix in January 2017.

=== Awards and nominations ===
The second season received 13 nominations at the 5th Canadian Screen Awards, as well as other award wins and nominations for individual actors and directors.

=== Release ===
The season premiered on January 12, 2016, and with a two-episode premiere, the season concluded on March 29, 2016, with 13 episodes. Starting in the season, the American distributor of the series, Pop TV, moved the series to an 8:00 pm ET/PT time slot with an encore broadcast at 11:00 pm ET/PT.
