= Happy Ending (Schitt's Creek) =

Series finale of Schitt's Creek

- Schitt's Creek episode
- Patrick and David at their wedding
- Episode no.: Season 6 Episode 14
- Directed by: Andrew Cividino; Daniel Levy
- Written by: Daniel Levy
- Cinematography by: David A. Makin
- Editing by: Trevor Ambrose
- Production code: 262452-80
- Original air date: April 7, 2020
- Running time: 25 minutes

Guest appearances
- Karen Robinson as Ronnie Lee; John Hemphill as Bob Currie; Rizwan Manji as Ray Butani; Deborah Tennant as Marcy Brewer; Ted Whittall as Clint Brewer

Episode chronology
← Previous "Start Spreading the News"	Next → —

"Happy Ending" is the series finale of the Canadian television sitcom Schitt's Creek. It serves as the 14th episode of the sixth season and the 80th overall. The episode was written by series creator and executive producer Daniel Levy, who codirected it with Andrew Cividino. The episode originally aired in Canada on CBC Television and on Pop TV in the United States on April 7, 2020, where it was followed directly after by a one-hour documentary depicting the making of the final season.

The series, co-created by Levy and his father Eugene Levy, follows the trials and tribulations of the formerly wealthy Rose family when they are forced to relocate to Schitt's Creek, a small town they once purchased as a joke. In the episode, David Rose prepares for his wedding with Patrick Brewer but finds that his plans for their special day are forced to be changed due to a rainstorm. In addition, David's parents, Johnny and Moira, along with his sister Alexis, all prepare to come together to say goodbye before going their separate ways.

The initial script for the finale was written by Levy shortly after the series had been renewed for a sixth and final season. The episode features the guest appearances of Deborah Tennant and Ted Whittall as Patrick's parents and the return of Karen Robinson, John Hemphill, and Rizwan Manji in their recurring roles as Ronnie Lee, Bob Currie, and Ray Butani, respectively.

In Canada, "Happy Ending" was viewed by an estimated 1.22 million viewers, ranking 22nd amongst other Canadian shows that week. In the United States, the episode was viewed by half a million people and received a 0.18 rating among adults between the ages of 18 and 49, tying with the show's penultimate episode, "Start Spreading the News", as the highest-rated episode of the series in the US. "Happy Ending" received critical acclaim, with critics praising Levy's ability to conclude the series with a satisfying finale. The episode received eight Primetime Emmy Award nominations at the 72nd Primetime Emmy Awards and won four, including for Outstanding Supporting Actor in a Comedy Series, Outstanding Writing for a Comedy Series, and Outstanding Directing for a Comedy Series.

== Synopsis ==
On the day of his wedding, David finds out that his special day has been interrupted by a rainstorm. After getting a massage (which inadvertently ends with him receiving a "happy ending"), David is informed that the wedding will now be held at the town hall. When the original officiant cancels, David's mother, Moira, fills in. In the town hall, David and Patrick are married. The next day, Johnny and Moira depart from Schitt's Creek en route to California.

== Production ==
Schitt's Creek began airing in the United States on Pop TV since 2015. On March 21, 2019, the series was renewed for a sixth and final season of 14 episodes, which would air on Pop TV in the US, and CBC Television in Canada.

"Happy Ending" was written by Schitt's Creek co-creator and executive producer Daniel Levy, who directed the episode alongside Andrew Cividino. Writing for the season took about a month, as Levy tried to make sure he was giving each character the ending they deserved. However, the finale was written in the span of three hours, with Levy stating that the final script made him, along with other cast members, cry several times during the episode's final table read. As there weren't any minor characters with unresolved side stories, Levy was able to focus his attention mainly on addressing the Rose family.

Filming for the final season began in Hockley Valley, Ontario, and officially concluded on June 27, 2019. The episode was filmed on a low budget, and as a result, there were only three cameras present during the wedding scene. The last thing filmed for the season was the scene in which the Rose family say goodbye to one another, which depicted the cast members actually crying on set. Soon after filming wrapped, editing for the final season of the show occurred in late 2019 through November.

Produced by Kosta Orfanidis, the episode features the songs "Precious Love" by James Morrison and "The Best" by Tina Turner, both of which were actually sung by show's Jazzagals due to the episode's low budget. Noah Reid also sings the song "Always Be My Baby" by Mariah Carey in the role of Patrick, and the song "This Will Be Our Year" by The Zombies appears during the closing credits of the episode. Additionally, the "Viking pope" costume worn by Catherine O'Hara in the episode was designed by Ana Sorys, the show's wig technician who had to create a total of twenty-five wigs for the final season of Schitt's Creek.

== Reception ==
=== Viewership ===
"Happy Ending" was first broadcast in Canada and the United States on April 7, 2020, where it was followed directly after by a one-hour documentary depicting the production of the final season. In its Canadian airing on CBC Television, the episode was watched by 1.22 million people, ranking 22nd amongst other Canadian shows that aired in the same week. In the United States, the episode and the documentary were viewed respectively by half a million people on Pop TV, with "Happy Ending" gaining a 0.18 rating from the Nielsen Media Research firm, tying with the show's penultimate episode "Start Spreading the News" as the highest-rated episode of the series in the US.

=== Critical response ===
Following its airing, "Happy Ending" was met with positive reviews from critics. From Vox, Constance Grady praised the ending of the episode by stating that "the finale is a goodbye not only from us to them but from them to each other. And it's enormously effective." Glen Weldon, writing for NPR, expressed his appreciation for each character's development throughout the show, and stated that the finale was "long on grace notes for various characters". IndieWire journalist LaToya Ferguson wrote that the episode "definitely leaves the audience wanting more [...] simply because it's hard to say goodbye to these characters. Wanting to know what the future holds for the Roses and [...] everyone in Schitt's Creek [...] makes all the sense in the world. But that's also a different chapter in a different story." Writing for The A.V. Club, Gwen Ihnat gave the episode a grade rating of an A−, simply remarking the fact that "We already know how it will all end; all that's left are the goodbyes." Vulture's Maggie Fremont gave the episode 5 out of 5 stars, lauding the show's journey to its finale, and stating that it was "a pleasure [...] to see" as it gave "all of its characters the happy endings they deserve."

The episode was listed as one of the best television episodes of 2020 by many BuzzFeed News and The Washington Post. In 2023, BuzzFeed listed it as one of the "35 perfect episodes" of all time.

=== Accolades ===
"Happy Ending" received eight Primetime Emmy Award nominations at the 72nd Primetime Emmy Awards and won for Outstanding Supporting Actor in a Comedy Series (Daniel Levy), Outstanding Writing for a Comedy Series (Daniel Levy), Outstanding Directing for a Comedy Series (Daniel Levy and Andrew Cividino), and Outstanding Contemporary Costumes (Debra Hanson and Darci Cheyne). To celebrate, the show's cast and crew held an exclusive party in Toronto, Ontario, in which they also had to follow various health and safety procedures due to the COVID-19 pandemic in Canada. On October 28, 2020, the Directors Guild of Canada gave Daniel Levy and Andrew Cividino the award for Outstanding Directorial Achievement in a Comedy Series for their directing work on this episode. The following year, Schitt's Creek as a whole received 21 nominations from the Canadian Screen Awards, eight for this episode, including for Best Direction and Best Writing in a Comedy Series.

Award	Date of ceremony	Category	Nominee(s)	Result	Ref.
Canadian Screen Awards	May 20, 2021	Best Direction in a Comedy Series	Andrew Cividino and Daniel Levy	Won	
Canadian Screen Awards	May 20, 2021	Best Writing in a Comedy Series	Daniel Levy	Won	
Canadian Screen Awards	May 20, 2021	Best Production Design or Art Direction in a Fiction Program	Brendan Smith and Joe Susin	Nominated	
Canadian Screen Awards	May 20, 2021	Best Costume Design	Debra Hanson	Won	
Canadian Screen Awards	May 20, 2021	Best Achievement in Makeup	Candice Ornstein and Lucky Bromhead	Nominated	
Canadian Screen Awards	May 20, 2021	Best Achievement in Hair	Annastasia Cucullo and Ana Sorys	Won	
Creative Arts Emmy Award	September 14–17; 19, 2020	Outstanding Contemporary Costumes	Debra Hanson and Darci Cheyne	Won	
Creative Arts Emmy Award	September 14–17; 19, 2020	Outstanding Contemporary Hairstyling	Anastasia Cucullo and Ana Sorys	Nominated	
Creative Arts Emmy Award	September 14–17; 19, 2020	Outstanding Contemporary Makeup (Non-Prosthetic)	Candice Ornstein and Lucky Bromhead	Nominated	
Creative Arts Emmy Award	September 14–17; 19, 2020	Outstanding Single-Camera Picture Editing for a Comedy Series	Trevor Ambrose	Nominated	
Creative Arts Emmy Award	September 14–17; 19, 2020	Outstanding Sound Mixing for a Comedy or Drama Series (Half-Hour) and Animation	Bryan Day and Martin Lee	Nominated	
Directors Guild of Canada Awards	October 28, 2020	Outstanding Directorial Achievement in a Comedy Series	Daniel Levy and Andrew Cividino	Won	
Primetime Emmy Awards	September 20, 2020	Outstanding Supporting Actor in a Comedy Series	Daniel Levy	Won	
Primetime Emmy Awards	September 20, 2020	Outstanding Writing for a Comedy Series	Daniel Levy	Won	
Primetime Emmy Awards	September 20, 2020	Outstanding Directing for a Comedy Series	Daniel Levy and Andrew Cividino	Won	
