= Alexis Rose =

Fictional character from Schitt's Creek

- Schitt's Creek character
- Alexis Rose in the Schitt's Creek episode "RIP Moira Rose" (season 4, 2018)
- First appearance: "Our Cup Runneth Over" (2015)
- Last appearance: "Happy Ending" (2020)
- Created by: Dan Levy; Eugene Levy
- Portrayed by: Annie Murphy

In-universe information
- Full name: Alexis Claire Rose
- Gender: Female
- Occupation: Alexis Rose Communications business owner (current); receptionist at Ted's veterinarian clinic (former); socialite (former); reality star (former); teen model (former); child actor (former)
- Family: Johnny Rose (father); Moira Rose (mother); David Rose (brother)
- Significant others: Ted Mullens (ex-boyfriend/fiancè); Mutt Schitt (ex-boyfriend); Stavros (ex-boyfriend); Arthur (ex-lover)

Alexis Claire Rose is a fictional character in the Canadian sitcom Schitt's Creek, which aired on CBC and Pop TV from 2015 to 2020. Alexis, a member of the central Rose family, is introduced as the spoiled socialite daughter of Johnny and Moira Rose, and the younger sister of David Rose. Her early seasons storylines revolve around her efforts to adjust to life in Schitt's Creek after her family loses their fortune, as well as her romantic entanglements with locals Mutt Schitt and Ted Mullens. In later seasons, Alexis's story focuses on her educational pursuits and the establishment of her public relations business, Alexis Rose Communications, all while starting a new and serious relationship with Ted. For the fifth season episode "The Hospies", Alexis performs the song "A Little Bit Alexis", which was later released professionally by Annie Murphy on February 19, 2019.

Alexis Rose was portrayed by actress Annie Murphy for the series' entire 80-episode run. She secured the role after Alexis's initial portrayer, Abby Elliott, was unable to continue in the role when Schitt's Creek was picked up to series by the CBC. Murphy's performance has been largely praised by fans and critics, with some critics calling her the show's "breakout star". For her work as Alexis, Murphy was nominated for three Canadian Screen Awards and one Gracie Award, an award she won in 2019. In 2020, she won the Primetime Emmy Award for Outstanding Supporting Actress in a Comedy Series.

== Role in Schitt's Creek ==
Schitt's Creek follows the trials and tribulations of the once wealthy Rose family, who are banished to the titular town after losing their fortune to an embezzling business manager. A globetrotting socialite, Alexis is introduced as the self-absorbed adult daughter of Johnny (Eugene Levy) and Moira Rose (Catherine O'Hara) who has little time for Schitt's Creek or her family. She settles into town with the help of love interests Mutt Schitt (Tim Rozon) and Ted Mullens (Dustin Milligan) and eventually finds work as a receptionist at Ted's veterinary clinic. After these relationships fizzle out, Alexis decides to focus on her education by obtaining her high school diploma and enrolling at a local college. She ultimately opens her own public relations company, Alexis Rose Communications, following the completion of her college degree.

While living in Schitt's Creek, Alexis' relationships with her family begin to deepen, and after finishing her education in the fourth season, she also reunites with Ted, with whom she begins the first serious and mature relationship of her life, which strengthens throughout the fifth season, but Alexis is reluctant to leave her family when Ted invites her to accompany him on an extended career opportunity in the Galápagos Islands for some months. She eventually agrees and is set to leave with Ted, but because of a scheduling mix-up, she never makes it to the Islands. They thus settle on long-distance for a period, during which her PR career starts taking off. After some time, Ted pays Alexis a surprise visit at home to share the news that he got offered a permanent job in the Islands, which makes the two realize that, even though they love each other deeply, their lives are going into different directions, so they agree on a mutual break-up. In an attempt to cope with her heartbreak over Ted, Alexis briefly dates a retired man named Arthur (or 'Artie' for short) who is significantly older than her, to her family's dismay.

== Development ==
Alexis Rose was developed by Schitt's Creek co-creators Dan and Eugene Levy. The character was inspired by the wealthy real-life stars of programs like Keeping Up with the Kardashians and The Real Housewives franchise. The initial casting call described Alexis as a "selfish, ditzy socialite" and a young Goldie Hawn.

In the original unaired pilot presentation, Alexis Rose was portrayed by Abby Elliott. When Schitt's Creek was picked up to series by the CBC, Elliott was unable to commit, and a subsequent casting call was held in Los Angeles. According to Dan Levy, Murphy's audition stood out because of the "wonderfully natural likability" she brought to the role. Eugene was initially hesitant about her casting because he had envisioned Alexis as having blonde hair instead of Murphy's naturally brunette locks. Murphy dyed her hair blonde upon booking the role.

== Characterization and themes ==
=== Personality and personal style ===
Alexis arrives in Schitt's Creek as a highly self-involved "celebutante". She is often comically oblivious and frequently misinterprets the actions of those around her. Alexis is also generous and "kindhearted", embracing the potential of nearly every individual or opportunity she comes across. As summarized by Vulture, her presence is "part calculated humblebrag, part genuine warmth, and part rich bitch".

Alexis wears a "bohemian" wardrobe, which is inspired by the likes of Sienna Miller. According to Dan Levy, the character's style is also a reflection of her time spent traveling in New York and Europe. As such, she is frequently seen sporting designers such as Isabel Marant and Derek Lam – even when doing physical labor as part of her community service. These high-end clothes are meant to serve as a reminder to the audience of the family's prior wealth.

=== Voice and mannerisms ===
Alexis speaks with a vocal fry and sometimes uses exaggerated hand gestures. According to Murphy, she began saying "Ew, David" in a peculiar way without realizing it, and the phrase eventually made its way onto welcome mats, T-shirts, and at least one license plate.

== Reception ==
=== Critical reception ===
Murphy's turn as Alexis Rose has garnered much positive press, with some critics declaring her the "breakout star" of the series. In an early review, LaToya Ferguson of The A.V. Club called her take on the partying socialite "scarily amazing". People Magazine's Gillian Telling also noted that Murphy not only held her own against her more seasoned co-stars, she "occasionally steals the scene". As Schitt's Creek gained a larger following in its later seasons, Murphy received additional praise. In a season 4 review, Michael Ausiello of TVLine called her performance a "magic trick" which balanced relatability, sympathy, and charm. Vanity Fair's Richard Lawson was also complimentary, noting Murphy and Alexis's ability to maintain her "winning bite" while adding a sense of "kindness and intellectual curiosity". Joe Reid of Decider declared David and Alexis "the show's heart and soul" before approvingly adding that "Murphy's delivery is like a vaudeville interpretation of what a spoiled rich girl would sound like". Caroline Framke of Vox similarly agreed noting that Dan Levy and Annie Murphy were Schitt Creek's "backbone and beating heart".

=== Accolades ===
For her work as Alexis, Murphy has been nominated for three Canadian Screen Awards for Best Performance by an Actress in a Continuing Leading Comedic Role in 2016, 2018, and 2019. In 2019, Murphy was awarded the Gracie Award for Actress in a Breakthrough Role. In 2020, Murphy received a Primetime Emmy Award win for Outstanding Supporting Actress in a Comedy Series. Murphy has also received several awards and nominations as a member of the Schitt's Creek ensemble cast. This includes two Canadian Screen Awards for Best Comedy in 2016 and 2019; one ACTRA Award for Member's Choice Series Ensemble in 2019; and two Dorian Awards for TV Comedy of the Year and Unsung TV Show of the Year in 2019. The cast also received a Canadian Screen Award nomination for Best Comedy in 2017; two ACTRA Award nominations for Member's Choice Ensemble in 2017 and 2018; one GLAAD Award nomination in 2019; one Television Critics Association Award in 2019; and one Critic's Choice Award nomination – a first for a Canadian comedy – in 2019.
