= Moira Rose =

Fictional character from Schitt's Creek

- Schitt's Creek character
- Moira Rose in the Schitt's Creek episode "Opening Night" (season 3, 2017)
- First appearance: "Our Cup Runneth Over" (2015)
- Last appearance: "Happy Ending" (2020)
- Created by: Dan Levy; Eugene Levy
- Portrayed by: Catherine O'Hara

In-universe information
- Gender: Female
- Occupation: Actor (current); Town Councillor (former); Socialite (former); Secretary (former)
- Family: Dee Dee (sister)
- Spouse: Johnny Rose
- Children: David Rose (son); Alexis Rose (daughter)

Moira Rose is a fictional character in the Canadian sitcom Schitt's Creek, first aired on CBC and Pop from 2015 to 2020. Moira is introduced as the eccentric former soap opera star wife of Johnny Rose and mother of their adult children, David and Alexis. She is often portrayed as the family member most resistant to life in Schitt's Creek – viewing their loss of fortune as temporary. In later seasons, Moira's story becomes more community-oriented as she forms closer relationships with the townspeople.

Catherine O'Hara portrayed Moira throughout the 80-episode run of the series, cast by her long-time collaborator, and Schitt's Creek co-creator, Eugene Levy. Her work as Moira garnered high praise, winning several awards for the role, including five consecutive Canadian Screen Awards; one ACTRA Award; one Canadian Comedy Award; two Television Critics Association nominations for Individual Achievement in Comedy; two Primetime Emmy nominations for Outstanding Lead Actress in a Comedy Series, winning one in 2020; one Screen Actors Guild Award nomination for Outstanding Performance by a Female Actor in a Comedy Series; and a Golden Globe Award in 2021.

== Concept and casting ==
The character of Moira Rose was developed by Schitt's Creek's father-son co-creators Eugene and Dan Levy. She (along with the rest of the Rose family) was inspired by the wealthy reality TV stars of such programs as Keeping Up with the Kardashians and The Real Housewives franchise. The Levys always envisioned the character to be a former soap star and socialite, but say that O'Hara brought an "extreme affectation" to Moira which made her "so much funnier than [we] imagined". O'Hara was the creators' first choice for the role. She was offered it by Eugene Levy, whom she has known since the 1970s. They first met at The Second City improv troupe in Toronto and went on to co-star in SCTV and several Christopher Guest films. She was initially reluctant, citing "laziness" and an aversion to long-term projects. Levy subsequently contacted another actress for the role, but was ultimately able to convince O'Hara to participate in the pilot presentation by assuring her that she was not obligated to commit to the full series. When the show was picked up to series by the CBC, O'Hara agreed to continue in the role.

== Design and costumes ==
Moira wears a Daphne Guinness-inspired wardrobe rendered in almost exclusively black and white tones. The structured, designer garments set her apart from the local residents and serve as a kind of "armor" against the influences of Schitt's Creek to which Moira remains resistant. Away from the townspeople, she is no different – often wearing a waistcoat over her silk pajamas. Moira also wears a wide assortment of designer wigs, which range in style from a platinum blonde bob to short, red, and curly. Each wig is selected, in part, to reflect Moira's mood or state of mind in the scene. All of these design choices come from O'Hara, who suggested the character's overall look in her first meetings with the Levys. Dan Levy also says Moira's wardrobe is intentionally designed to remind the audience of the Rose family's former wealthy standing.

== Characterization ==
Moira is, as described by Matt and Haley Brennan of Paste Magazine, "spoiled, eccentric, [and] exceedingly dramatic". Nearly everything she does, whether it is attending a town council meeting or babysitting a child, is completed with a kind of theatric flair. Moira often pairs these grand displays with biting sarcasm, such as in the pilot episode when she tells the motel clerk that all she needs in her room is a "bathtub and a long extension cord" after the Roses have lost their wealth. But on rare occasions, Moira lets the ego and bluster fade – displaying both a tenderness toward her children and a distinct despair over the loss of her former life.

To facilitate her over-the-top persona, Moira utilizes an affected accent and frequently peppers her vocabulary with arcane words like "frippet" and "pettifogging". As noted by The Atlantic, she also "adopts an affectation that transforms monosyllabic and disyllabic words into something simultaneously lofty and ridiculous". O'Hara stated that her character's unique – what some have called Canadian dainty – accent is a kind of "souvenir" from Moira's world travels. Her archaic vocabulary also expands throughout the series, with O'Hara often adding her own select phrases to the scripts.

According to O'Hara, Moira thinks about leaving Schitt's Creek "every day". Unlike her husband and children, who largely settle into Schitt's Creek throughout the series, Moira remains resistant to living in the town long-term. Because of that, her only long-term commitment to the town has been a seat on the town council. Her time in Schitt's Creek nevertheless allows her to develop closer relationships with her family, which evolve from largely disconnected to occasionally sweet and loving as time passes.

== Fictional biography ==
Moira Rose is a formerly wealthy daytime soap star, most known for her role as Vivian Blake on Sunrise Bay. She and her husband, Johnny Rose (Eugene Levy), the former CEO of the second-largest video rental company in North America, share two adult children, David (Dan Levy) and Alexis (Annie Murphy). David is a former New York City gallerist and later co-owner of Rose Apothecary, while Alexis is a former socialite and later owner of her own public relations business. Moira has one known younger sister named Dee Dee (Jennifer Irwin) who resides in Buffalo, New York. She grew up in a small town not unlike Schitt's Creek, where she took pride in her self-sufficiency and ability to master the basics of everyday living. After smoking a joint at the Hawaiian-themed yard party organised by Jocelyn and Roland Schitt (S01E10: Honeymoon), Moira reminisces about her youth. She recalls being "crowned Miss Snow Queen at 16" before she "moved to "the city with my driving instructor" where she acted as a "hand model at a microwave trade show". The scene implies that this trade show may have been where Moira first met Johnny, recalling that she asked, "Who's the eyebrows buying everyone's drinks?" If so, this meeting would have predated Moira cutting the ribbon at one of Johnny's video store openings, which is often described as the couple's first encounter. This line also serves as a playful nod to Eugene Levy's famously bushy eyebrows. Her big acting break came when she was cast as Sally Bowles in a production of Cabaret after the director spotted her working at a local gas station deli. Moira would go on to act in a number of theater productions before being cast in Sunrise Bay, where she stayed for six and a half seasons. During her time as an actress, Moira met her future husband at the grand opening of one of his video rental stores. The two married sometime later and have remained married for many years.

Moira is the matriarch of the Rose family. A previously inattentive mother, she often struggles to connect with and care for her now adult children. Her attempts at mothering are often poorly executed or awkward (such as the time she forgot her daughter's middle name). However, in recognition of her caring qualities, Jocelyn and Ronnie give their unexpected baby the middle name Moira—full name Roland Moira Schitt— after Moira delivers Jocelyn to the hospital while their husbands are preparing for the singles weekend organised by Alexis (S04E12: Singles Week). Her son, David, is in many ways her favoured child;. As the series progresses, she also begins to establish a relationship with her daughter, Alexis. Moira's closest confidant is her husband, Johnny, whose "straight man" demeanor balances and steadies her bombastic tendencies. This pairing continuously highlights Moira's ability to be loving and kind even when she has difficulty expressing those feelings to others.

Outside of her family, Moira's closest connections are with high school teacher Jocelyn Schitt (Jennifer Robertson) and members of the Jazzagals a cappella group. Jocelyn and her husband, mayor Roland Schitt (Chris Elliott), are some of the first people to show the Roses hospitality when they move to Schitt's Creek. Moira is reluctant to return this kindness, but by the end of the first season displays glimmers of gratitude when she gifts Jocelyn one of her designer fur coats. This relationship grows when Moira joins the Jazzagals, a singing group founded by Jocelyn. While a part of this group, Moira also forms bonds with fellow members Ronnie Lee (Karen Robinson) and Twyla Sands (Sarah Levy). Her relationship with Ronnie also extends to their work on the town council – work they share with Roland, who sometimes frustrates both Ronnie and Moira.

== Reception ==
=== Critical reception ===
O'Hara has received widespread praise for her work as Moira throughout the series. Cultural critic Glen Weldon described Moira as the role that won O'Hara the most acclaim of her career. In an early review, Gillian Telling of People Magazine suggested that her portrayal on the series "might be her finest character work ever". Paste Magazine's Erica Lies called her a "standout", and said "the entire show is worth watching just to see her meltdown as she gives acting lessons to middle school teens or drunkenly shoot[s] a commercial for a terrible winery". As the series gained a larger following after its release on Netflix in 2017, O'Hara received even more acclaim from critics. Michael Ausiello of TVLine noted that her work as Moira was "even more uproarious – and heartfelt – than the deafening buzz lets on". Vanity Fair's Richard Lawson also heaped on praise, calling O'Hara's turn "a thrill of a performance". The Daily Beast's Matt Wilstein suggested that O'Hara was "at the top of her game" and "deserves to win all the awards her character Moira Rose never could". Logo's Lester Fabian Brathwaite went further, and called her performance as Moira "the embodiment of perfection".

=== Accolades ===
O'Hara won her first Canadian Screen Award for Best Performance by an Actress in a Continuing Leading Comedic Role for her work as Moira in 2016. She won this award again in 2017, 2018, 2019 and 2020, tying (with her own Schitt's Creek castmate Emily Hampshire) the record for the most Canadian Screen Awards won by a comedic actress. In 2016, she was also awarded an ACTRA Award for Best Performance – Female, and in 2019, the Canadian Comedy Awards named her the Comedic Artist of the Year. This same year, she also received a Television Critics Association Award nomination for Individual Achievement in Comedy and a Primetime Emmy Award nomination for Outstanding Lead Actress in a Comedy Series.

As part of the Schitt's Creek ensemble cast, O'Hara has won two Canadian Screen Awards for Best Comedy in 2016 and 2019, also receiving a nomination in 2017. O'Hara won an additional ACTRA Award with the cast for Member's Choice Series Ensemble in 2019, an award for which the cast was also nominated in 2017 and 2018. The cast also received its first Dorian Award, GLAAD Award, Critics’ Choice, Primetime Emmy Award, and Television Critics Association Award nominations in 2019, from which they won two Dorian Awards for TV Comedy of the Year and Unsung TV Show of the Year. She won the Primetime Emmy Award for Outstanding Lead Actress in a Comedy Series in 2020.
