= David Rose (Schitt's Creek) =

Fictional character from Schitt's Creek

- Schitt's Creek character
- Dan Levy as David Rose in the Schitt's Creek episode "The Throuple" (season 3, 2017)
- First appearance: "Our Cup Runneth Over" (2015)
- Last appearance: "Happy Ending" (2020)
- Created by: Dan Levy; Eugene Levy
- Portrayed by: Dan Levy

In-universe information
- Full name: David Rose
- Gender: Male
- Occupation: Rose Apothecary business owner (current); Brand Manager: Blouse Barn (former); Gallerist (former); Actor: Dateline, "Valu-Mart victim." (former); Child Model: GAP (former)
- Family: Johnny Rose (father); Moira Rose (mother); Alexis Rose (sister)
- Spouse: Patrick Brewer
- Significant others: Stevie Budd (ex-lover and best friend); Jake (ex-lover); Sebastien Raine (ex-boyfriend)
- Religion: Christianity and Judaism
- Birthday: January 2, 1982

David Rose is a fictional character in the Canadian sitcom Schitt's Creek, which aired on the CBC and Pop TV from 2015 to 2020. David, a member of the central Rose family, is introduced as the spoiled adult son of Johnny and Moira Rose, and the older brother of Alexis Rose. His initial stories revolve around his attempts to adjust to the family's sudden loss of wealth and subsequent banishment to Schitt's Creek, a small town his father purchased as a joke for his birthday years earlier. As the series progresses, David's story focuses on his small business, Rose Apothecary, and his romantic relationship with Patrick Brewer.

The character was portrayed by Dan Levy – who created the series alongside his father, Canadian actor Eugene Levy – for the entirety of the series' 80 episodes. His performance as David has been largely praised by critics and fans, earning him four consecutive Canadian Screen Award nominations and one nomination and one win at the MTV Movie & TV Awards for Best Comedic Performance and a Primetime Emmy Award win.

David's character also garnered attention as one of the first openly pansexual characters depicted on television. The casual treatment of his sexuality and the absence of any homophobia has also been noted as rare for television. In 2019, Schitt's Creek won two Dorian Awards and was nominated for a GLAAD Award for its representation of LGBT characters.

== Fictional biography ==
Schitt's Creek chronicles the lives of the once wealthy Rose family, which is forced to move to the small titular town after losing their fortune to a crooked business manager. Introduced as the adult son of Johnny (Eugene Levy) and Moira Rose (Catherine O'Hara), David is a former New York City gallerist with little direction and a sheltered worldview. The tight quarters of their new home, the Schitt's Creek Motel, create friction and opportunities for David and his disconnected family as they slowly grow closer. He becomes friends with Stevie Budd (Emily Hampshire), the motel clerk, but generally struggles to connect with others in his new surroundings. David eventually takes a job as a brand manager at a nearby clothing store, Blouse Barn, before opening his own local goods business, Rose Apothecary.

While launching Rose Apothecary, David meets and begins dating his business partner, Patrick Brewer (Noah Reid). Despite having a rich dating history before moving to Schitt's Creek, David's courtship with Patrick quickly becomes his longest relationship ever. Their relationship hits a brief rough patch when Patrick's previously unknown fiancée comes to town, but David and Patrick eventually reconcile. The couple continues to grow personally and professionally before becoming engaged at the end of the show's penultimate season. David and Patrick marry at the Schitt's Creek town hall in the series' final episode.

== Concept and creation ==
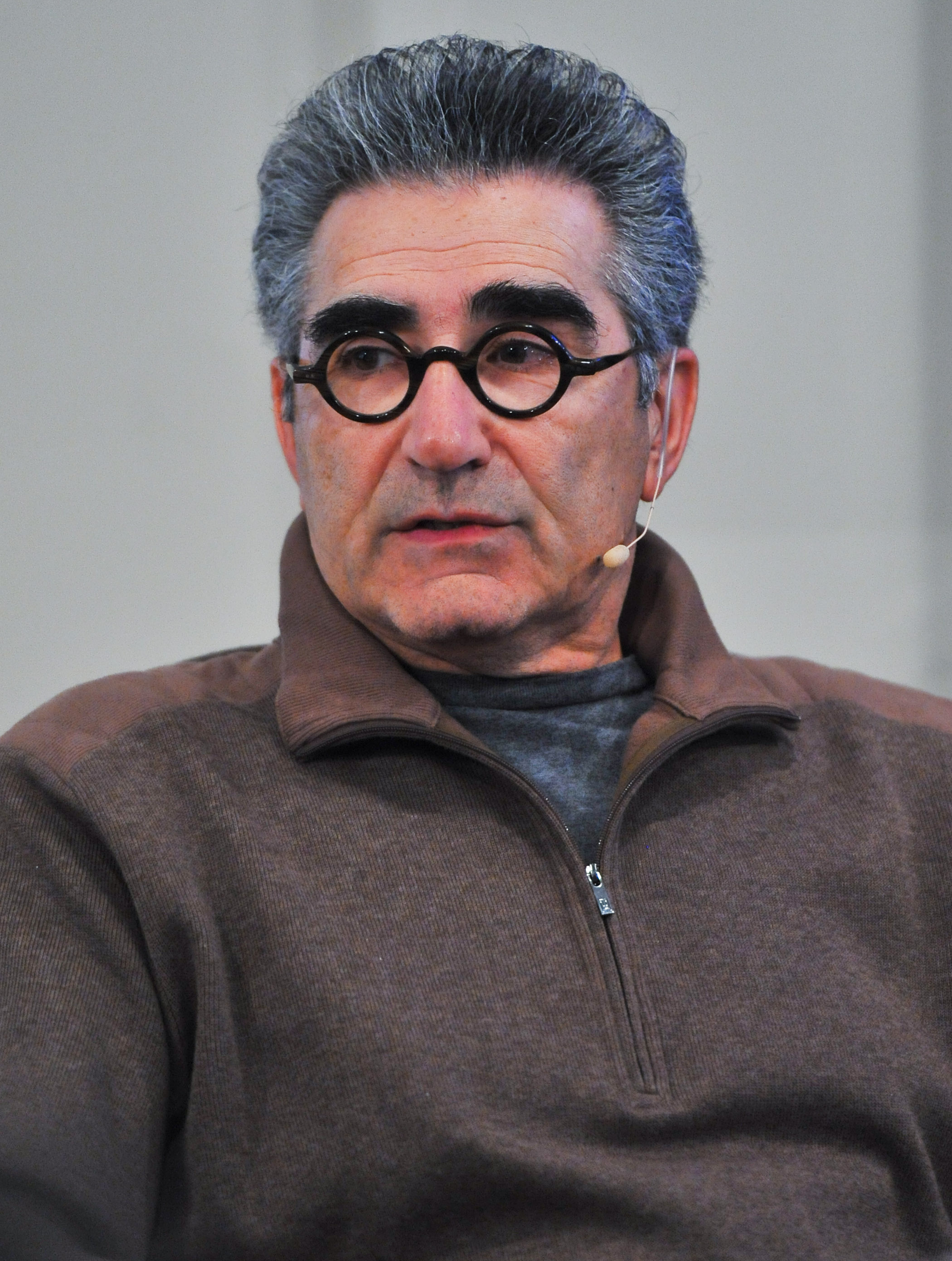
Dan Levy and his father Eugene Levy (pictured in 2012) co-created the character of David Rose.

The character of David Rose was developed by series co-creators Dan and Eugene Levy. Dan originally conceived the show as an exploration of excessive family wealth and the consequences of suddenly losing it all. The idea came after Levy says he felt overwhelmed by the wealth showcased on American reality TV programs like Keeping Up with the Kardashians and The Real Housewives franchise and wondered what would happen if those families could no longer express their affection through "gifts and parties". Interested in pursuing the idea from a character-driven perspective, Dan brought the concept to his father, Eugene, who had experience writing character comedy. The two further developed the idea into what would eventually become Schitt's Creek.

== Characterization ==
David's overall persona was partially crafted during the early stages of filming. Levy initially portrayed the character as speaking in "a hushed whisper", but added more volume on the advice of his father. David's personality was further derived from his designer wardrobe. Speaking to Flare.com, Levy recalled how when he put on the character's clothes, "there was this strange flamboyance that came out for David that was very controlled, and yet not controlled at all". He says this also helped remind him that his character is someone "who has spent his entire life being someone else".

Levy drew additional inspiration for David's character from his own life experiences. In a radio interview with Boston's NPR affiliate, WBUR, Levy related that when crafting David's sexuality and relationships, he "tried writing [from his] experience" as an openly gay man. He has also said that some of David's pop culture reference points, including American singer Mariah Carey, come directly from his personal life. David's fear of moths is also drawn from Levy's own fear of them. Outside of these characteristics, Levy says he and David Rose are quite different.

== Themes ==
=== Personality and personal style ===
David is introduced as insecure, with a "general distaste for other people". In a review for The Hollywood Reporter, Whitney Matheson notes that David "has a stronger bond with his Parisian moisturizer than any human being". David is also highly phobic – fearing bugs, disorganization, germs, nature, and heights. He sometimes downplays or denies these fears in an effort to defy his friends' and family's expectations, but his discomfort is apparent. David further suffers from hypochondriasis. This is revealed early in the series when David is convinced he is having a heart attack, only to discover he is suffering from a panic attack. When downplaying his fears, or otherwise expressing himself, David often displays a dryly sarcastic sense of humour and a lack of social grace. He is particularly blunt when interacting with his sister, Alexis, and best friend, Stevie, although no one is immune to his remarks. In one episode, he tells the owner of the Blouse Barn that the clothes she sells are "skanky". Like his mother, Moira, David is known for his melodramatic behavior, although to a lesser extent.

One of the few assets the Rose family is allowed to retain when they move to Schitt's Creek is their designer clothing. David's wardrobe is rendered almost exclusively in black, white and gray and contains a wide variety of sweaters. He also frequently wears drop crotch pants and designer sneakers. David accessorizes with four identical silver rings, which he wears in a variety of configurations on his right hand. According to Levy, David's aesthetic is inspired by his mother, Moira, as he is "his mother's son". His style is also heavily influenced by designers Rick Owens and Ann Demeulemeester and often includes items from Givenchy, Neil Barrett, and Tisci.

Levy wanted the Rose family's designer pieces to be authentic. This presented a challenge given the show's small wardrobe budget. To overcome the cost barrier, Levy worked in collaboration with costume designer Debra Hanson to source items from consignment stores, eBay, and other online resale markets at reduced prices. Items purchased for the character were dated back to the time the Roses lost their fortune, limiting David's clothing to 2015 or earlier. Levy also sourced pieces from his personal closet, including a pair of Rick Owens lace-ups.

=== Sexuality ===
David is pansexual. This is revealed in season one's "Honeymoon" during a conversation with motel clerk Stevie Budd in which he describes his sexual orientation using a wine analogy. When asked if he drinks red (men) or white (women) wine, David demurs saying that he "like[s] the wine, not the label". A much more direct description of David's sexuality, free of analogies, was offered by Johnny in a later scene in the same episode. The reveal of David's pansexuality is scripted to challenge viewers' assumptions of the character. According to Levy, David's initial relationship with a woman, Stevie, is meant to dispel the notion that the character is gay due to his effeminate nature and push the boundaries of what it means to be traditionally masculine or feminine.

Levy also chose to write the character's sexuality in an environment without homophobia. He has cited several reasons for this creative decision, including his own lack of "patience" for homophobia. Levy also calls this decision a form of "quiet protest" against the LGBTQ tragedy tropes often seen on television, and further stated that David's story is not written to explicitly educate the audience on LGBTQ issues. He says David's sexuality is presented "as it should be" to show the "transformational" impact of love without "the threat of intolerance or bigotry". This approach of acceptance and non-judgement has been widely noted by the press.

== Reception ==
=== Critical reception ===
When Schitt's Creek originally premiered in 2015, Levy and his portrayal of David garnered mostly positive reviews. David Berry of the National Post called the character's "carefully manicured snippiness" a highlight of the first season. People Magazine's Gillian Telling also had early praise, saying that David's facial expressions and one-liners made him possibly one of the show's best characters. Mike Hale of The New York Times was noticeably more negative, calling David "mostly shrill and unlikeable," while also suggesting that Dan Levy had inherited none of his father Eugene's talent. As the series progressed and gained a wider audience with its release on Netflix in 2017 and 2018, the character and his portrayer gained more critical acclaim. Vox’s Caroline Framke noted that while Eugene Levy and Catherine O’Hara are the show's most recognizable selling points, Dan Levy and Annie Murphy were the show's "backbone and beating heart". Richard Lawson stated that David's character arc was "well-rendered" and a "pleasure" to watch in a review for Vanity Fair. Manuel Betancourt of Paste Magazine argued that David's quips are "one of the many reasons Schitt's Creek is one of the most quotable comedies of the moment."

The depiction of David's pansexuality and relationship with Patrick also earned praise from critics. When discussing the overall presentation of sexuality in Schitt's Creek, Them's Michael Cuby stated that the lack of homophobia in David's story was "novel" and "comforting." Christine Linnell of The Advocate also noted that the non-judgmental tone of the show "is creating new ways for queer viewers to see themselves represented and supported". TV Guide's Pilot Viruet further stated the absence of homophobia has resulted in "one of the most caring, hilarious, and jubilant series on television" and allows David to engage in a relationship that is the "absolute highlight of the series". Other critics have echoed similar sentiments, with Devon Ivie of Vulture declaring Patrick and David, "one of the most delightful relationships in recent television history". Matt Brennan of Paste Magazine also argued that their relationship contributed to the overall "sweetening" of Schitt's Creek in season four, culminating with Patrick's serenading of David with "The Best". The New York Times' Margaret Lyons dubbed the moment one of 2018's "most romantic, adorable moments on TV". Stuart Heritage of The Guardian called the scene "one of the most moving things I've ever seen". Kevin Fallon of The Daily Beast described the sequence as, "the kind of honest romantic, pure expression of love that is never shown on TV between two men, not in that grand of a fashion".

David's character has been further noted as important for overall LGBTQ representation on television. In 2017, Mic named his story one of "the 23 most essential storylines for LGBTQ television history" because it showed that femme men are not "limited to homosexual experiences". David was also named to TV Guide's list of "the greatest LGBTQ TV characters of all time" and was called one of "15 unforgettable LGBTQ movie and TV characters" by Redbook in 2019. That same year, Rolling Stone acknowledged David's proclaimed sexuality as part of a shift in the open representation of bisexual and pansexual individuals on TV.

=== Accolades ===
For his work as David Rose, Dan Levy has received four consecutive nominations for Best Performance by an Actor in a Continuing Leading Comedic Role at the 4th, 5th, 6th, and 7th Canadian Screen Awards. He was also nominated for the MTV Movie & TV Award for Best Comedic Performance at the 2018 and 2019 MTV Movie & TV Awards, winning the award in 2019. Levy's work was further recognized with the 2019 GLAAD Davidson/Valenti Award for making a "significant difference in promoting acceptance for the LGBTQ community". He has also won the Primetime Emmy Award for Outstanding Supporting Actor in a Comedy Series in 2020.

As part of the ensemble cast, Levy has won two Canadian Screen Awards for Best Comedy in 2016 and 2019, with an additional nomination in 2017. Levy and the Schitt’s Creek cast were also honored with an ACTRA Award for Member's Choice Series Ensemble in 2019 after having been nominated for the same award in 2017 and 2018. In 2019, Schitt’s Creek also received its first Dorian Award, GLAAD Award, Primetime Emmy Award, and Critics’ Choice nominations – the latter of which was a first for any Canadian comedy. The cast subsequently won two Dorian Awards from these nominations, including the awards for TV Comedy of the Year and Unsung TV Show of the Year.

== Cultural influence ==
Levy says the depiction of David's pansexuality has helped some viewers better understand "queer culture". In interviews, Levy and his father, co-creator Eugene Levy, noted that the letters received from viewers have included: queer individuals feeling more accepted by family members; parents feeling less concerned for their queer children; and others realizing their prior views were homophobic. This response, according to Levy, has become "one of the most meaningful elements of making the show".
