= Neil Barrett (fashion designer) =

English fashion designer

- Label: NEIL BARRETT
- Website: https://www.neilbarrett.com

Neil Barrett is an English fashion designer.

== Movies and Celebrities ==
Neil Barrett's suits have been associated with Gary Barlow, Ben Whishaw, and Matthew Morrison, but international personalities began turning to Neil Barrett for their wardrobe needs since 2004, including Ewan McGregor, Jake Gyllenhaal, and Mark Ruffalo.
