= Johnny Rose =

Fictional character from Schitt's Creek

- Schitt's Creek character
- Eugene Levy as Johnny Rose in the Schitt's Creek episode "Happy Anniversary" (season 2, 2016)
- First appearance: "Our Cup Runneth Over" (2015)
- Last appearance: "Happy Ending" (2020)
- Created by: Dan Levy; Eugene Levy
- Portrayed by: Eugene Levy

In-universe information
- Full name: Jonathan Michael Rose
- Gender: Male
- Occupation: Rosebud Motel Group co-owner (current); Rosebud Motel co-manager (former); CEO of Rose Video (former)
- Spouse: Moira Rose
- Children: David Rose (son); Alexis Rose (daughter)
- Religion: Sephardic Judaism

Jonathan Michael Rose is a fictional character in the Canadian sitcom Schitt's Creek, which aired on the CBC and Pop TV from 2015 to 2020. Johnny is introduced as the patriarch of the central Rose family and stories revolve around his attempts to rebuild his family's fortune and help them adjust to life in Schitt's Creek, a small town he bought as a joke birthday gift for his son, David, in 1991. In later seasons, Johnny's stories focus on his work as co-manager of the Rosebud Motel and his relationship with his family.

The character was portrayed by actor and producer Eugene Levy, who created the series with his son, Dan Levy, for the series entire 80-episode run. His performance as Johnny has been widely praised, earning him four consecutive Canadian Screen Award nominations and one win in 2016 for Best Performance by an Actor in a Continuing Leading Comedic Role. In 2019, Levy received his first Primetime Emmy nomination for the role for Outstanding Lead Actor in a Comedy Series. He was also nominated in 2020, this time winning the award.

== Concept and creation ==
The character of Johnny Rose was created by Eugene Levy and his son, Schitt's Creek co-creator Dan Levy. While crafting Johnny and the rest of the Rose family, the Levys drew inspiration from wealthy American reality TV families portrayed on such shows as Keeping Up with the Kardashians and The Real Housewives franchise. Early incarnations of the character depicted Johnny as an incompetent man who ran a business with his two brothers. But as they further developed the series, the Levys believed the character needed more "credibility" as a businessman and a certain set of "executive skills" which would allow him to handle the financial crisis that befalls the Rose family. Intending for Johnny to be the "straight man" of the series, the elder Levy also drew more inspiration for the role from his own personality than he had for any of his previous characters. Catherine O'Hara helped further develop the character by setting the tone and overall dynamic for Johnny's relationship with his wife, Moira, after she secured the role.

== Design ==
In contrast to his wife, Moira's, often over-the-top black and white wardrobe, Johnny's sense of style is more subdued. He is frequently clad in a "well-tailored" gray or black suit from designers like Hugo Boss and Ermenegildo Zegna. This serves as a reminder to the audience of Johnny's business background, as well as the wealth from which he came.

== Characterization ==
Johnny presents himself as the most "dependable," realistic, and "easy-going" member of the Rose family. He approaches the family's current predicament with a business-like mentality and often provides logical advice to alleviate their various woes. His loyalty and affirming devotion also anchors the family, as things frequently threaten to spin out of control. Despite this, however, Johnny still "loses it himself all the time." Whether it's his incredulous reaction to Alexis (Annie Murphy) over-ordering his shipment of raw milk, or his exasperation at David (Dan Levy) misunderstanding what constitutes a tax write-off, Johnny maintains an underlying sense of "panic" over his family's lack of basic skills.

Johnny is also frequently flummoxed by technology and new business techniques. These struggles include basic computer skills, such as navigating the Internet, and the use of social media to help grow one's business. He frequently falls back on his experience running Rose Video to help him navigate business dealings, even if those approaches are not the most up-to-date. While religion appears incidental to his characterisation, in the episode Housewarming (S05E03), after Johnny changes the diaper of baby Roland Moira Schitt, Moira refers to her husband as "the Sephardic Mr Clean". However, the assumption is that Johnny is non-observant given his insistence on ordering pork at Café Tropical (S01E11: Little Sister). Johnny also serves up pork chops at a family lunch after David and Patrick refuse a discounted rate to hold their wedding at Elmbridge Manor due to the noise of pig slaughtering at the local farm (S06E01: Smoke Signals).

== Fictional biography ==
Schitt's Creek follows the lives of the once-wealthy Rose family, who must relocate to the titular town after losing their fortune to a corrupt business manager. Introduced as the former CEO of Rose Video—a video rental chain—and head of the family, Johnny is an "entitled," yet competent businessman determined to return the Roses to their former social standing. He initially helps and encourages his family to adjust to life in their new surroundings, but struggles to find his own place in the town. After a few misguided business ventures, he partners with motel clerk Stevie Budd (Emily Hampshire) to co-manage his new home, the Rosebud Motel.

During his time in Schitt's Creek, Johnny's entitlement recedes, and his appreciation for his family and the local townspeople grows. He remains steadfast to his wife, Moira (Catherine O'Hara), throughout the series and becomes an enthusiastic supporter of the personal and professional successes of his adult children, David (Dan Levy) and Alexis (Annie Murphy). Johnny also grows closer to Stevie and town mayor, Roland Schitt (Chris Elliott), who, by the end of season five, have worked together to make the Rosebud Motel a successful business.

== Reception ==
=== Critical reception ===
When Schitt's Creek premiered in 2015, many critics celebrated the return of Levy-O'Hara as a comedic duo. In an early review for The Hollywood Reporter, Whitney Matheson said much the show's "charm" is derived from seeing Levy and O'Hara portray "extreme, unsympathetic characters," further arguing that only the seasoned professionals "could pull off the levels of deadpan required to convince us that, say, the parents can't remember their own daughter's middle name." Brian Moylan of The Guardian called the series a nice "recipe for these two comedy vets to stretch their chops." Moze Halperin of Flavorwire had a decidedly different reaction, calling Levy and O'Hara's performances "vacated" and "more actorly than comedic." As the series progressed, critics reacted with far more praise. Vulture's Maggie Fremont declared Levy and O'Hara's characters the emotional "anchor" of the show, and Caroline Framke of Variety called the actor pairing a "reliable goldmine."

Critics also noted how Johnny Rose is a departure from most of Levy's previous roles. People Magazine's Gillian Telling said that rather than a "bumbling oaf or super-nerd," Johnny Rose was "stronger" and "more confident." Richard Lawson of Vanity Fair also called the role "against type" and Levy's portrayal smart and "surprisingly dashing." The Guardian's Brian Moylan further appreciated the turn, saying the role let the actor be in "much finer form" than some of his previous roles. And Julie Miller, in a retrospective article on the character for Vanity Fair, declared Levy as Johnny Rose "may be the most brilliant of the actor’s nearly 50-year career—a masterclass in his deadpan gift."

=== Accolades ===
For his work as Johnny Rose, Levy has been nominated for four consecutive Canadian Screen Awards for Best Performance by an Actor in a Continuing Leading Comedic Role, beginning in 2016. He subsequently won the award in 2016, beating out his on and off-screen son, Dan Levy. As part of the ensemble cast, the elder Levy also won two Canadian Screen Awards for Best Comedy in 2016 and 2019, with an additional nomination in 2017. In 2019, Levy received a Primetime Emmy nomination for Lead Actor in a Comedy Series.

In 2019, Levy and the Schitt's Creek cast were also honored with the ACTRA Award for Member's Choice Series Ensemble, an award for which they were also nominated in 2017 and 2018. The ensemble scored additional wins for TV Comedy of the Year and Unsung TV Show of the Year as part of the 2019 Dorian Awards. Other 2019 cast nominations included a GLAAD Award for Outstanding Comedy Series; a Critics Choice Award for Best Comedy Series; and a Television Critics Association Award for Outstanding Achievement in Comedy.
