= Caroline Framke =

American writer and critic

- Born: September 30, 1988 (age 38)
- Education: Smith College
- Occupations: Writer, TV and film critic

Caroline Framke (born September 30, 1988) is an American writer and critic and is Chief TV Critic at Variety. Formerly, she was a columnist at Vox and has contributed to The Atlantic, The A.V. Club, Flavorwire, Complex, Vulture, Salon, and NPR.

Her gender and culture commentary have been featured in books. She has studied and written about the #MeToo movement, and her analysis was featured in The New York Times' Editor's Reading List of 2017. Framke was the head of a widely covered study that found that in the 2015–2016 television season, 10% of character deaths were of LGBT women, even though they made up an extremely small percentage of total characters.
