= Tim Rozon =

Canadian actor (born 1976)

- Rozon at Dragon Con in 2026
- Born: June 4, 1976 (age 50); Montreal, Quebec, Canada
- Occupation: Actor
- Years active: 2000–present
- Spouse: Linzey Rozon (2015-present)
- Children: 1

Timothy James Rozon (born June 4, 1976) is a Canadian actor. He is known for his roles as Tommy Quincy on the CTV teen drama Instant Star, Mutt Schitt in the CBC comedy Schitt's Creek, Doc Holliday on the supernatural/western drama series Wynonna Earp, Luke Roman in Surreal Estate, a real-estate drama with a supernatural theme and most recently as O'Shea, a sinister karate sensei and loan shark in a martial arts drama film Karate Kid: Legends.

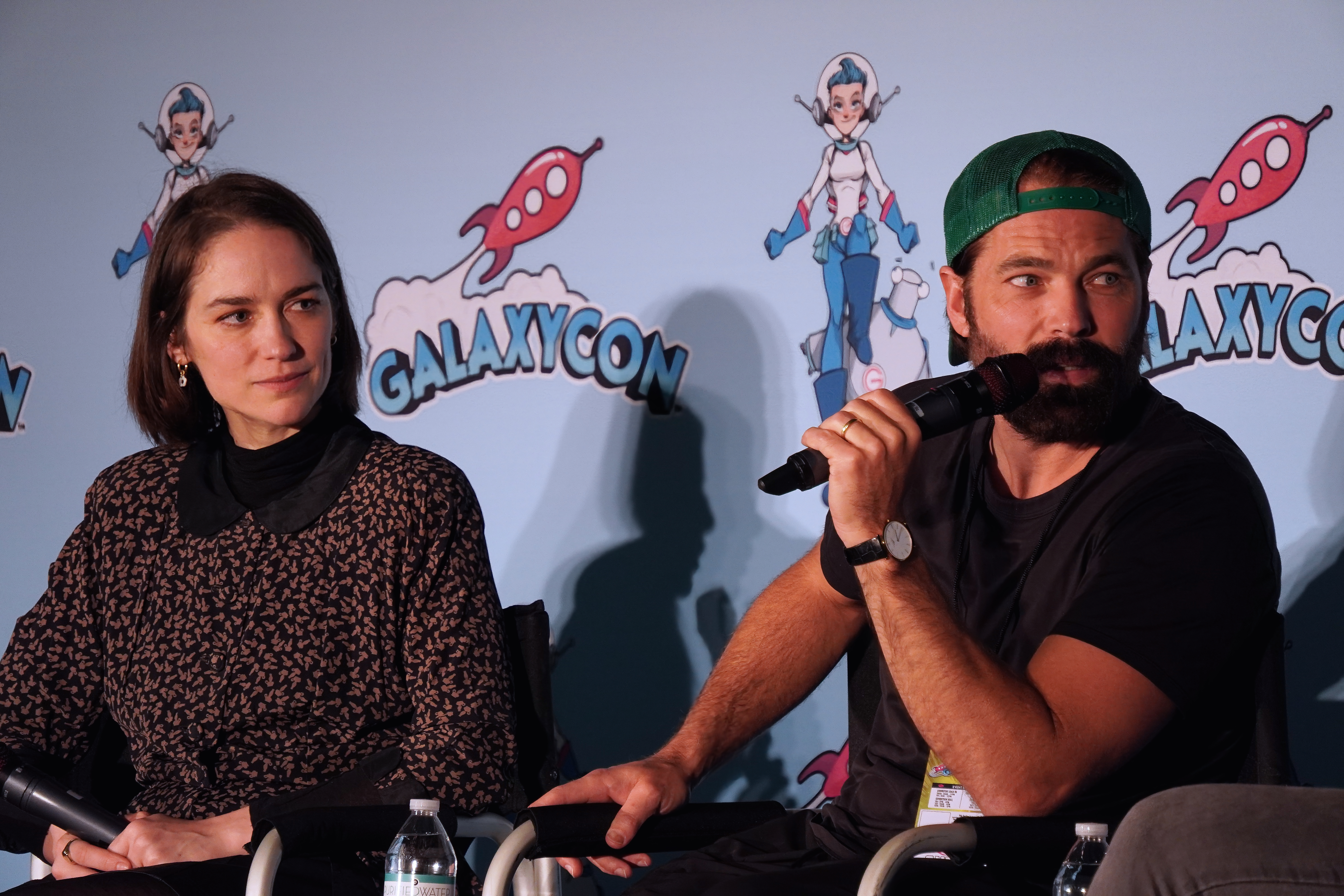
Melanie Scrofano and Tim Rozon at GalaxyCon Richmond in 2023

== Career ==
Rozon's first role was supporting Mira Sorvino in the 2000 A&E film The Great Gatsby. His big break came in 2004 when he landed the role of Tom "Tommy Q" Quincy in the CTV/TeenNick teen drama Instant Star, a role he played for four seasons. In 2018, he and the cast of Wynonna Earp received the People's Choice Award for Best Sci-Fi Show.

In 2022 he won the Canadian Screen Award for Best Supporting Actor in a Drama Program or Series at the 10th Canadian Screen Awards for Wynonna Earp.

== Personal life ==
Rozon resides in Montreal where he co-owns the restaurant Garde Manger with Canadian celebrity chef Chuck Hughes. He has been married to equestrian Linzey Govan Rozon since 2015; they have a son born in 2020.

== Filmography ==
| Year | Film | Role | Notes |
|---|---|---|---|
| 2004 | Pure | Sam | |
| 2006 | Duo | Lewis | |
| 2007 | End of the Line | John | |
| 2007 | 2 Strangers and a Foosball | "Duke" | Direct-to-video film |
| 2008 | Production Office | "Double D" | |
| 2008 | Fire and Fury | Claude | Short film |
| 2009 | Long Gone Day | Christian Locke | |
| 2009 | Screamers: The Hunting | Madden | |
| 2010 | Territories | Gabriel | |
| 2010 | St. Roz | Neil | |
| 2013 | The Legend of Sarila | Putulik | Voice role |
| 2025 | Karate Kid: Legends | O'Shea | |

| Year | Television | Role | Notes |
|---|---|---|---|
| 2000 | The Great Gatsby | Dandy Man | Television film |
| 2003 | See Jane Date | The Waiter | Television film |
| 2004 | Crimes of Fashion | Marcus | Television film; also known as Boss Girl |
| 2004 | Naked Josh | Charles | Episode: "Game, Set-up, Match" |
| 2004 | I Do (But I Don't) | Rick Corina | Television film |
| 2004 | 15/Love | Jimmy Kane | Episode: "Seedy Reputation" |
| 2004 | Fries With That | John Smith | Episodes: "Undercover Guy" |
| 2004–2008 | Instant Star | Tommy Quincy | Main role; 52 episodes |
| 2008 | Would Be Kings | Tom | Mini-series |
| 2009 | Wild Roses | Briggs | Recurring role; 5 episodes |
| 2009 | The Listener | Peter Garvin | Episode: "My Sister's Keeper" |
| 2010 | Rookie Blue | Gabe Lessing | Episode: "Takedown" |
| 2011 | Flashpoint | Alex Carson | Episode: "I'd Do Anything" |
| 2011 | Befriend and Betray | Alex Caine | Television film |
| 2011 | Against The Wall | Shane | Episode: "A Good Cop" |
| 2011 | 18 to Life | Male Model | Episode: "15 Minutes of Shame" |
| 2013 | Lost Girl | Massimo "The Druid" | Recurring role; 5 episodes |
| 2013 | A Sister's Revenge | Michael Miller | Television film |
| 2013 | Heartland | Eric Williams | Episode: "Breaking Point" |
| 2014 | Being Human | Andrew | Recurring role; 5 episodes |
| 2014 | 19-2 | Richard | 2 episodes: "Winter" & "Medals" |
| 2015 | Vox | Matt | Television film |
| 2015 | Unearthing | Healy James | Television film |
| 2015–2018 | Schitt's Creek | Mutt Schitt | Main role; 23 episodes |
| 2016–2021 | Wynonna Earp | Doc Holliday | Main role |
| 2016 | Crossfire | Graydon | Television film |
| 2017 | Saving Hope | Spencer Walsh | Episode: "Birthday Blues" |
| 2018 | Lake Placid: Legacy | Sam | Television film |
| 2018 | Beginner's Luck | Terry | In post-production |
| 2019 | Christmas Town | Travis | Television film |
| 2020 | Vagrant Queen | Isaac Stelling | Main role, 10 episodes |
| 2021–2025 | SurrealEstate | Luke Roman | Lead role |
| 2022 | Merry Swissmas | Liam | Television film |
| 2025 | We Were Liars | Salty Dan | Recurring role, 3 episodes |
| 2026 | Bon Cop, Bad Cop | Steven Masters | Recurring role |
