= Sarah Levy (actress) =

Canadian actress (born 1986)

- Born: September 10, 1986 (age 40); Toronto, Ontario, Canada
- Occupation: Actress
- Years active: 2005, 2011–present
- Notable work: Schitt's Creek
- Spouse: Graham Outerbridge (m. 2021)
- Children: 1
- Father: Eugene Levy
- Relatives: Dan Levy (brother)

Sarah Levy (born September 10, 1986) is a Canadian actress best known for her role of Twyla Sands in Schitt's Creek.

== Early life ==
Levy is the daughter of actor Eugene Levy and Deborah Divine. Her brother is actor Dan Levy. She graduated from Branksome Hall and studied theatre at Dalhousie University. Her father is Jewish and her mother is Protestant.

== Career ==
One of Levy's earliest film roles was in Larry Crowne. She also had a minor part in Adam Shankman's Cheaper by the Dozen 2, in which her father appeared.

Her most notable role was Twyla Sands on Schitt's Creek, where she co-starred with her father and brother as a waitress at the local café. According to her brother, working together brought the family closer. In 2020, it was reported that Levy had joined the cast of Distancing Socially, which was filmed at the height of the COVID-19 pandemic in 2020, using remote technologies and the iPhone 11. It was acquired and released by Cinedigm in October 2021.

== Personal life ==
Levy married actor Graham Outerbridge in October 2021. They have a son, James Eugene Outerbridge born in July 2022.

== Filmography ==
Year	Title	Roles	Notes
2005	Cheaper by the Dozen 2	—N/a	assistant to Eugene Levy
2011	XIII: The Series	Librarian	"Green Falls"
2011	Larry Crowne	Eli	
2012	The Applicant	Lola	Short Film
2013	Roomies	Bridget	Short Film
2014	Working the Engels	Irene Horowitz	"Meet Irene Horowitz"
2015–2020	Schitt's Creek	Twyla Sands	series regular (62 episodes); Screen Actors Guild Award for Outstanding Performance by an Ensemble in a Comedy Series (2020); Nominated — Canadian Screen Award for Best Supporting Actress, Comedy (2020); Nominated — IGN Summer Movie Award for Best TV Ensemble (2020)
2016	Baroness Von Sketch Show	Janice	"Last Year You Weren't 40"
2019	The Winner Mindset	Lisa G.	Short Film
2019	Best Intentions	Becky Fistick	TV movie
2020	Dear Class of 2020	Twyla Sands	Direct-to-Video
2020	United We Fall	Kendra	"The Biter"
2021	All Rise	Debbie Daines	"Georgia"
2021	Distancing Socially	Chloe	
2021–2025	SurrealEstate	Susan Ireland	Main role
2023	The Holiday Shift	Susan	
2025	The Monkey	Ida Zimmer	
2026	Grey's Anatomy	Corrie	Guest star
TBA	Patty's Auto	Jenna	"Pilot" (announced)
