= Richard Lawson (writer) =

American journalist (born 1983)

- Born: May 31, 1983 (age 43); Boston, Massachusetts, U.S.
- Education: Boston College
- Occupations: Critic; blogger; novelist
- Writing career
- Period: 2007–present
- Genre: Young adult
- Subjects: Film; popular culture

Richard Lawson (born May 31, 1983) is an American journalist and critic. He rose to prominence as an entertainment writer for Gawker and was chief critic for Vanity Fair from 2018 to 2025. Lawson's debut YA novel, All We Can Do Is Wait, was released in February 2018.

== Career ==
Lawson began his writing career at Gawker in 2007. Initially hired onto Gawker's ad sales team, Lawson secretly began participating in Gawker's active comments section under the handle LolCait, where his writing gained the attention of the editorial staff. After revealing his identity, he began providing editorial content for the site, first by selecting the week's best comments, and eventually becoming a full-time editor. Lawson gained notice for his television recaps for shows such as The Real Housewives of New York City. His posts were the most popular on the site, where they garnered 2.4 million viewers each month. He left in July 2009 to work at TV.com for five months, before returning to Gawker. Lawson left the site for the second time in late 2011 to work for The Atlantic Wire as a senior entertainment and culture writer.

In November 2013, Lawson left The Atlantic Wire to work as the Hollywood columnist at Vanity Fair. Four months later, he was hired as the magazine's TV and film critic. In March 2018, he became Vanity Fair's chief critic. In August 2025, he was laid off from the magazine.

Lawson's debut novel, All We Can Do Is Wait, was released on February 6, 2018, under Razorbill. The book is a YA novel that centers on a group of teenagers in the waiting room of a hospital after a bridge collapse. All We Can Do Is Wait received a starred review from Publishers Weekly.

== Preferences ==
=== Favorites ===
In 2019, Lawson named the following films as the ten best of the 2010s:

1. Mad Max: Fury Road (USA, 2015)
2. Phantom Thread (USA, 2017)
3. Dawson City: Frozen Time (USA, 2016)
4. Melancholia (Denmark, 2011)
5. Parasite (South Korea, 2019)
6. Get Out (USA, 2017)
7. Eden (France, 2014)
8. Force Majeure (Sweden, 2014)
9. Weekend (UK, 2011)
10. Princess Cyd (USA, 2017)

=== Best of the Year ===
Since becoming a film critic for Vanity Fair, Lawson has marked these films as the best of the year.

- 2013: Nebraska
- 2014: Love is Strange
- 2015: Mad Max: Fury Road
- 2016: The Meddler
- 2017: BPM (Beats per Minute)
- 2018: Roma
- 2019: Parasite
- 2020: The Nest
- 2021: The Worst Person in the World
- 2022: Tár
- 2023: May December
- 2024: I Saw the TV Glow

== Personal life ==
Lawson was raised in the Brighton neighborhood of Boston, and attended Boston Latin School and Boston College, before moving to New York City.

Lawson wrote an article that went viral about the personal significance of openly gay Olympic figure skater Adam Rippon during the 2018 Winter Olympics.
