= Rizwan Manji =

Canadian actor

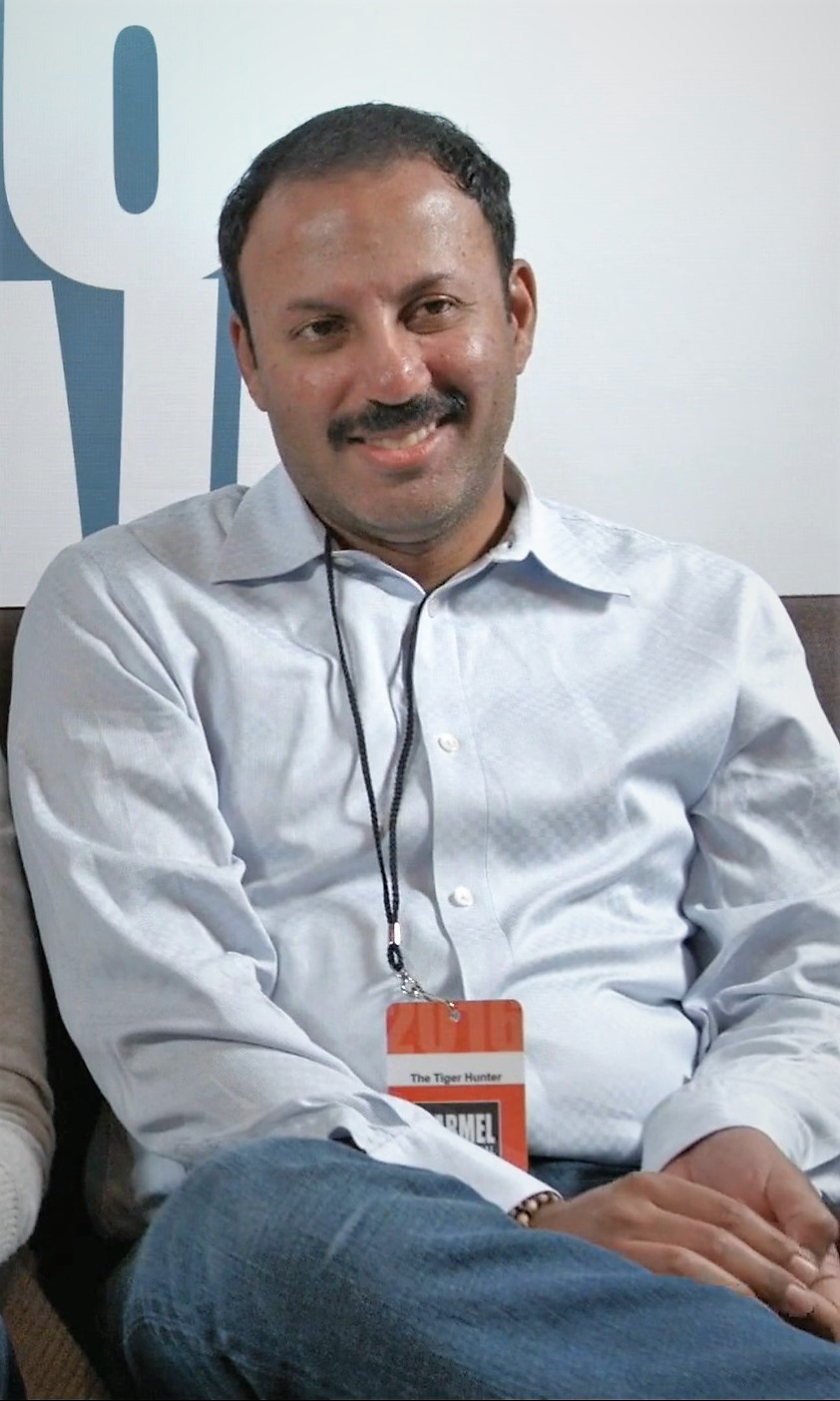
- Manji at the Carmel Film Festival in 2016
- Born: October 17, 1974 (age 51); Toronto, Ontario, Canada
- Education: American Musical and Dramatic Academy
- Occupation: Actor
- Years active: 1997–present
- Spouse: Taslim Manji
- Children: 3

Rizwan Manji (born October 17, 1974) is a Canadian actor. He portrayed Ray Butani on Schitt's Creek, Tick Pickwick on The Magicians, Rajiv Gidwani in the NBC sitcom Outsourced, and Jamil in the DC Extended Universe (DCEU) television series Peacemaker (2022–present).

== Early life ==
Manji was born in Toronto, Ontario, to Indian parents who emigrated from Tanzania. His family is Ismaili-Muslim of Gujarati Indian descent, and he has said that his religion is very important to him. When Manji was in grade one, he and his family moved to Calgary, Alberta, where he was raised. He graduated from Crescent Heights High School.

Manji's parents wanted him to go to university to earn a degree, but he wanted to be an actor. He attended the University of Alberta, where his sister Rishma was enrolled. The only class he enjoyed there was drama. In 1992, Manji enrolled at the American Musical and Dramatic Academy in New York City.

== Career ==
During the early years of Manji's career, he played small parts in various films and television shows, with recurring roles in Privileged, Better Off Ted and 24.

From 2010 to 2011, Manji played Rajiv Gidwani on the NBC comedy Outsourced. He initially auditioned for the role of Gupta; Parvesh Cheena got the part, but the producers cast Manji as the scheming assistant manager Rajiv.

Manji played Ray Butani on the CBC comedy Schitt's Creek from 2015 to 2020, for which he was nominated for a Canadian Screen Award.

He also appeared in seasons 2–5 of The Magicians, a fantasy television series on SyFy.

In 2019, he starred in the NBC comedy Perfect Harmony as Reverend Jax, a missionary who runs a church. The show, which starred Bradley Whitford, was cancelled after one season.

Manji has also appeared in a GEICO commercial as a customer in the checkout aisle who wins the "auction," and in commercials for Kmart, LendingTree, National Car Rental, The UPS Store, and Beyond Meat.

Manji co-hosts a podcast titled The Brighter Side of News.

== Personal life ==
Manji lives in Studio City, California, with his wife and three children. He has spoken openly about issues facing South Asian and Muslim actors in Hollywood.

== Filmography ==
=== Film ===
Year	Title	Role	Notes
1997	Sue Lost in Manhattan	Newsstand Owner	
1998	Too Tired to Die	Young Arab	
2001	American Desi	Salim Ali Khan	
2001	Queenie in Love	Ahmed	
2002	The Guru	Party Waiter	
2004	Fillum Star: The Peter Patel Story	Peter Patel	
2007	Transformers	Akram	
2007	Charlie Wilson's War	Colonel Mahmood	
2007	God, Inc.	Muslim Publicist	Short film
2009	Karma Calling	Nikhil Shah	
2010	Morning Glory	DayBreak Producer	
2012	The Dictator	HIV Patient	
2012	The Citizen	Mo	
2013	The Wolf of Wall Street	Kalil	
2013	Don Jon	Teacher	
2013	Decoding Annie Parker	Assistant	
2014	Dr. Cabbie	Vijay	
2014	That Thing with the Cat	Manu	
2014	Alexander and the Terrible, Horrible, No Good, Very Bad Day	Mr. Cellars	
2015	Equals	Gilead	
2015	Miss India America	Balu Patel	
2016	Paterson	Donny	
2016	The Tiger Hunter	Babu Rahman	
2016	Odd Squad: The Movie	Weird Mitch	
2016	The Bounce Back	Daryl	
2016	Arranged	Raj	Short
2017	Wild Honey	Writers' Group Leader	
2018	The Man Who Killed Hitler and Then the Bigfoot	Maple Leaf	
2020	Eat Wheaties!	Bruce Rapp	
2020	Midnight Curry	Aman Khoja	
2022	Wedding Season	Vijay, Asha's father	
2023	The Donor Party	Kahlil	
2023	Shazam! Fury of the Gods	Docent	
2023	Mustache	Hameed	
2023	Journey to Bethlehem	Caspar	
2025	For Worse	Mark	
2025	Re-Election	Governor Manish Singh	
2026	Kissing Is the Easy Part	College Advisor	
TBA	Astrological	Aman	Post-production

=== Television ===
Year	Title	Role	Notes
1998	Money Kings	Club Patron	Television film
1999	One Life to Live	Dr. Patel	Episode: #1.7991
2005	Law & Order: Criminal Intent	Santanu Singh	Episode: "Gone"
2005	NCIS	Dr. Pandy	Episode: "SWAK"
2005	Damage Control		2 episodes
2005	Sleeper Cell	Car Salesman	Episode: "Money"
2005	Late Night with Conan O'Brien	Santa Claus	Episode: "#13.62"
2006	E-Ring	Officer ISI	Episode: "Five Pillars"
2006	Rescue Me	Haji	Episode: "Retards"
2007	The Knights of Prosperity	Dentist	Episode: "Operation: Fighting Shape"
2007	The Game	Tubak	Episode: "To Baby... Or Not to Baby"
2007	Without a Trace	Fasil Mazarin	Episode: "Deep Water"
2008–2009	Privileged	Rami	10 episodes
2008	Mind of Mencia	Gynecologist	Episode: "#4.1"
2008	Life	Young Doctor	Episode: "Everything... All the Time"
2008	It's Always Sunny in Philadelphia	Mehar	Episode: "Paddy's Pub: The Worst Bar in Philadelphia"
2008	Hannah Montana	Ajay	Episode: "You Never Give Me My Money"
2009–2010	Better Off Ted	Rick / Male Office Worker	5 episodes
2009–2010	FlashForward	Maneesh Sandhar	3 episodes
2009	The Suite Life on Deck	Swami Banu Kapatu	Episode: "The Mommy and the Swami"
2009	Worst Week	Ashok	Episode: "The Epidural"
2009	Eleventh Hour	Tony	Episode: "Olfactus"
2009	How I Met Your Mother	Dr. Vikash	Episode: "Double Date"
2009	Medium	Rental Agent	Episode: "New Terrain"
2009	Three Rivers	Dr. Drev / Dr. Dev / Male Doctor	3 episodes
2010–2011	Outsourced	Rajiv Gidwani	22 episodes
2010	24	Ahman	3 episodes
2010	Glee	Dr. Gidwani	Episode: "Laryngitis"
2010	Hawthorne	Dr. Asheesh Danee	Episode: "Afterglow"
2011	Rizzoli & Isles	Private Investigator	Episode: "Seventeen Ain't So Sweet"
2012–2013	Crash & Bernstein	Dr. Gordon	2 episodes
2012	New Girl	Interviewer	Episode: "Normal"
2012	Shake It Up	John	Episode: "Whodunit Up?"
2012	Squad 85	Cubby / Asst. Principal	3 episodes
2013	Touch	Pakistani Interrogator	Episode: "Enemy of My Enemy"
2013	Wendell & Vinnie	Aziz	2 episodes
2013	Arrested Development	Animesh / Male Concierge	Episode: "Indian Takers"
2013	Save Me	Dr. Carroll	Episode: "Heal Thee"
2013	Anger Management	Indian Father	Episode: "Charlie and the Airport Sext"
2013	Lucky 7	Ahsan Lashiri	3 episodes
2013	Bones	Raymond McCants	Episode: "The Mystery in the Meat"
2013	The Goldbergs	Donald	Episode: "Shopping"
2013–2014	Dog with a Blog	Dr. Young	2 episodes
2014	Mom	Dr. Bellin	2 episodes
2014	Working the Engels	Edward Fancy-Doodle	Episode: "Jenna vs. Big Pastry Part II"
2014	Mixology	Ganesh	Episode: "Closing Time"
2015	Young & Hungry	Cashier / Doctor	Episode: "Young & Munchies"
2015	Backstrom	Dr. Deb Chaman	5 episodes
2015	The Thundermans	Babu Ouch	Episode: "Phoebe vs Max: The Sequel"
2015	Minority Report	Dr. Orson	Episode: "Fredi"
2015–2020	Schitt's Creek	Ray Butani	13 episodes
2015–2016	Bella and the Bulldogs	Mr. Matoo	2 episodes
2016	The League	Maitre D	Episode: "The 13 Stages of Grief"
2016	NCIS: Los Angeles	Anton	Episode: "Matryoshka, Part 1"
2016	Workaholics	Saul Kingston	Episode: "Night at the Dudeseum"
2016	Another Period	Prince Apato	Episode: "The Prince and the Pauper"
2016	Goliath	Dr. Carbo	Episode: "It's Donald"
2017–2020	The Magicians	Tick Pickwick	24 episodes
2017	Mr. Robot	Norm	Recurring role
2017	Mondays	Tour Guide	2 episodes
2018	Rob Riggle’s Ski Master Academy	Todd	8 episodes
2018	A Very Nutty Christmas	Justin	TV movie
2019–2021	Sydney to the Max	Vice Principal Virman	7 episodes
2019–2020	Perfect Harmony	Reverend Jax	Main cast, 13 episodes
2020–2021	Mira, Royal Detective	Mr. Khan / Ajhay Sharma (voice)	8 episodes
2020–2021	American Dad!	Knight / Towel Swan (voice)	2 episodes
2021	Atypical	Vice Principal Patrick	3 episodes
2022	Peacemaker	Jamil	Recurring role
2022	Roar	Third Husband (Raoul)	Episode: "The Woman Who Returned Her Husband"
2022	Zarqa	Yusuf	3 episodes
2022	Family Guy	Giraffe (voice)	Episode: "Happy Holo-ween"
2022	Beauty and the Beast: A 30th Celebration	Le Fou	Live TV special

=== Video games ===
Year	Title	Role
2007	Age of Empires III: The Asian Dynasties	Akbar
