= Karen Robinson =

Canadian actress (born 1968)

- Born: February 29, 1968 (age 58); London, England, UK
- Occupation: Actress
- Years active: 1994–present

Karen Robinson (born February 29, 1968) is a Canadian actress. She won the Canadian Screen Award for Best Performance in a Guest Role in a Drama Series at the 7th Canadian Screen Awards in 2019 for her appearance on the television series Mary Kills People. She also won a 2021 Screen Actors Guild Award as part of the Schitt's Creek cast.

== Early life ==
Born in England, raised in Jamaica, Robinson moved to Drumheller, Alberta with her family as a teenager. She was active in the arts in childhood, including singing in choirs, acting in school plays and reciting at poetry readings, and studied communication and theatre at Mount Royal College in Calgary before beginning to work as a professional actress in the early 1990s.

== Theatrical work ==
On stage, she originated the role of Marie-Joseph Angélique in Lorena Gale's play Angélique in 1998, for which she received a Betty Mitchell Award nomination for Best Actress in 1998. In 2003, she originated the role of Lily in the Stratford Festival production of Timothy Findley's play Shadows; the following year, she played Clytemnestra in three concurrent plays, Aeschylus's Agamemnon, Jean Giraudoux's Electra and Jean-Paul Sartre's The Flies. In 2006, she received a Dora Mavor Moore Award nomination for Outstanding Performance by a Female in a Principal Role in a Play (Large Theatre) for her performance in Trevor Rhone's Two Can Play.

In 2009, she played Prospera in a gender-flipped Dream in High Park production of William Shakespeare's The Tempest, and won the Elizabeth Sterling Haynes Award for Best Supporting Actress in a Play for her performance as Mrs. Muller in the Citadel Theatre production of John Patrick Shanley's Doubt.

She has also appeared in productions of M. NourbeSe Philip's Coups and Calypsos, George F. Walker's Problem Child, Shakespeare's A Midsummer Night's Dream, Djanet Sears's Harlem Duet, Beth Graham's The Gravitational Pull of Bernice Trimble and Oscar Wilde's The Importance of Being Earnest.

== Film and television ==
Her film appearances have included Against the Ropes, Love, Sex and Eating the Bones, Who Killed Atlanta's Children?, Owning Mahowny, Short Hymn, Silent War, Lars and the Real Girl, Final Jeopardy and Defund. My Louisiana Sky(2001)

On television, she has had regular roles as Carlos's mother in The Line, Ingrid Evans in King, Hani Suleman in Shoot the Messenger, Mildred Clarke in Frankie Drake Mysteries and Ronnie Lee in Schitt's Creek. She appeared in season 1, episode 2 of The Handmaid's Tale as June's nurse. She also has a recurring role as Cassandra Shaw in the Hallmark Movie & Mystery Channel's series Morning Show Mysteries based on the books by Al Roker. She received a Gemini Award nomination for Best Supporting Actress in a Television Film or Miniseries at the 26th Gemini Awards in 2011 for her performance as Cherlene in The Gospel According to the Blues. In 2020, she appeared on Star Trek: Discovery as well as Tiny Pretty Things, and in the drama series Pretty Hard Cases. She also has a recurring role in season 3 of A Million Little Things. In 2021 she had a recurring role as Margarita Vee in the Titans TV series on HBOmax.

Since 2024 she appears as police inspector Vivienne Holness in Law & Order Toronto: Criminal Intent.

== Awards and nominations ==
Year	Award	Category	Work	Result	Ref
1996	Dora Mavor Moore Award	Outstanding Performance by a Female in a Play (Mid Size Theater)	Riot	Won	
1998	Betty Mitchell Award	Best Actress	Angélique	Nominated	
2006	Dora Mavor Moore Award	Outstanding Performance by a Female in a Principal Role in a Play (Large Theater)	Two Can Play	Nominated	
2007	NAACP Theater Awards	Best Ensemble Award	Da KINK in My Hair	Won	
2009	Elizabeth Sterling Haynes Award	Best Supporting Actress in a Play	Doubt	Won	
2009	Dora Mavor Moore Award	Outstanding Performance by a Female	Eternal Hydra	Nominated	
2011	Gemini Awards	Best Performance by an Actress in a Featured Supporting Role in a Dramatic Program or Mini-Series	The Gospel According to the Blues	Nominated	
2012	Salento International Film Festival	Best Actress	Ghett'A Life	Won	
2013	Betty Mitchell Award	Outstanding Performance by an Actress in a Drama	Intimate Apparel	Nominated	
2013/2014	Dora Mavor Moore Award	Outstanding Performance - Ensemble	Minotaur	Nominated	
2019	Canadian Screen Awards	Best Guest Performance, Drama Series	Mary Kills People	Won	
2019	Screen Actors Guild Award	Outstanding Performance by an Ensemble in a Comedy Series	Schitt's Creek	Nominated	
2020	ACTRA Award	Outstanding Performance - Female	Forgive Me	Nominated	
2020	Screen Actors Guild Award	Outstanding Performance by an Ensemble in a Comedy Series	Schitt's Creek	Won	
