= Djouliet Amara =

Canadian actress

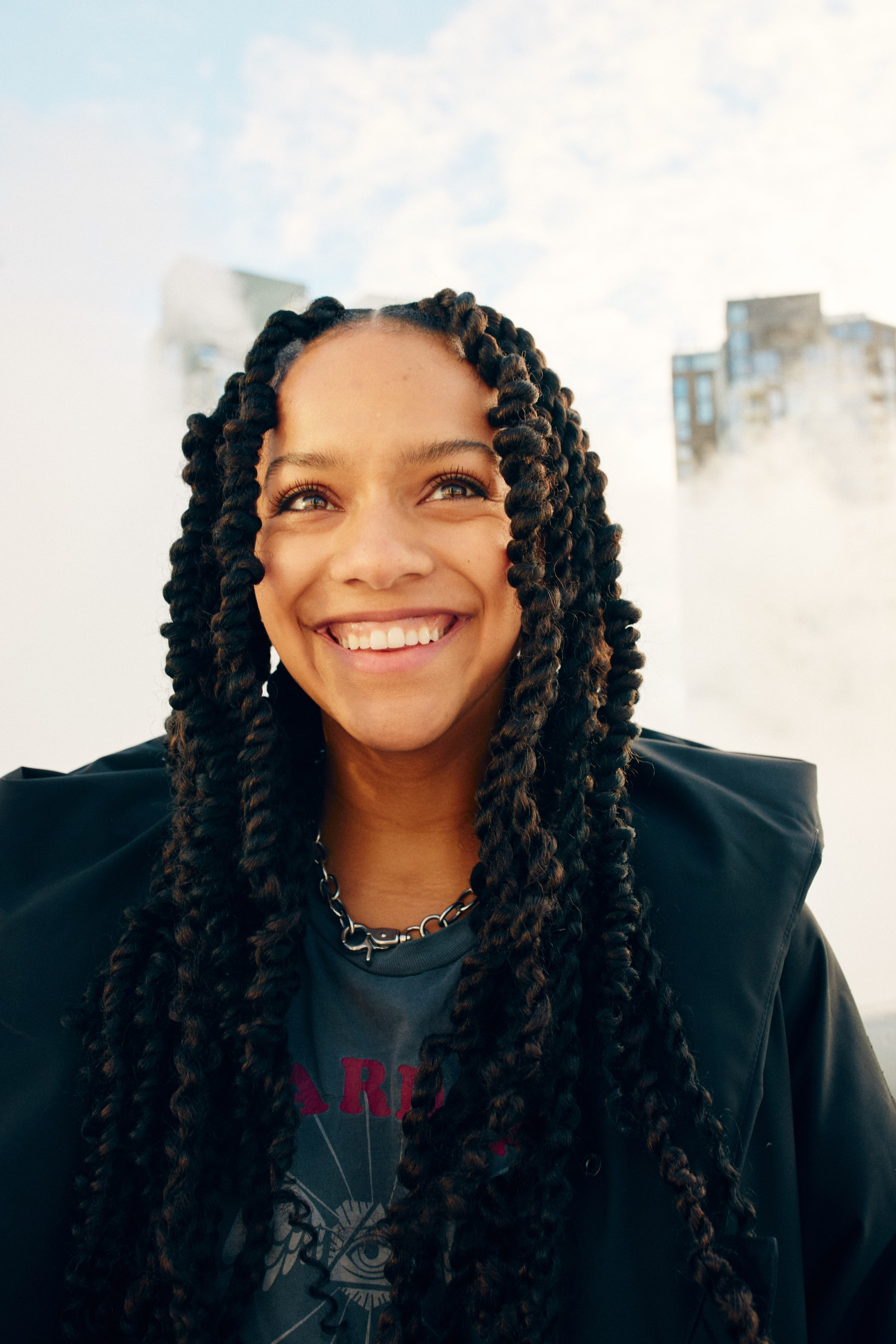
- Born: Russia

Djouliet Amara is a Canadian actress and dancer. She is known for her role as Trina Hubbard in The Big Door Prize, and Viv in Fitting In (2024).

== Early life and education ==
Amara was born in Russia. Her family emigrated from Russia and Sierra Leone to Winnipeg, Manitoba, where she was raised. Amara grew up dancing and competed in dance competitions as a child. She attended Fordham University at its Lincoln Center campus, studying dance and psychology in the Ailey/Fordham BFA Program.

== Career ==
Amara's started dancing, and advanced to a professional in New York City. She worked at Alvin Ailey American Dance Theater as an apprentice.

She launched her acting career after landing the role of Rosalind in the 2021 horror film Seance starring Suki Waterhouse. She featured on shows including Riverdale as Nancy Woods, Superman & Lois as Aubrey, Devil in Ohio as Tatiana, and on Emmy-nominated CBC and BET+ series The Porter as Corrine.

Amara booked her first lead role in Apple TV+ comedy series The Big Door Prize, playing Trina Hubbard, daughter of Dusty (Chris O'Dowd) and Cass (Gabrielle Dennis). The series was renewed for a second season, which premiered in April 2024.

Amara stars in the upcoming traumady Fitting In, directed by Molly McGlynn. She acts alongside Maddie Ziegler as Viv, best friend of Ziegler's character Lindy.

Other credits include Lulu in Guilty Party, Angie Brooks in So Help Me Todd, and Tess in Hello, Goodbye, and Everything in Between.

Amara was named one of CBC's Rising Stars for 2024.

== Personal life ==
Amara currently resides in New York City. She is bisexual.

== Filmography ==
Film
| Year | Title | Role | Notes | Ref. |
|---|---|---|---|---|
| 2020 | Tales from the Hood 3 | Grace | | |
| 2021 | Seance | Rosalind | | |
| 2022 | Hello, Goodbye, and Everything in Between | Tess | | |
| 2023 | Fitting In | Vivian | | |

Television
| Year | Title | Role | Notes | Ref. |
|---|---|---|---|---|
| 2021 | Riverdale | Nancy Woods | Episode: "Chapter Ninety-One: The Return of the Pussycats" | |
| 2021 | Guilty Party | Lulu | 4 episodes | |
| 2022 | The Porter | Corrine | 4 episodes | |
| 2022 | Superman & Lois | Aubrey | 2 episodes | |
| 2022 | Devil in Ohio | Tatiana Nelson | 4 episodes | |
| 2022 | So Help Me Todd | Angie Brooks | Episode: "Big Bang Theories" | |
| 2023–2024 | The Big Door Prize | Trina Hubbard | Main role | |
| 2025 | Watson | Molly Jones/Linda Mancini | Episode: "Wait for the Punchline" | |
| 2025 | Irish Blood | Tess | Main role | |
