= The Big Door Prize (novel) =

2020 novel by M. O. Walsh

- First edition cover
- Author: M.O. Walsh
- Language: English
- Genre: Science fiction, comedy
- Published: September 8, 2020
- Publisher: G.P. Putnam's Sons
- Publication place: United States
- Media type: Print (hardcover), e-book, audiobook
- Pages: 370
- ISBN: 978-0735218482
- OCLC: 1124530965
- Dewey Decimal: 813.6

The Big Door Prize is a 2020 science fiction comedy novel by M.O. Walsh, author of My Sunshine Away. It was published on September 8, 2020 by G.P. Putnam's Sons. The story follows a mysterious machine in a local grocery store of the town of Deerfield which shows people's true life potential, which leads residents to change their lives.

Apple TV+ and Skydance Media released a series adaptation on March 29, 2023, which was cancelled after two seasons.

== Premise ==
In a small town of Deerfield, Louisiana, a DNAMIX machine appears at the town's local grocery store, giving people their life's potential such as former teachers, nurses, and shopkeepers who pursue their destinies as magicians, cowboys, and athletes. Douglas Hubbard and his wife, Cherilyn, lived a happy and uncomplicated marriage in town before it starts to fall apart when they used the machine.

== Reception ==
Publishers Weekly gave a starred review, saying "Walsh follows these characters with humor and compassion, leading them to an ending readers will find surprising and satisfying". Kirkus Reviews states the book is "an eccentric, well-written small-town novel jam-packed with appealing characters and their dreams". Michel Sabbagh of Southern Review of Books notes that the novel can at times be slow-paced or have "far-fetched" qualities, but concluded that it "never loses sight of the human element". Booklist and BookPage awarded it starred reviews while both The Book Reporter and The Arts Desk also raved about the novel.

== Television adaptation ==
In May 2021, Apple TV+ had greenlit a series adaptation based on the book, with David West Read as showrunner and produced by Skydance Television and Studio Dragon. Season 1 was released on March 29, 2023, while season 2 was released on April 24, 2024. However, it was later cancelled on June 2024 without a renewal of a potential third season.
