= List of Schitt's Creek episodes =

Episodes of the Canadian sitcom

Schitt's Creek is a Canadian television sitcom that premiered on CBC Television on January 13, 2015. The series was created by Eugene Levy and Dan Levy and produced by Not a Real Company Productions. On January 12, 2015, CBC renewed the show for a second season, which premiered January 12, 2016, and consisted of 13 episodes. On February 17, 2016, the CBC announced that they renewed the show for a third season, and began broadcasting the third season on January 10, 2017. The fourth season began on January 9, 2018, in Canada and January 24 on Pop TV in the United States.

The series stars Eugene Levy and Catherine O'Hara as Johnny and Moira Rose, a wealthy couple who are forced, after losing all their money, to rebuild their lives in their only remaining asset: the small town of Schitt's Creek, which they once purchased as a joke, where they are living with their two adult children in two adjacent rooms of a rundown motel. The cast also includes Dan Levy, Annie Murphy, Chris Elliott, Jennifer Robertson and Emily Hampshire.

Over the course of the series, 80 episodes of Schitt's Creek aired in Canada and the United States. The final episode, airing April 7, 2020, received the highest ratings in the history of the program with 1.3 million viewers.

== Series overview ==
Season	Episodes	Originally released	
Season	Episodes	First released	Last released
1	13	January 13, 2015	March 31, 2015
2	13	January 12, 2016	March 29, 2016
3	13	January 10, 2017	April 4, 2017
4	13	January 9, 2018	December 19, 2018
5	14	January 8, 2019	April 9, 2019
6	14	January 7, 2020	April 7, 2020

== Episodes ==
=== Season 1 (2015) ===
No. overall	No. in season	Title	Directed by	Written by	Original release date	Prod. code	Canadian viewers (millions)
1	1	"Our Cup Runneth Over"	Jerry Ciccoritti	Daniel Levy	January 13, 2015	262452-1	1.359
2	2	"The Drip"	Jerry Ciccoritti	Chris Pozzebon	January 13, 2015	262452-2	1.366
3	3	"Don't Worry, It's His Sister"	Paul Fox	Michael Short	January 20, 2015	262452-3	1.266
4	4	"Bad Parents"	Jerry Ciccoritti	Kevin White	January 27, 2015	262452-4	0.834
5	5	"The Cabin"	Paul Fox	Amanda Walsh	February 3, 2015	262452-5	0.724
6	6	"Wine and Roses"	Jerry Ciccoritti	Kevin White	February 10, 2015	262452-6	0.759
7	7	"Turkey Shoot"	Paul Fox	Story by : Michael Grassi; Teleplay by : Daniel Levy	February 17, 2015	262452-7	0.688
8	8	"Allez-Vous"	Paul Fox	Chris Pozzebon	February 24, 2015	262452-8	N/A
9	9	"Carl's Funeral"	Jerry Ciccoritti	Kevin White	March 3, 2015	262452-9	0.837
10	10	"Honeymoon"	Jerry Ciccoritti	Daniel Levy	March 10, 2015	262452-10	N/A
11	11	"Little Sister"	Paul Fox	Michael Short	March 17, 2015	262452-11	0.622
12	12	"Surprise Party"	Paul Fox	Chris Pozzebon	March 24, 2015	262452-12	N/A
13	13	"Town for Sale"	Jerry Ciccoritti	Teleplay by : Kevin White; Story by : Daniel Levy	March 31, 2015	262452-13	0.872

=== Season 2 (2016) ===
No. overall	No. in season	Title	Directed by	Written by	Original release date	Prod. code	Canadian viewers (millions)
14	1	"Finding David"	Jerry Ciccoritti	Daniel Levy	January 12, 2016	262452-14	0.808
15	2	"Family Dinner"	Jerry Ciccoritti	David West Read	January 12, 2016	262452-15	0.775
16	3	"Jazzagals"	Paul Fox	Michael Short	January 19, 2016	262452-16	N/A
17	4	"Estate Sale"	Jerry Ciccoritti	Teresa Pavlinek	January 26, 2016	262452-17	0.656
18	5	"Bob's Bagels"	Paul Fox	Chris Pozzebon and Daniel Levy	February 2, 2016	262452-18	N/A
19	6	"Moira vs. Town Council"	Jerry Ciccoritti	Daniel Levy	February 9, 2016	262452-19	N/A
20	7	"The Candidate"	Paul Fox	Kevin White	February 16, 2016	262452-20	N/A
21	8	"Milk Money"	Paul Fox	Michael Short	February 23, 2016	262452-21	N/A
22	9	"Moira's Nudes"	Jerry Ciccoritti	David West Read	March 1, 2016	262452-22	N/A
23	10	"Ronnie's Party"	Paul Fox	Matt Kippen	March 8, 2016	262452-23	N/A
24	11	"The Motel Guest"	Jerry Ciccoritti	Kevin White	March 15, 2016	262452-24	N/A
25	12	"Lawn Signs"	Jerry Ciccoritti	Kevin White	March 22, 2016	262452-25	N/A
26	13	"Happy Anniversary"	Paul Fox	Daniel Levy	March 29, 2016	262452-26	N/A

=== Season 3 (2017) ===
No. overall	No. in season	Title	Directed by	Written by	Original release date	Prod. code	Canadian viewers (millions)
27	1	"Opening Night"	T. W. Peacocke	Daniel Levy	January 10, 2017	262452-27	0.992
28	2	"The Throuple"	T. W. Peacocke	David West Read	January 17, 2017	262452-28	N/A
29	3	"New Car"	Paul Fox	Kevin White	January 24, 2017	262452-29	N/A
30	4	"Driving Test"	Paul Fox	Michael Short	January 31, 2017	262452-30	N/A
31	5	"Rooms by the Hour"	T. W. Peacocke	Monica Heisey and Daniel Levy	February 7, 2017	262452-31	N/A
32	6	"Murder Mystery"	T. W. Peacocke	Michael Short	February 14, 2017	262452-32	N/A
33	7	"General Store"	Paul Fox	Daniel Levy	February 21, 2017	262452-33	N/A
34	8	"Motel Review"	Paul Fox	Kevin White	February 28, 2017	262452-34	N/A
35	9	"The Affair"	T. W. Peacocke	David West Read	March 7, 2017	262452-35	N/A
36	10	"Sebastien Raine"	T. W. Peacocke	Kevin White	March 14, 2017	262452-36	N/A
37	11	"Stop Saying Lice!"	Paul Fox	Daniel Levy	March 21, 2017	262452-37	N/A
38	12	"Friends & Family"	Paul Fox	David West Read	March 28, 2017	262452-38	N/A
39	13	"Grad Night"	T. W. Peacocke	Kevin White and Daniel Levy	April 4, 2017	262452-39	N/A

=== Season 4 (2018) ===
No. overall	No. in season	Title	Directed by	Written by	Original release date	Prod. code
40	1	"Dead Guy in Room 4"	Bruce McCulloch	Daniel Levy	January 9, 2018	262452-40
Moira fears she had a hand in a hotel guest's death. Stevie and Johnny work together to distract the other hotel guests from the body's removal. David and Patrick make things official. Alexis helps Ted find her replacement.
41	2	"Pregnancy Test"	Sturla Gunnarsson	David West Read	January 16, 2018	262452-41
A positive pregnancy test throws the Roses into a tailspin. Alexis finds Elmdale College is not all it's cracked up to be in the brochure. In search of some privacy, David and Patrick run into a surprise guest at Stevie's apartment.
42	3	"Asbestos Fest"	Bruce McCulloch	Monica Heisey	January 23, 2018	262452-42
Moira may have bitten off more than she can chew headlining Asbestos Fest. Alexis proves a valuable asset at Rose Apothecary. Johnny extends a helping hand and a new job to help Roland cover baby expenses.
43	4	"Girls' Night"	Sturla Gunnarsson	Michael Short	January 30, 2018	262452-43
Alexis turns to Twyla for comfort and a girls' night out. David tries to learn to compromise at the Apothecary. David and Patrick hit an important milestone.
44	5	"RIP Moira Rose"	Bruce McCulloch	Rupinder Gill	February 6, 2018	262452-44
Moira enjoys accolades following a false rumour that she has died. Roland asks Johnny an important question. David and Alexis share an awkward lunch with Ted and Heather. Alexis gets vulnerable with David.
45	6	"Open Mic"	Bruce McCulloch	Daniel Levy and Rebecca Kohler	February 27, 2018	262452-45
Patrick proposes an open mic night at Rose Apothecary, much to David's consternation. Alexis develops a promotional strategy for the motel. Johnny does something meaningful for Stevie. Moira tries to keep the gender of Roland and Jocelyn's baby a secret.
46	7	"The Barbecue"	Sturla Gunnarsson	David West Read	March 6, 2018	262452-46
Prompted by Patrick and David's four month anniversary, the Roses plan a barbecue. Alexis meets a new friend in the hotel lobby. David and Patrick hit a rough patch.
47	8	"The Jazzaguy"	Sturla Gunnarsson	Kevin White	March 13, 2018	262452-47
Alexis tries her hand at a local dating app. Stevie persuades David to spend a day at the spa with her, prompting a meaningful conversation. Johnny accidentally joins the Jazzagals, and Moira has a realization.
48	9	"The Olive Branch"	Bruce McCulloch	Rupinder Gill	March 20, 2018	262452-48
Alexis earns a college degree and quickly forms a business plan. Moira inadvertently steals her first pitch. Patrick pours his heart into his attempts to reconcile with David. Johnny gets Stevie a baffling gift. David extends his own olive branch.
49	10	"Baby Sprinkle"	Bruce McCulloch	David West Read	March 27, 2018	262452-49
David is roped into throwing a "sprinkle" for Jocelyn on short notice. Moira and Johnny do some participatory research at a dating agency. Alexis runs into some old friends and is offered a ticket out of Schitts Creek.
50	11	"The Rollout"	Sturla Gunnarsson	Michael Short	April 3, 2018	262452-50
A mystery rash strikes Stevie and David after using Rose Apothecary products. Moira and Jocelyn are called for jury duty. An old beau makes a return, and Alexis makes an important confession to Ted.
51	12	"Singles Week"	Sturla Gunnarsson	Daniel Levy	April 10, 2018	262452-51
Moira is delayed in kicking off Singles Week by Jocelyn's unexpected labour. Patrick and David grow closer than ever. Alexis proves she has what it takes to stand on her own two feet. Musical chairs ends in a surprise appearance from Ted. Jocelyn and Roland bestow an honour on Moira.
52	13	"Merry Christmas, Johnny Rose"	Andrew Cividino and Daniel Levy	Daniel Levy	December 18, 2018	262452-52
Johnny tries to drum up excitement for Christmas Eve celebrations with the family, to a less than enthused reception. Alexis feels the pressure of proving herself to Ted's friends. Moira arranges a surprise to give Johnny the Christmas Eve he hoped for.

=== Season 5 (2019) ===
No. overall	No. in season	Title	Directed by	Written by	Original release date	Prod. code
53	1	"The Crowening"	Laurie Lynd	Daniel Levy	January 8, 2019	262452-53
While Moira is in Bosnia filming the Crows movie that she hopes will revive her acting career, Johnny starts doing all the work at the motel to compensate for missing her. David attempts to reinvigorate his relationship with Patrick by going on a ropes course outing with Alexis and Ted. Moira convinces the lackadaisical director of Crows that it is not necessarily the disaster-in-the-making he believes it is.
54	2	"Love Letters"	Laurie Lynd	David West Read	January 15, 2019	262452-54
A sleep-deprived Moira returns to Schitt's Creek and is despondent to find a stack of old love letters addressed to Johnny from another woman. David and Stevie are held up at David's store and are embarrassed afterwards by how much they gave away. Alexis trades some of her jewelry to Twyla in return for a locket she had regifted from Ted. Johnny reminds Moira that she herself had sent the love letters to him, while she was method-acting by taking real painkillers for her soap opera role.
55	3	"The Plant"	Jordan Canning	Rupinder Gill	January 22, 2019	262452-55
Alexis and Johnny plan for Stevie to act as a guest to impress an influential reviewer. While David and Patrick search for a new apartment, David believes they are about to get an apartment together, when Patrick only meant to invite David along to look at apartments for himself. Stevie and the reviewer hit it off personally and she reveals the con, but he writes a positive review anyway.
56	4	"The Dress"	Jordan Canning	Rupinder Gill	January 29, 2019	262452-56
Johnny finds himself under financial pressure with the arrival of Moira's high-priced red carpet gown for the Crows movie premiere. Alexis finds out that Ted had had a one-night stand with his current assistant before Alexis and Ted resumed dating. David is conned into taking a road trip with Stevie, who meets up with Emir, the hotel reviewer, again.
57	5	"Housewarming"	Laurie Lynd	Daniel Levy and Rupinder Gill	February 5, 2019	262452-57
David and Patrick throw a housewarming pajama party in which Ted finally lets loose, while Johnny and Moira try their best to babysit Roland Jr. for the evening. While playing spin-the-bottle, an intoxicated Ted kisses David, making Alexis and Patrick jealous.
58	6	"Rock On!"	Laurie Lynd	David West Read	February 12, 2019	262452-58
Moira and the Jazzagals take Jocelyn out for a night at the casino. Johnny walks in on Stevie while she is taking a topless photo to send to Emir, resulting in some awkwardness. David encourages Patrick to go on a date with a customer who had given Patrick his number; David realizes he made a mistake, but Patrick arrives to the motel and says that he was unable to go through with the date, and is interested only in David.
59	7	"A Whisper of Desire"	Jordan Canning	Michael Short	February 19, 2019	262452-59
Johnny incorrectly suspects that Ted’s mom is attracted to him, while Moira cannot resist getting involved in Jocelyn's local musical production of Cabaret. David benefits from a potential supplier's mistaken belief that Roland Jr. is David's baby.
60	8	"The Hospies"	Jordan Canning	Rupinder Gill	February 26, 2019	262452-60
Johnny and Stevie attend the regional hospitality awards, while Moira does everything in her power to stop Alexis from auditioning for Cabaret. After pursuing a long weekend with Emir, he breaks up with her instead, leaving Stevie upset. Johnny takes her home instead of staying for the after-party. After Alexis' disastrous audition, Moira offers Stevie the lead in Cabaret.
61	9	"The M.V.P."	Jordan Canning	David West Read	March 5, 2019	262452-61
David and Johnny agree to sub in for the annual baseball game on opposite teams as a favor to Patrick and Roland, respectively. Johnny, who would rather see David succeed, ends up throwing the game when David gets a hit in the ninth inning. Stevie does not enjoy being in the show, but Moira talks to her and raises her confidence.
62	10	"Roadkill"	Jordan Canning	Michael Short	March 12, 2019	262452-62
Johnny accidentally hits a cat and is pressured to break the news to the adult daughter of the owners. David has a run-in with an old colleague, who has a business very similar to Rose Apothecary and is found to be selling counterfeit goods. Alexis is left in charge of David's store and ends up having sex with Ted there, causing damage.
63	11	"Meet the Parents"	Jordan Canning	Daniel Levy	March 19, 2019	262452-63
In town for Patrick's surprise birthday party, his parents are shocked when Johnny, thinking they know, reveals Patrick is gay and in a relationship with David. David is forced to tell Patrick of the disclosure and of the party, and Patrick decides to come out to his parents at the party. When he does, they both immediately reassure Patrick of their love for him; their "shock" was that he had been too afraid to tell them already. Moira gets coaxed into going to a soap opera convention with Alexis, where she runs into a soap actress colleague who tells her that they should embrace the easy money of the convention circuit and accept that their careers are over.
64	12	"The Roast"	Laurie Lynd	David West Read	March 26, 2019	262452-64
Ted suggests a trip with Alexis, but they have very different ideas of the ideal vacation destination. It emerges that Ted was accepted into a very selective six-month research program in the Galápagos Islands, but he says that he will decline the chance. After Alexis realizes that she has been selfish, she agrees to go along. Johnny fills in for Moira at the annual Mayor’s Roast, as David distracts Moira from finding out that Stevie and Patrick have been taking private dance lessons.
65	13	"The Hike"	Laurie Lynd	Daniel Levy	April 2, 2019	262452-65
Patrick and David go on a romantic hike, but argue when David complains constantly. After Patrick injures his foot, they decide to continue anyway. At the spot planned for a picnic, Patrick proposes, and David accepts. Everyone panics over Johnny's health scare, but it turns out to be a minor issue.
66	14	"Life Is a Cabaret"	Daniel Levy and Andrew Cividino	Daniel Levy	April 9, 2019	262452-66
It's opening night for Cabaret and Stevie disappears after David shares news of his engagement to her. David and Patrick decide to wait till the musical is over to share their news, but when Stevie vanishes the news quickly spreads. Stevie turns up just before the show starts and delivers a masterful performance. At the afterparty at the motel, David tries to make his big announcement, but keeps getting interrupted by people who already know. Moira's movie, The Crows, is shelved, and Moira is shattered by the news, locking herself in a closet.

=== Season 6 (2020) ===
No. overall	No. in season	Title	Directed by	Written by	Original release date	Prod. code	Canadian viewers (millions)
67	1	"Smoke Signals"	Daniel Levy	Daniel Levy	January 7, 2020	262452-67	N/A
68	2	"The Incident"	Jordan Canning	Daniel Levy	January 14, 2020	262452-68	N/A
69	3	"The Job Interview"	Andrew Cividino	Michael Short	January 21, 2020	262452-69	N/A
70	4	"Maid of Honour"	Andrew Cividino	Kurt Smeaton	January 28, 2020	262452-70	N/A
71	5	"The Premiere"	Andrew Cividino	David West Read	February 4, 2020	262452-71	N/A
72	6	"The Wingman"	Donna Croce	David West Read	February 11, 2020	262452-72	N/A
73	7	"Moira Rosé"	Jordan Canning	David West Read	February 18, 2020	262452-73	N/A
74	8	"The Presidential Suite"	Andrew Cividino	David West Read	February 25, 2020	262452-74	N/A
75	9	"Rebound"	Jordan Canning	Michael Short	March 3, 2020	262452-75	N/A
76	10	"Sunrise, Sunset"	Jordan Canning	Kurt Smeaton & Winter Tekenos-Levy	March 10, 2020	262452-76	N/A
77	11	"The Bachelor Party"	Andrew Cividino	David West Read	March 17, 2020	262452-77	N/A
78	12	"The Pitch"	Andrew Cividino	Daniel Levy	March 24, 2020	262452-78	N/A
79	13	"Start Spreading the News"	Jordan Canning	Daniel Levy	March 31, 2020	262452-79	N/A
80	14	"Happy Ending"	Andrew Cividino & Daniel Levy	Daniel Levy	April 7, 2020	262452-80	1.221

=== Special (2020) ===
No.	Title	Directed by	Written by	Original release date
81	"Best Wishes, Warmest Regards: A Schitt's Creek Farewell"	Amy Segal	Amy Segal	April 7, 2020
