= The Electric Company (2009 TV series) =

Television series

- Also known as: The New Electric Company
- Genre: Educational television
- Created by: Paul Dooley; Joan Ganz Cooney; Lloyd Morrisett
- Developed by: Karen Fowler
- Starring: Priscilla Diaz; Jenni Barber; Josh Segarra; Ricky Smith; Dominic Colón; Ashley Austin Morris; William Jackson Harper; Sandie Rosa; Chris "Shockwave" Sullivan; Coy Stewart; Carly Rose Sonenclar
- Country of origin: United States
- Original language: English
- No. of seasons: 3
- No. of episodes: 52 (list of episodes)

Production
- Production locations: Kaufman Astoria Studios; New York, NY; Newark, NJ
- Running time: 28 minutes
- Production company: Sesame Workshop

Original release
- Network: PBS Kids (Note: Aired part of PBS Kids Go!.)
- Release: January 23, 2009 – April 4, 2011

The Electric Company is an American educational children's television series produced by Sesame Workshop and developed by Karen Fowler. It is a reboot of the 1971 series of the same name. The series aired on PBS Kids from January 23, 2009, to April 4, 2011 with reruns continuing on PBS until August 31, 2014. The series also aired reruns on HBO Kids on HBO Family from January 1, 2016, until November 1, 2020, as part of HBO's deal with Sesame Workshop. On some services, the series is called The New Electric Company to distinguish it from the 1971–77 series.

== Premise ==
The new version has similar short animations, parodies, sketches, and music videos to those seen in the original show, but each episode also features a story line designed to teach four to five vocabulary words with a mix of hip-hop or contemporary R&B-style music.

Each story revolves around the Electric Company, a group of tween and teen literacy heroes who battle a group of neighborhood vandals dubbed the Pranksters. The heroes' headquarters is the Electric Diner, where their friend Shock, a beat-boxing short-order cook who also appears in the short-form segments, resides.

In a nod to the original series, each episode's opening has a Company member call on the others to assemble by yelling "Hey, you guys!" – a line that (as yelled by Rita Moreno) led off the opening sequence of seasons two, five, and six. In "Scrambled Brains", Annie announces the opening line, as her normal character had switched bodies with Lisa. Other nods to the original series include appearances by Paul the Gorilla and updated versions of the soft-shoe silhouette segments in which words are sounded out.

The revival includes interactive Web elements and is promoted and extended via community-outreach projects. The first season consisted of 28 weekly episodes. A second season consisting of twelve episodes began airing on January 18, 2010. A third season debuted on February 7, 2011, and ended on April 4, 2011, with new Company member Marcus and new Prankster Gilda. Later airings of episodes omit Jessica saying the five words and went straight to the episode.

== Characters ==
=== Main ===
Character	Actor / Actress	Season(s)		
Character	Actor / Actress	Season 1	Season 2	Season 3
Hector Ruiz	Josh Segarra	Main	Main	Main
Lisa Heffenbacher	Jenni Barber	Main	Main	Guest
Jessica Ruiz	Priscilla Star Diaz	Main	Main	Main
Keith Watson	Ricky Smith	Main	Main	Main
Marcus Barnes	Coy Stewart	—N/a	—N/a	Main
Francine Carruthers	Ashley Austin Morris	Main	Main	Main
Manny Spamboni	Dominic Colón	Main	Main	Main
Danny Rebus	William Jackson Harper	Main	Main	Main
Annie Scrambler	Sandie Rosa	Main	Main	Main
Gilda Flip	Carly Rose Sonenclar	—N/a	—N/a	Main
Shock	Chris Sullivan	Recurring	Recurring	Recurring
Mario	Lin-Manuel Miranda	Recurring	Recurring	Recurring
Leo Watson	L. Steven Taylor	Recurring	Guest	—N/a
P.J. Watson	Kyle Massey	Guest	Recurring	—N/a

=== The Electric Company ===
The Electric Company consists of a group of five friends who protect the neighborhood from the Pranksters. They all have the power to throw wordballs, blue magical balls that create words on any surface. Each member has a special skill.

- Hector Ruiz (played by Josh Segarra) is the oldest member and leader of the Electric Company, who has the power to replay any image that he sees, much like a video camera. Hector is very athletic, showing particular skill at basketball. He once had a fear of beetles. In season 3, he becomes the new owner of the Electric Diner. Hector is always the one to go to if there is trouble, and he also has a strong rivalry with Manny due to a limerick contest many years ago, going back to when they were kids. He is friendly with Danny, even though they share a similar rivalry.
- Jessica Ruiz (played by Priscilla "Star" Diaz) is Hector's younger sister who is a talented rapper. Jessica has a power similar to her brother's – she can replay any word or phrase that she hears, much like a tape recorder. Jessica is confident, yet occasionally brash, especially when it comes to dealing with the Pranksters, particularly Manny. She loves to rap. She also looks after Marcus, as he is the youngest and newest member of the Electric Company. Jessica became the host of the vocabulary segment at the beginning of each episode starting with "The Limerick Slam".
- Keith Watson (played by Ricky Smith) is the member of the Electric Company who can generate images in mid-air, which especially comes in handy when explaining difficult words, and can also magnify images as well. Keith is logical and level-headed and frequently creates solutions for dealing with the Pranksters' tricks. Keith is good at basketball, like Hector. Keith first discovered his power while playing Horse with Hector when saying he wanted an E and threw a wordball at the word. His father was the original owner of the Electric Diner.
- Lisa Heffenbacher (played by Jenni Barber) is a pretty, well-liked girl who has the power to unscramble any anagram that she finds. Lisa is very smart and excels at science. She has a strong and constant rivalry with Annie, since the latter caused numerous headaches for her. In the season 3 premiere, it is revealed in a hovering TV screen that she is traveling with a science program. However, Hector keeps her posted with what's happening in the neighborhood. She was seemingly written off the show, although Jenni Barber did do a few educational commercials for The Electric Company during that season.
- Marcus Barnes (played by Coy Stewart) is the newest and youngest member of the Electric Company, who made his introduction in season 3. He first discovered his wordball power while playing baseball. He has math skills as his powers and uses them to effectively solve math problems. He likes numbers, has good athletic abilities, and always has a craving for waffles with a love of pickles. Francine suspiciously refers to him as Marty Farms.

==== Allies ====
- Shock (played by Chris "Shockwave" Sullivan himself) is a short-order cook at the Electric Diner, where the Company converges when trouble occurs. Shock rarely speaks directly, instead he beatboxes and uses his hands to act out ideas. In later episodes, however, he speaks normally. He appears in some segments with Jessica, particularly the closing segment.
- P.J. Watson (played by Kyle Massey) is Keith's eccentric cousin who appeared in season 2. He starred in Lisa's movie and got help from her to write a paper from back home about an old Western story in a refrigerator.
- Leo Watson (played by L. Steven Taylor) is the proprietor of the Electric Diner and Keith's father. In Season 3, he opens up a new restaurant and passes the diner to Hector, who becomes the owner.
- The Great Calvero (played by Jason Antoon) is the local magician who performs in the park.
- Bandini is Calvero's brother, who was trapped in a painting, but the Electric Company got him out of the painting and reunited him with Calvero.
- Mario (played by Lin-Manuel Miranda) is Shock's best friend and a hip-hop MC. He makes guest appearances along with Shock in some musical segments.
- Sammy Spamboni (played by Sean Mana) is Manny's younger brother, who was frozen by Manny many times but gave the Electric Company advice on to how unfreeze Keith.
- Paul the Gorilla (played by Steven Freitas) was a recurring character on the original show and was the only character brought back for the new series. In the new incarnation, however, he is far more restrained and less vocal.
- Dax (played by James Miles) is a Skeleckian and a good friend of Lisa's who sometimes gets the company tied up in his issues, such as getting shrunk and having a steering wheel stolen, and almost getting some cheese stolen by the Pranksters.
- Polly Hashimoto (played by Ann Harada) is a local author whose books are found in the library. She appears in the episode "One Smart Cookie".
- Emily is a friend of Marcus Barnes who dresses as George Washington during the 4th of July celebration in one episode.
- Wiki Wiki Walter (played by Joshua Torrez) is Shock's old friend who appeared in an episode as the titular character. It is revealed that he was the one who taught Shock how to beatbox. However, after Shock beats him in a beatboxing match, he called off their relationship. They eventually reconciled near the end of the episode.
- Charles Abercrombie is the head of the Block association who camp to Sigmund's tent for petitions signed by neighbors of to remove the tent permanently because of the welcoming.
- Benny is Hector and Jessica's pet dog.
- Amy Scrambler (played by Emma Kantor) is Annie's younger sister who Annie babysat in "He's Not Frozen, He's Immobile".
- Jules (played by Aleisha Allen) is Jessica's old friend who moved Minnehaha where they held the Hamster Olympics. She came to visit for Jessica's birthday.

==== The Heffenbacher Family ====
The following family members only appear in the second-season episode:

- Caroline (played by Deborah Rush) is Lisa's mother. When asked, she reveals the family tree of the Heffenbachers and then says to her daughter that Cordelia was a traitor.
- Mildred is Lisa's aunt. She generously allows her niece and her friends to find out about Cordelia.
- Cordelia Heffenbacher (also portrayed by Jenni Barber) is Lisa's great-great-great-great-great-great aunt. She was first mentioned by Annie Scrambler saying that she was a traitor, but Lisa proves that Annie was wrong. Cordelia distracted the British Redcoats by offering them donuts.

=== The Pranksters ===
The Pranksters are the Electric Company's enemies. Unlike the Electric Company, only Francine has the ability to throw word balls, and the Pranksters are only occasionally seen all together.

- Francine Carruthers (played by Ashley Austin Morris) is the vandalistic leader of the Pranksters. She has the same power as the Electric Company – the ability to generate wordballs, except that hers are violet. Francine has a very high opinion of her own intelligence. Most of her plots involve making herself look good at the expense of the company. In Season 3, she gets an assistant named Gilda Flip. She usually calls Marcus "Marty Farms" and usually gets 100 to 200 presents for her birthday.
- Annie Scrambler (played by Sandie Rosa) is a selfish, bratty girl who is frequently envious of the accomplishments of others. She has the power to scramble any word or sentence with a stomp of her foot which results in making new words, but sometimes she scrambles existing words to create nonexistent ones. Annie is often jealous of the Electric Company's good luck and sometimes works with her Uncle Sigmund, who is a noted hypnotist, to get back at her rivals. She also is a beginner hypnotist learning from Uncle Sigmund. She will work with the Electric Company if she has to, such as to help her uncle out in "Bananas".
- Danny Rebus (played by William Jackson Harper) is a suave, sophisticated Prankster. He can turn any sentence into a rebus puzzle. Most of his messages make fun of the Electric Company. Danny is very proud, yet has a touchy personality, being easily offended. He often accuses the Electric Company of making him look bad, promising vengeance. He has helped the Electric Company out on occasion when it benefits him. Despite being a Prankster, he is also the most moral member of the group. He is very loyal to whomever he considers his friend, although he feels he has to have a best friend, saying the Danny Rebus way is all or nothing. He seems to genuinely care about whoever is nice to him, not caring if they're pranksters or not.
- Manny Spamboni (played by Dominic Colón) He is the loudest of the Pranksters. He is the only member of the group (excluding Gilda) that does not have any powers, but he is quite skilled in the art of robotics and mechanics. Manny is rude and crude and uses his many gadgets to make trouble for the Electric Company. He is thought the world of by his mother, who says he is her "little angel", although she has put him in his place on occasion, such as chastising him for cheating at a limerick competition. Underneath this tough exterior, Manny does have a soft side. He genuinely cares for whatever he values in his heart and formed a friendship with Jessica over The Mighty Bright Night for an episode. Due to his selfishness, his and Jessica's friendship appeared to come to an end.
- Gilda Flip (played by Carly Rose Sonenclar) is the newest member of the Pranksters and Francine's assistant. Like Manny, she doesn't appear to have any powers, and her only gadget is her Flip Phone. Instead, she has a natural talent for planning as well as a wide variety of other small talents. The character is named for late comedy legend Gilda Radner.

==== Allies ====
- Sigmund Scrambler (played by Mark Linn-Baker) is Annie's uncle, who works as a hypnotist. He is slightly bumbling, but he helps Annie in her pursuit of bothering the Electric Company.
- Sandy Scrambler (played by Ana Gasteyer) is Annie's aunt, who is a hypnotist like Sigmund Scrambler.
- Antigone Carruthers (played by Julie Halston) is Francine's mother, who is the CEO of the Antigone Carruthers Corporation. She usually calls the Electric Company: "the Electricians". Like Francine, she has an inflated opinion of her own importance, and her idea of punishment for Francine's misdeeds are considered incredibly lenient by the Electric Company.
- Mrs. Bebe Spamboni (played by Andréa Burns) is Manny's mother. She thinks the world of Manny like any mother would but does never approve when he cheats.
- Sandy Rebus is Danny's dog, who gave the Electric Company a note in the episode: "Pies for Puppies".
- Buster Spamboni is the Spamboni's dog mentioned by Sammy telling his brother he forgot to walk him.
- Mrs. Scrambler is Annie and Amy's mother mentioned by Bebe and Amy.

=== Animated characters ===
==== The Adventures of Captain Cluck ====
- Captain Cluck (voiced by Isabella Palmieri) is a chicken-themed child superhero who has brown hair with high short, curled pigtails and wears a pink outfit with a matching mask and cape and also a star belt. She has the ability to correct things. In the "apostrophe-s" segment, passing ten minutes, she arranges a restaurant for all her chickens with separate plates to show whose corn belongs to.
- The Poultry Patrol are the chickens who belong to Captain Cluck. In one of the segments, they all have female names revealed with apostrophes and "s" at the end because they're hens. They are named Amy, Fay, Fran, Gin, Helen, Jan, Jen, Jean, Joan, June and Nan. Only one has not been named.
- The Lost Girl is a young black girl who only appears in the comma segment in which she is confused as she looks at her shopping list.
- Greg is a boy listening to music in headphones. He has been yelled at by his best friend.
- Farmer and Animals – He was confused on gender pronouns of his bull and cow, as well as not getting it right with his ducks, horses, pigs and sheep.
- Cheerleaders – The squad of five were very confused about the pronouns they and them.
- Baby and Mom – The Mother says the baby had a hard time understanding quotation marks.

==== Pets Home Alone ====
- Donny is a yellow canary with green wings and a matching tail. Donny likes to call all of his fur-covered friends "Fuzzball" and plays with Nuggets' hamster ball to pretend to be an astronaut.
- Nuggets is a magenta hamster who appears in some live action backgrounds.
- Petunia is a blue bulldog. She wears a pink hair bow. She sits next to the Mummy from "Haunted House" on the live-action bench and dislikes taking baths.
- Tom is an orange cat. He is very nice and shy and knows how to use a laptop.

==== Haunted House ====
- Werewolf (voiced by Leslie Carrara-Rudolph) is a werewolf with brown fur. He lives in a haunted house with Bat and Mummy. He has a black kitten named Mr. Sprinkles who Mummy and Bat babysat.
- Bat (voiced by Leslie Carrara-Rudolph) is the only flying monster. He lives in a haunted house with Werewolf and Mummy. Bat was once given a present by a monster which turned out to be a mini version of the monster.
- Mummy (voiced by Leslie Carrara-Rudolph) is a green-skinned mummy who wears toilet paper. He has an Indian accent. He lives in a haunted house with Bat and Werewolf. Mummy's favorite dessert is pie.
- Aunt Hildegard is a green-skinned witch with a turbo broomstick. She also has red goggles for flight.

==== Others ====
- The Three Orangutans (voiced by Dominic Colón, Jenni Barber and Josh Segarra, from left to right) demonstrate things with words that start with "gr", "fl", or "dr"; have "oo" or "ink"; or end with "mb", "ing", or "ed".
- Special Agent Jack Bowser (voiced by Tyler Bunch) is a blue dog who wears a turquoise sweater with a gray horizontal stripe on it and is trapped in the treats/things. As he tells us that something is about to explode, he utters, "I can't crack the code to get out! Help me read this." This sketch is a parody of the TV series 24 and in fact each sketch lasts 24 seconds.
- Music Man (played by Reggie Watts) is a deep-voiced singer who appears in many segments. He is the only animated character from the first two seasons to appear in the third season since he appeared in "Wordball Games," fully animated in a different style of Flash animation and actually had spoken dialogue for the first time. His new segments involve him doing some chores for his space alien neighbor and his other neighbor, Pesky Eddie. The segments are made in the style of a video game where at the opening, Music Man loses his first life and only has two lives left.
- The Pet Shop Owner is a wacky pet owner who owns many unusual pets, which causes his customers to leave. His customers were a white girl, black boy, Latino boy, and Asian girl. It was also revealed his brick, pickle, and jug are alive and can move. This segment was replaced with "Pets Home Alone".
- Josephine is an African American girl who wants to sell things to the people and the mummy who live in houses.
- Felix and Oscar are an animated take-off of The Odd Couple and appear in many segments. Felix is an elderly man wearing a green shirt who makes comments and Oscar is the dim-witted, lanky, and tall teenage boy who lives with Felix and has to live without most of his teeth, socks, or deodorant. Although their names aren't revealed, Felix was referred to as Old Man in one episode.
- The Two-Headed Long-Necked Monster is completely female and skilled at skiing and has light-green skin. In addition to calling each other dude, they often argue about the jacket they're wearing. One head with red eyes, lips, and antennae wants it zipped while the other head with blue eyes, lips, and antennae wants it unzipped. They both end up down the hill blaming each other and their purple hooded jacket loses its zipper.
- Wrack and Wreck are green and blue robots who love watching TV and eating bolts as a snack.
- Ray and Fay are blue monsters with horns on their heads. Ray tries to offer flowers to Fay who's sitting in a bench. She wears pigtails.

=== Celebrity cameos ===
The celebrities who have appeared on the show include Pete Wentz, Samantha Bee, Ne-Yo, Kelly Ripa, Mario, Sean Kingston, Marc Ecko, Jack McBrayer, Tiki Barber, Whoopi Goldberg, Kyle Massey, Common, Swizz Beatz, Good Charlotte, Jimmy Fallon, Dwight Howard, David Lee, Christopher Massey, Wyclef Jean, and Doug E. Fresh. Besides his brief appearances in season one, Kyle Massey had a recurring role in season two as PJ, Keith's eccentric cousin.

Mark Linn-Baker appeared occasionally as Annie's uncle Sigmund. Broadway actor-composer Lin-Manuel Miranda does occasional guest appearances and contributes music to the show. He also appears in a season-two episode as Mario, Shock's friend.

Tommy Kail, the director of Miranda's In the Heights, was one of the musical directors with Bill Sherman and the actor-musician Christopher Jackson, a star of the original Broadway production of that show. Members of the hip hop comedy troupe Freestyle Love Supreme (of which Miranda, Sherman, Jackson, and Sullivan are members) make sporadic appearances in the musical segments as well. Karen Olivo, who starred in In the Heights also appeared in some musical segments.

== Episodes ==
Season	Episodes	Originally released	
Season	Episodes	First released	Last released
1	28	January 23, 2009	October 1, 2009
2	12	January 18, 2010	May 7, 2010
3	12	February 7, 2011	April 4, 2011

=== Prankster Planet ===
A new series of two-minute animated shorts titled "The Adventures of The Electric Company on Prankster Planet" (often abbreviated to "Prankster Planet") were shown at the end of each episode of The Electric Company starting May 3, 2011, in order to promote the flash game of the same name on the PBS Kids website. The educational focus of both these shorts and the game expanded beyond reading and literacy, incorporating basic math skills as well.

In animated form, Jessica and Marcus visit the Pranksters' space base called Prankster Planet where the Electric Company's powers don't work, and pranksters reign supreme. Now powerless, Jessica and Marcus have to use their wits to hit 13 off buttons in order to disable Manny Spamboni's Wordsuckeruppenator, which is sucking up words from earth. In each short Jessica and Marcus attempt to overcome a obstacle created by one of the Pranksters, but the Pranksters prevent them from reaching the off button leading to Jessica and Marcus yelling "Hey, you guys!". The viewer is then encouraged to play the online game, in which you test your wits as well in platforming and math challenges created by the Pranksters in order to claim 3 items for each mission. right before the player could reach the button, a final multiple-choice segment recapping the math concepts from that mission need to be completed.

Following the success of the first Prankster Planet game, a sequel was released starting July 9, 2012, and aired alongside repackaged episodes of eight The Electric Company episodes from Season 1 and Season 2. This second game and accompanying shorts features Francine's Reverse-a-Ball machine, which reverses whatever words they touch, being fired from 8 Francine shaped launchers on prankster planet. In the shorts, Francine watches Jessica and Marcus attempt to shut off her Reverse-a-Ball launchers by pulling the large levers on them, along with a studio audience of Manny's robots. Francine announces "Survey Time" so the audience of robots can vote on one of three obstacles for the duo. The results are graphed and walked through by Francine. The 8 repackaged episodes that conclude with the animated shorts also were edited to include 3 Reverse-a-Balls reversing a word or phrase in the episodes; Francine brags about these at the beginning of each short. Unlike the main show and the first game, this game focused heavily on graphs and data interpretation skills but has very similar gameplay.

== Songs ==
=== From season 1 ===
- "We've Got Skills" – Hector, Jessica, and Lisa
- "Take the Pledge" – Keith, Hector, Jessica, Lisa
- "100% Human" – Hector
- "The Nature Lover" – Danny
- "Separate the Truth from the Lies" – Jessica
- "Are We Gonna Make It?" – Electric Company, Dax, Francine
- "Clue" – Electric Company
- "Chess Song" – Jessica
- "The Master Plan (of Spamboni Man)" – Manny
- "Basketball Song" – Lisa, Hector, Jessica, and Keith
- "Nice Girl" – Annie, Lisa, Electric Company, and street crowd
- "Ode To Calvero" – Marlin
- "Persevere" – Deek and Electric Company
- "We Are the Merry Prankster Band" – Annie Scrambler and Manny Spamboni (with Francine on the tuba)
- "Do The Orangachoke" – Lottie, Skeleckian Crowd, Danny and Electric Company
- "Step Up" – Hector and Lisa
- "The Limerick Slam" – Hector, Jessica, Manny and Mrs. Spamboni
- "There's No Right or Wrong In Art" – The Electric Company, Danny, and Bandini
- "Sigmund Scrambler's Habit-Breaking Hypnotism Tent Advertisement/The Last Note" – Annie, Lisa, Hector and Sigmund Scrambler (with Keith on the piano)
- "Keith's Birthday Song for Dad" – Keith and Electric Company
- "Follow Through" – Lisa
- "One Part You and One Part Me" – Lisa and Francine
- "Love" – Manny
- "Clear My Name" – Hector
- "Fluffy Cheese" – Lisa, Dax, Dax's Grandma and Electric Company
- "Special Skill" – Francine and Electric Company
- "Nobody's Perfect" – Jessica and Manny (with Lisa, Hector, and Harper as backup dancers)
- "The Danny Rebus Blues" – Danny (with the other Pranksters on backing vocals, the Electric Company on electric guitars (Hector and Keith), bass guitar (Lisa), & harmonica (Jessica), and Shock on drums)

=== From season 2 ===
- "Sheriff Frank vs. Negative Apple" – Mario and Danny
- "Follow the Clues" – Polly
- "Don't Undo Undanny" – Danny and Jessica
- "Scratch Your Back" – PJ Watson, Manny, and Electric Company
- "Separate the Truth from the Lies" – Lisa
- "The Francine Hotel Jingle" – Francine and Mrs. Carruthers
- "Compromise" – Electric Company and Pranksters
- "Down with the Skeleckians" – Jessica and Skeleckian crowd
- "Observe the Ape" – Sigmund, Natalie McNally, Lisa and Annie
- "Hey, Bluefoot (The Friendship Call)" – Manny and Electric Company
- "Good Friends Good as Gold" – Jessica, Jules, Danny, and Electric Company
- "Great" – Lisa and Cordelia Heffenbacher

=== From season 3 ===
- "Wordball on His What?" – Hector, Jessica and Marcus Barnes
- "Gilda Breaking Records" – Gilda Flip and kids
- "Here Come the Animals Dressed As Monsters" – Hector, Jessica, Marcus, Keith and Shock
- "Appreciate a Zero" – Danny and Annie
- "Little Puppies" – Jessica and puppies
- "The Electric Company Doesn't Like You" – Danny and Manny
- "Take Back This Return-a-Ball" – Francine, Gilda, Hector, Keith, Jessica, Marcus and chorus
- "Beatbox" – Doug E. Fresh and crowd
- "I Love My Power" – Manny and his robot
- "Add a Chicken" – Rob and chorus
- "Junior Assistant" – Francine, Hector and chorus

== Critical reception ==
The show received generally positive reviews from critics, and has a 74/100 score on Metacritic, based on eight reviews. Out of 18 Daytime Emmy nominations, the revival won 10, including three consecutive Outstanding Children's Series trophies.

Robert Lloyd of the Los Angeles Times called the story aspects of the show "unnecessarily complicated and off the point", citing that the 1970s series "spent more time teaching, at no cost to entertainment".

Entertainment Weekly said "Though the hip 'n' urban vibe seems overly calculated, did studies show that eight-year-olds respond to beatboxing white dudes? And the cast is aggressively up with people. You gotta love new characters."

Monica Hesse of The Washington Post praised the new series but stated that she was reminded of Ghostwriter rather than the 1970s Electric Company. "The original show – low concept, high energy – knew that words didn't have to have literal superpowers in order to be worthwhile and, occasionally, magical."

Marc Peyser of Newsweek wrote "More than lives up to its legacy".

Neil Genzlinger of The New York Times stated that "today's children will certainly find it watchable and will have better language skills after spending time with it. They just aren't likely to still be holding it in their hearts 35 years from now."
