= In Dreams (musical) =

Jukebox musical

- Production artwork
- Music: Various
- Lyrics: Various
- Book: David West Read
- Basis: Songs by Roy Orbison
- Premiere: July 3, 2023: Leeds Playhouse, England
- Productions: 2023 Leeds; 2023 Toronto

In Dreams is a jukebox musical with a book by David West Read and featuring the songs of Roy Orbison. The musical uses the songs of Orbison to tell a modern-day story about Kenna, the former lead singer of a country rock band, who reconnects with her old friends at a family-run Mexican restaurant.

== Premise ==
The musical revolves around Kenna, the former lead singer of a country-rock band. At a critical moment in her life, she decides to throw a party at a family-run Mexican restaurant where she reconnects with some of her old friends, including a drummer named Ramsey. The musical explores themes of love, loss, friendship and the power of music to bring people together.

== Development ==
Following the success of & Juliet, Read was approached with the idea of writing another musical, this time using the songs of Roy Orbison. Rather than tell the story of Orbison's life, Read opted to tell a fictional story using songs by Orbison, including some from his time as part of the Traveling Wilburys. Read commented that he "didn’t want to see someone doing their best Roy Orbison impression". Instead, he wanted to take advantage of Orbison's emotionally complex songs to tell a story, in a similar style to jukebox musicals like Girl from the North Country and Mamma Mia!. The musical has the backing and support of Orbison's sons.

== Production history ==
=== World premiere: Leeds and Toronto (2023) ===
In November 2022, it was announced that In Dreams would have its world premiere at the Leeds Playhouse. The musical premiered on 3 July 2023, and closed on 5 August 2023. It starred Lena Hall as Kenna and Oliver Tompsett as Ramsey. It was directed by Luke Sheppard, with choreography by Fabian Aloise.

In Dreams, along with most of the cast, transferred to Toronto, It had its North American premiere at the CAA Ed Mirvish Theatre, where it opened on 26 September 2023 and closed on 12 November 2023.

== Cast and characters ==
Role	Leeds	Toronto
Role	2023	
Kenna	Lena Hall	Lena Hall
Ramsey	Oliver Tompsett	Oliver Tompsett
Jane	Sian Reese-Williams	Sian Reese-Williams
Donovan	Noel Sullivan	Noel Sullivan
Oscar	Manuel Pacific	Manuel Pacific
Nicole	Gabriela García	Nasim Ramirez
Ana Sofia	Alma Cuervo	Alma Cuervo
George	Richard Trinder	Richard Trinder
Tom	Leon Craig	Leon Craig

== Musical numbers ==
Act I

- "Dream Baby" / "In the Real World" – Kenna
- "End of the Line" – Oscar, Nicole, and Company
- "You Got It" – Nicole, Oscar, Kenna, and Company
- "Communication Breakdown" – Kenna, Donovan, Jane, Ramsey
- "I Drove All Night" – Ramsey
- "Running Scared" – Kenna
- "He's a Mystery to Me" – Nicole
- "Blue Bayou" / "Only the Lonely" – Ana Sofia and George
- "Margarita" – Kenna and Company
- "A Love So Beautiful" – Jane and Donovan
- "Handle with Care" – Kenna, Jane, Donovan, Ramsey, and Company
- "Not Alone Any More" / "In the Real World (reprise)" – Ramsey and Kenna
- "Crying" – Kenna

Act II

- "Heartbreak Radio" – Tom and Company
- "Oh, Pretty Woman" – George and Company
- "It's Over" – Kenna
- "Mean Woman Blues" – Donovan and Jane
- "Love Hurts" – Kenna
- "In Dreams" / "Llorando (Crying reprise)" – Oscar and Nicole
- "Wild Hearts Run Out of Time" – Ramsey
- "You Got It (reprise)" – Kenna, Tom, Jane, Donovan, Oscar, and Company
