= List of The Electric Company (2009 TV series) episodes =

This is a list of episodes of the 2009 television series The Electric Company.

== Series overview ==
Season	Episodes	Originally released	
Season	Episodes	First released	Last released
1	28	January 23, 2009	October 1, 2009
2	12	January 18, 2010	May 7, 2010
3	12	February 7, 2011	April 4, 2011

== Episodes ==
=== Season 1 (2009) ===
No. overall	No. in season	Title	Original release date
1	1	"Skills"	January 23, 2009 (Note: These episodes originally aired 1/19/2009 as part of an introductory marathon and again for the start of the weekdays.)
Keith discovers he has the wordball power and is invited to become a member of the Electric Company. Francine Carruthers, the leader of the neighborhood troublemakers called the Pranksters, steals Keith's ability. Keith comes up with a brilliant plan to retrieve his skill; the ability to draw in the air. (When this episode as part of The Electric Company Experiment, the cutscenes of Keith talking to the kid at the basketball court were removed and replaced with Hector explaining the concept of the series.); Guest Starring: Kyle Massey, Lin-Manuel Miranda Villains: Francine, Manny, Annie, Danny Words: Skill, feature, athlete, visualize, appear
2	2	"Scent of a Human"	January 30, 2009
Hector wins a contest to appear in a hip-hop video. A jealous Annie gets her Uncle Sigmund Scrambler (Mark Linn-Baker) to hypnotize Hector, making him act like a dog. Special Guest Stars: Sean Kingston, Kelly Ripa Guest Starring: Lin-Manuel Miranda Villain: Annie Words: Human, instinct, canine, track, scent
3	3	"Lights, Camera, Beetles!"	February 6, 2009
Hector and Jessica prepare a birthday party for their bug-crazy cousin. The scheming Francine snatches a rhinoceros beetle to appear in a monster video she is making and hopes to rope the Electric Company into appearing in the video with the help of Danny. Special Guest Stars: Ne-Yo, Jimmy Fallon, Common Villains: Francine, Danny Words: Beetle, gigantic, terrarium, insect, examine, characteristic
4	4	"Call Me Tiki"	February 13, 2009
Tiki Barber's pet parrot flies away, and Jessica has to prove her innocence against Manny, who claims he picked it up off the street flocking with some pigeons. Guest Starring: Tiki Barber, Wyclef Jean Villain: Manny Words: Responsible, irresponsible, mimic, squawk, reputation, responsibility
5	5	"Lost and Spaced"	February 20, 2009
The Skeleckians, a race of technologically advanced but socially awkward aliens, are introduced in this episode. Dax, a member of this race, helps Lisa with her science-fair project—a shrinking machine to explore a model of the Solar System. Francine, hoping to win the fair, sabotages the project, shrinking the two and trapping them in the model. They must communicate with the other members of the Electric Company to escape, yet they accidentally get shrunk as well. They need to get out, however, there is nobody outside the model who can work the machine. Villain: Francine Words: Solar system, constellation, enlarge, atmosphere, terrain
6	6	"Trouble Afoot"	February 27, 2009
After Manny challenges Hector to a one-on-one game of basketball, he switches Hector's sneakers with a pair that destroys the coordination of the wearer. As Hector flails around the city, the others try to discover the password that can remove the sneakers, based on clues in Manny's badly rhymed video messages. Special Guest Star: Whoopi Goldberg Villain: Manny Words: Coordinated, challenge, agility, victory, function
7	7	"The Skeleckian Hiccups"	March 6, 2009
Jessica and Danny compete in a chess tournament. Unfortunately, Jessica comes down with a case of the Skeleckian Hiccups. This ailment makes her speak her private thoughts out loud, which makes her unable to stop announcing her chess moves. She has a choice: lose the tournament, or eat two disgusting leaves daily for a week. Special Guest Appearance by: June Angela Villain: Danny Words: Reveal, remedy, diagnosis, herbal, private
8	8	"Dirty Laundry"	March 13, 2009
A Skeleckian named Todd, Keith, and Lisa are waiting for a meteorite to fall, but Manny steals it and uses it to power his new gadget that deletes letters and allows him to create wordballs. Guest Starring: Mario Jacob Knoll as Todd Villain: Manny Words: Meteorite, conduct, predict, electricity, astonishing, invention
9	9	"He's Not Frozen, He's Immobile"	March 20, 2009
Manny and Annie accidentally freeze Keith permanently after fighting over a freeze remote that Manny made, when trying to freeze Annie's sister, Amy, whom Annie has to babysit. It's up to the Electric Company to unfreeze Keith before his dad finds out. Guest Starring: Pete Wentz, Andrea Burns as Bebe Spamboni, Emma Kantor as Amy Scrambler, & Sean J. Moran as Sammie Spamboni Villains: Manny, Annie Words: Permanent, temporary, aim, immobile
10	10	"Scrambled Brains"	March 27, 2009
Annie's uncle Sigmund returns and switches Annie's and Lisa's brains by hypnosis, as Annie wants to frame Lisa by causing some trouble. The gang has to work together to stop Annie and switch her and Lisa back to normal. Guest Starring: Mark Linn-Baker Villain: Annie Words: Brain, personality, cure, reverse, theory
11	11	"Abracadabra Ca-Green"	April 3, 2009
During a magic street performance, Hector and Jessica watch a street magician named Calvero transform himself into a snake. Before Marlon, his assistant, can change him back, Danny steals the magician's book and turns Jessica into a lizard. Marlon tries to change her back, but leaves her with green hair and reptile-like Skin. When the Electric Company seeks out Danny, he turns himself into a turtle. They have one hour before they change into reptiles forever. However, the magic book is locked up, and there's only one way to get it out. Special Guest Star: Jack McBrayer Guest Starring: Jason Antoon David Lee Villain: Danny Words: Transform, habitat, lizard, venomous, reptile, harmless
12	12	"Game On"	April 10, 2009
Manny, who has recently crowned himself Game King, notices that Hector is about to win a video game that he himself has not yet conquered. To stop Hector, Manny frees Deek the Dino Dude, and traps him the real world. Manny repeatedly sabotages the Company's efforts to help Deek and eventually challenges them to one final game for his freedom. Guest Starring: Mike McGowan, Kyle Massey Villain: Manny Words: Persevere, strategy, perseverance, compete, gadget
13	13	"War of the Words"	April 17, 2009
Hector is chosen to make a presentation about stamina to Jessica's health class. Francine, upset over the fact that she wasn't chosen to give the report, notices that Hector's powers fade when he is fatigued. She teams up with Annie and Manny in an effort to keep Hector from resting, thereby turning off his power and ruining the report. Villains: Francine, Manny, Annie Words: Stamina, fatigue, exhausted, nourishment, nutritious
14	14	"Mighty Bright Knight"	April 24, 2009
Jessica and Manny both wait eagerly to get the newest issue of Mighty Bright Knight, a popular comic book. With only one copy left, the owner of the comic-book shop sets up a riddling scavenger hunt, and promises the book to the winner. Manny and Jessica compete with their partners: Jessica and Hector vs. Manny and Annie Scrambler. Guest Starring: John Ellison Conlee Villains: Manny, Annie Words: Individual, opponent, merit, fortunately, unfortunately Note: The sequel to this episode is Mighty Bright Fight; also, this is the first episode without a song during the story portion of the show.
15	15	"The Orangachoke"	May 22, 2009
Lisa's friend Lottie, a Skeleckian, will receive a unique talent if she holds a fruit known as an Orangachoke during a total eclipse of the sun. She invites everyone at the local school to witness the eclipse—but accidentally misspells Danny Rebus's name on the invitation. A furious Danny steals the Orangachoke in retaliation, and the Electric Company must get it back before the eclipse. Guest Starring: Josephine Rose Roberts, David Lee Villain: Danny Words: Artichoke, dubious, panorama, touchy, eclipse Note: After the Electric Company website was remodeled on February 1, 2011 this episode was no longer available on the episode section of the site.
16	16	"Gravity Groove"	May 29, 2009
Lisa and Shock prepare to enter a dance-off. Francine, also a contestant, sabotages Shock with the use of Skeleckian Gravity Spray, increasing the weight of his legs. Hector inspires Lisa not to give up—but Francine manages to spray her as well. How can the two win with such a heavy problem? Guest Starring: Bobby Moynihan Villains: Francine, Manny Words: Timing, pivot, gravity, intimidate
17	17	"The Limerick Slam"	September 7, 2009 (Note: Starting with this episode, the series began running every weekday.)
After Hector lost the Limerick Slam due to a buzzing bug, it's up to Jessica to become the champion in order to defeat reigning champion Manny. Villain: Manny Words: Limerick, structure, distracted, valid, invalid
18	18	"Pop Goes the Easel"	September 8, 2009
Lisa and Danny are thrust into a magical painting by uttering the secret word "pineapple." It's up to their pals to work with the artist, Calvero's brother, to return them to the real world. Villain: Danny Words: Landscape, series, canvas, continuous, easel
19	19	"The Electric Accompany"	September 9, 2009
Annie hypnotises Keith to sing an annoying jingle all day, nonstop. The Electric Company must find a way to put an end to it before Keith has to sing a song he wrote for his dad's birthday. Villain: Annie Words: Compose, accompany, lyrics, advertise, harmony
20	20	"The Wordball is My Oyster"	September 10, 2009
Lisa gets a case of stage fright when she's cast as the lead in Hector's play. Lisa must overcome her fears in time to save the play or give her part to Annie. Villains: Annie, Danny Words: Brilliant, genius, memorize, perform, performance
21	21	"Franscent"	September 14, 2009
A science project competition between Lisa and Francine. Villain: Francine Words: Stem, hybrid, bloom, formula, scent
22	22	"The Flube Whisperer"	September 16, 2009
Keith sends away for a Skeleckian pet that lives in a biosphere. But when the biosphere malfunctions, and the temperature begins to get cold, they go to Manny for help as he is the only one able to fix it. Villain: Manny Words: Thermometer, thermostat, temperature, miniscule, environment
23	23	"Out to Launch"	September 17, 2009
When Francine calls Hector a liar on a neighborhood billboard, the Electric Company has to find a way to clear his name by trying to launch a wordball on the billboard. However, Francine tries as much as she can to keep the wordball from reaching the billboard. Villain: Francine Words: Angle, launch, height, adjust, experiment
24	24	"Fromage Here to Eternity"	September 24, 2009
Annie tries to get a scoop on Lisa, who's been assigned to write about Skeleckian cheese for the school paper. Villains: Manny, Annie Words: Capsule, orbit, monitor, slightly, navigate
25	25	"Friends or Aunts"	September 28, 2009
Lisa and Hector compete against Annie and her Aunt Sandy on a cheesy game show, but Annie plans to make Hector and Lisa lose with the help of Francine. Guest Starring: Ana Gasteyer as Sandy Scrambler, Jason Jones as Bob Bobson Villains: Francine, Annie Words: Selected, knowledge, rules, correct, incorrect
26	26	"A Whole New Francine"	September 29, 2009
Somehow Francine seemingly turns over a new, decidedly nicer leaf and starts being nice to the Electric Company. It's really a plot to become a member of the Electric Company and take it over. Villains: Francine, Manny Words: Volunteer, apologize, convince, dishonest, trust
27	27	"Mighty Bright Fight"	September 30, 2009
Hector becomes suspicious when Jessica is hanging out with Manny and a Skeleckian friend named Harper during the Mighty Bright Knight convention. Hector tries to get to the bottom of it. Villain: Manny Words: Assistant, create, creator, suspicious, decision
28	28	"Oh, Danny Boy"	October 1, 2009
To beat Manny and Francine in a ping-pong tournament (as they're cheating), Hector teams up with Danny. Villains: Francine, Manny, Annie, Danny Words: Partner, sensitive, depend, loyal, commitment

=== Season 2 (2010) ===
No. overall	No. in season	Title	Original release date
29	1	"One Smart Cookie"	January 18, 2010
Keith's cousin, PJ, competes with Francine for the title of Master Detective. Will the Electric Company's help be enough to make PJ the winner? Or will Francine's cheating ways be the winning ways? Guest Starring: Kyle Massey, Ann Harada Villain: Francine Words: Character, details, mystery, clues, and detective Note: This is the first episode where Hector is absent.
30	2	"One Bad Apple"	January 19, 2010
Lisa helps Keith's cousin PJ write a story for his creative writing class. But will he be able to create a western movie that takes place in a refrigerator? Special Guest Star: Monique Coleman Guest Starring: Kyle Massey, Lin-Manuel Miranda Villain: Danny Words: Western, positive, negative, conflict, and confident
31	3	"The Unmuffins"	January 20, 2010
When Jessica comes over for a sleepover at Lisa's, she tells her a scary story about "Unmuffins"--delicious pastries that turn whoever eats one into the opposite, or "Un", version of him or herself. Jessica dreams herself into the world of the story, where she must work with the polite and helpful "Un" Danny and Manny to bring the nasty, dirty "Un" Lisa, Keith, and Shock back to normal. Special Guest Star: Dwight Howard Guest Starring: LL Cool J, John Leguizamo Villains: Lisa, Keith, Shock Words: Unsure, unbelievable, undo, unfriendly, and unusual Note: This vocab segment features "UN" as a prefix
32	4	"Wicked Itch"	January 21, 2010
Lisa, PJ (played by Kyle Massey), Keith and Jessica are making a movie! Will Manny Spamboni (playing the villain) ruin it as he begins to be quite difficult, or will he learn to collaborate with the Electric Company? Special Guest Star: Monique Coleman Guest Starring: Kyle Massey, Sherri Shepard Villain: Manny Words: Wicked, courageous, script, predictable, and collaborate
33	5	"Madame President"	February 12, 2010
Lisa and Francine face off in the election for Book Club President. When they debate, with Samantha Bee as the moderator, can Lisa's campaign message win out over Francine's negative politics? Hector and Keith try to help Lisa win the election and stop Francine's cheating ways. Guest Starring: Samantha Bee as herself Villain: Francine Words: Election, poll, campaign, negative, and debate
34	6	"Goodnight, Robot"	February 26, 2010
Lisa, Hector, Jessica, and Keith try to save the house of J.T. Bookbinder, the author of Goodnight, Robot. Francine's mother is planning to tear it down and build a hotel called The Francine, but the gang try to prove that Francine might like the book. The group must get 1,000 signatures to preserve the house, or else it gets torn down. Villain: Francine Note: In order to preserve J.T.'s house, the Electric Company is hosting a read-in while dressed up as the characters from Goodnight, Robot: Hector as the Robot; Lisa as Sara, the girl in pigtails decorated with red scrunchies and matching pajamas (she carries a teddy bear in her arm); Keith as the Dalmatian; Jessica as the Green Alien; Everybody makes sure there are no fake signatures until Hector begins to read the book. Words: Inspire, signature, petition, verify, and preserve
35	7	"The Great Compromise"	April 2, 2010
After Francine tries to rename 153rd Street to Francine's Way, Mrs. Quiggly (the deputy commissioner of traffic) threatens to ban all use of powers in the neighborhood (Keith and Francine threw word balls constantly bickering because of the name of the street, which distracted Mrs. Quiggly and made her crash her car and had an accident). The only way that their powers can still be used is if the Electric Company and the Pranksters must compromise and work together to make a proposal on how they can still use their powers safely in the neighborhood without causing anymore incidents. Villains: Francine, Manny, Annie, Danny Words: Perturbed, extreme, bicker, proposal, and compromise
36	8	"The Potato Custom"	April 9, 2010
Jessica is named Junior Ambassador to the planet, Skelecki, but she shockingly insults the Skeleckians when Annie sabotaged Jessica's essay by scrambling her words. Will Annie become the Junior Ambassador, or can Jessica fix everything by offering them Potatoes on Sticks to make amends as their traditions demand. Villain: Annie Words: Ambassador, translate, culture, custom, and insult
37	9	"Bananas"	April 16, 2010
Annie's Uncle Sigmund gets tongue-tied every time he tries to talk to his childhood friend Natalie as he has a crush on her. Can the Electric Company help Sigmund tell her how he feels before it's too late? Guest Starring: Kyle Massey, Christopher Massey, LL Cool J Villain: Annie Words: Binoculars, observe, flustered, admit, and discover
38	10	"Bluefoot"	April 23, 2010
Hector and the gang try to debunk the myth of a mysterious creature called Bluefoot while Manny and Francine try to prove it (or it is just a scam to get attention and make Hector look foolish?). But someone is lying about Bluefoot and the Electric Crew will prove it. Villains: Francine, Manny Words: Evidence, expert, microscope, skeptical, and gullible
39	11	"Jules Quest"	April 30, 2010
Jessica discovers an ancient scroll that leads her on a scavenger hunt throughout the neighborhood. Will the scroll lead Jessica to hidden treasure... or an even bigger surprise? Villain: Danny Guest Starring: Aleisha Allen as Jules Words: Scroll, excavate, artifact, quest
40	12	"Revolutionary Doughnuts"	May 7, 2010
Lisa is told by Annie that her ancestor Cordelia was accused of being a traitor in the Revolutionary War (she gave donuts to the Redcoats). Villain: Annie Words: Relative, ancestor, discover, discovery, and traitor

=== Season 3 (2011) ===
No. overall	No. in season	Title	Original release date
41	1	"Off Target"	February 7, 2011
A kid named Marcus Barnes finds out that he has the wordball power…well, kind of. The Electric Company tries to help Marcus improve his wordball-throwing skills so he can join them. Meanwhile, Francine and Gilda Flip —a new resident in Francine's building and Prankster-in-training—ask Manny to build a machine that can help them prevent Marcus from becoming the newest member of the Electric Company. Guest Starring Jenny Slate Villains: Francine, Manny, Gilda
42	2	"A Fistful of Confetti"	February 8, 2011
It's world-record day in the neighborhood, and everyone's in it. Francine and Gilda can make records on their own. Gilda makes several records within two minutes, but Marcus breaks his record and has Francine achieving the longest record of temper tantrums. Guest Starring Alan Cumming Villains: Francine and Gilda
43	3	"Revenge of the Zeros"	February 9, 2011
Upset about their score of zero points in the banana sculpture contest, Danny and Annie decide to ruin Paul the Gorilla's banana festival party that is being held at the Electric Diner. The Electric Company catches on and does everything it can to stop the pranksters, save the party, and preserve Paul's sanity. Villains: Annie and Danny
44	4	"Spooky Summer Soirée"	February 10, 2011
For the yearly Spooky Summer Soirée costume party, the Electric Company decides to dress up as animals dressed as monsters. Jessica and Marcus don't have their costumes yet and, Annie Scrambler, with the help of Gilda, buys all of the costumes at the discount costume store. Marcus and Jessica hit the neighborhood sidewalk sales to find what they need while staying within their budget. Villains: Annie and Gilda
45	5	"Pies for Puppies"	February 14, 2011
It's the Pies for Puppies charity bake sale, and Jessica finds out that her pies are missing, and finds out that Danny Rebus took them, and others are competing to sell the most pies and become the puppy hero. The Electric Company discovers that Danny Rebus is trying to cheat his way to victory with Annie Scrambler's help, and it is up to them to put a stop to it. Villains: Annie and Danny
46	6	"Prankster Holiday"	February 21, 2011
Other than Marcus, the Electric Company leaves town for the 4th of July. Jessica is at a concert, Hector and Shock are rock-climbing and Keith is at the beach. Manny and Danny couldn't be happier—with everyone gone, they can pull the ultimate prank by launching a giant wordball balloon that reads "The Electric Company doesn't like you." Marcus enlists his friend Emily and Paul the Gorilla to help him stop the pranksters and save the Electric Company's reputation. Guest Starring Swizz Beatz Villains: Manny and Danny
47	7	"The Wordball Games"	February 28, 2011
Right before the yearly Wordball Games, known as the Neighborhood Olympics, Hector sprains his ankle. With Hector unable to compete, the Electric Company doesn't have enough players to participate against the four Pranksters! But when Manny also gets hurt, the numbers are even once again. Now the question is, can Marcus handle Hector's event, the Word Obstacle course, or will the Pranksters win this year? Villains: Francine, Manny, Annie, and Danny
48	8	"The Incredible Return-a-Ball"	March 7, 2011
Marcus sees a commercial on his laptop for Francine's latest invention, the Return-a-ball, which is supposed to come right back to you when you throw it. He can't resist buying one but quickly discovers that it doesn't work and it's just a regular ball which is a knockoff. The rest of the Electric Company pitches in to help Marcus prove that Francine faked her commercial so he can get his money back. Villains: Francine and Gilda
49	9	"Wiki Wiki Walter"	March 14, 2011
Hector challenges Manny to find a beatboxer better than Shock, and he panics! After his last beatboxing competition with his best friend Wiki Wiki Walter, their friendship was ruined! When Manny finds a competitor who turns out to be Shock's old beatboxing pal Wiki and, with Doug E. Fresh as the beatboxing judge, the competition gets a little more interesting. Villain: Manny
50	10	"Shrink, Shrank, Shrunk!"	March 21, 2011
Manny borrows the Skeleckian Shrinkanator 3002, an invention with the power to shrink anything down to a very small size. When Marcus and Jessica accidentally get shrunk, the Electric Company has to get the Shrinkinator back from Manny to get them back to normal size! This becomes even more difficult when Manny shrinks himself and is nowhere to be found. Villains: Manny and Danny
51	11	"Tip it or Dip It"	March 28, 2011
Marcus and Manny are this week's contestants on a game show called Tip it or Dip It. Show host Rob Robson, played by comedian Sherrod Small, introduces this week's surprise guest host, and it's Francine! Will Manny's cheating prevent Marcus from winning? Villains: Francine and Manny
52	12	"The Junior Assistant"	April 4, 2011
Francine wants to be on the next season of The Junior Assistant, a reality show run by the Ronald (David Rasche), one of the richest and most famous people in the world. She must collaborate with Hector and the Electric Company to make six hundred cookies by five o'clock in order to prove that she's worthy of being on the show. Villain: Francine
