= Freestyle Love Supreme =

American improvisational hip-hop group

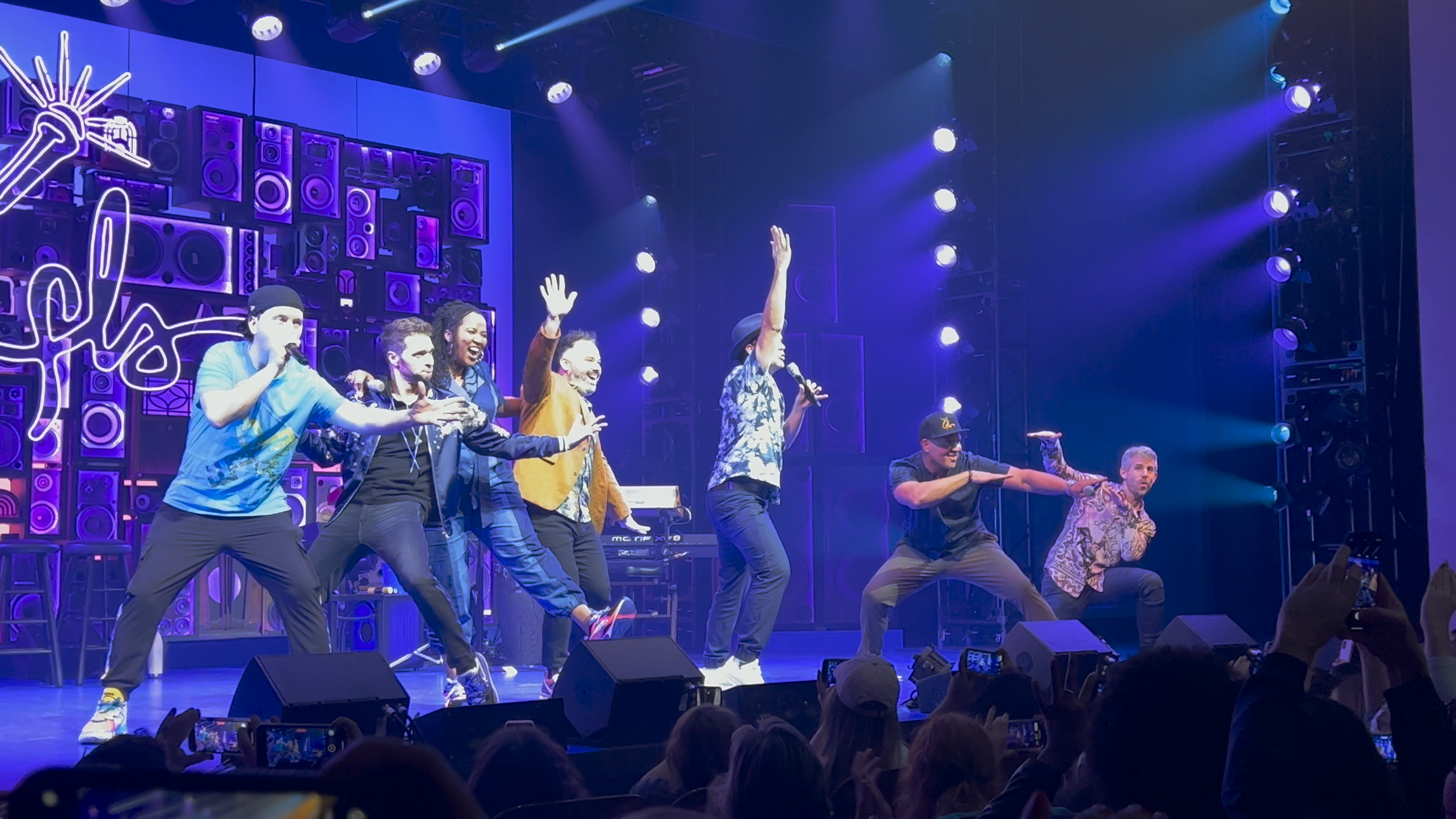
The Freestyle Love Supreme group standing on stage during a curtain call on their Broadway 2021 run.

Freestyle Love Supreme is an improvisational hip-hop (also known as freestyle rap) comedy musical group started by Lin-Manuel Miranda and Anthony Veneziale in 2004 and directed by Thomas Kail. In 2022, the group completed a Broadway musical run at the Booth Theatre.

== History ==
The idea for the project started during rehearsal breaks for Miranda's first Broadway musical, In the Heights. During shows, the performers rap and beatbox, backed by keyboards. Unlike traditional, scripted musicals, the audience is intended to be engaged and participate in the show, providing suggestions and occasionally even being brought on stage. Before being performed on Broadway, there were performances at Ars Nova in 2004, 2006 Melbourne International Comedy Festival, Montreal Just for Laughs Festival and the Edinburgh Festival Fringe in 2005, as well as many other performances including Joe's Pub, Google Zeitgeist, Greenwich House Theater, Mo Pitkin's, and others.

Members of the group appeared in several episodes of the 2009 The Electric Company revival, on which Miranda, Sherman, Jackson, and Sullivan were regular music contributors.

The group created an 11-episode television series that aired on Pivot in 2014. Now available for a fee on Prime video and YouTube

The group performed its Off-Broadway and Broadway shows in 2019–2020 in celebration of their 15th anniversary.

The story of the group and musical is featured in the 2020 documentary We Are Freestyle Love Supreme, directed by Andrew Fried, who began filming the group in 2005. The film contains footage shot over the 15 years of the group's history.

== Cast and crew ==
Cast members have included the following, though other members have appeared, sometimes unannounced. The opening night performance on Broadway featured multiple guest stars.

Vocal performers

The following performers have performed rap or beatboxing on the show:

- Lin-Manuel Miranda a.k.a. Lin-Man
- Anthony Veneziale - a.k.a. Two Touch
- Chris Sullivan - Shockwave
- Utkarsh Ambudkar a.k.a. UTK the INC.
- Christopher Jackson a.k.a. C-Jack
- Kaila Mullady a.k.a. Kaiser Rözé
- Andrew Bancroft a.k.a. Jelly Donut
- Daveed Diggs
- James Monroe Iglehart a.k.a. J-Soul
- Wayne Brady
- Ashley Pérez Flanagan
- Aneesa Folds a.k.a. Young Nees
- Jay C. Ellis a.k.a. Jellis J
- Morgan Reilly a.k.a. Hummingbird
- Dizzy Senze
- Mark Martin a.k.a. Mandible
- Larry Dorsey Jr. a.k.a. 360
- Tarik Davis a.k.a. Tardis Hardaway
- Gable Johnson III a.k.a. Honeycomb
- Manny Houston a.k.a. MannyPacksAWow

Keyboardists

The following keyboardists have accompanied the vocal artists:

- Arthur Lewis a.k.a. Arthur the Geniuses (Sings during "True")
- Bill Sherman a.k.a. King Sherman a.k.a. And Bill
- Ian Weinberger a.k.a. Berger Time
- Kurt Crowley a.k.a. The Lord and Lady Crowley
- Alan Markley
- Richard Baskin Jr. a.k.a. Rich Midway
- James Rushin a.k.a. Shifty Hills
- Simone Acosta a.k.a. Sims
- Victoria Theodore a.k.a. Gigawatts

Crew

- Cody Renard Richard, Production Stage Manager

== Performances ==
Freestyle Love Supreme was performed on Broadway at the Booth Theatre from October 2, 2019, through January 12, 2020.

On October 7, 2021, the group began a three-month limited run back at the Booth Theatre. After four months on Broadway, the show finished the Broadway run on January 2, 2022.

Freestyle Love Supreme announced that they would do a National Tour, with stops in 11 cities. The tour started on January 21, 2022, at the American Conservatory Theater, in San Francisco. The tour concluded at the Pasadena Playhouse, in California on August 7, 2022.

The show arrived at The Venetian Las Vegas Showroom in Las Vegas on November 10, 2022. It closed on January 29, 2023.

Their performances consist of freestyle "games" including: What Y'all Know, On the Fence, True, Day in a Life, Foundations of Freestyle, Pet Peeves, Home, Second Chance, Deep Dive and more.
