= Jenni Barber =

American actress and singer

- Born: Mansfield, Ohio, U.S.
- Education: University of Michigan

Jenni Barber is an American actress and singer best known for her performances on Broadway and on television.

== Early life ==
Barber was born in Mansfield, Ohio. She graduated summa cum laude from the University of Michigan School of Music with a Bachelor of Fine Arts in musical theatre, after receiving the Earl V. Moore award.

== Career ==
=== Television ===
Barber played Lisa Heffenbacher in The Electric Company 2009 TV series, with guest appearances on Law & Order: SVU, Smash, Elementary, Master of None, and Unbreakable Kimmy Schmidt, among other credits.

=== Stage ===
Barber made her Broadway debut as Olive Ostrovsky in The 25th Annual Putnam County Spelling Bee in 2007, after playing the character in San Francisco and Boston productions. In 2008, she appeared in From Up Here at New York City Center; she had a minor role, but The New York Times review called her a scene stealer. In 2010, she played Audrey in As You Like It, in the Brooklyn Academy of Music's Harvey Theatre directed by Sam Mendes.

She starred as Toni Simmons in the 2011 Off-Broadway revival of the play Cactus Flower in the Westside Theatre, receiving reviews comparing her to Goldie Hawn in the 1969 film. In 2012, she played actress Sundown LeMay in The Performers opposite Henry Winkler and Cheyenne Jackson.

In 2013, Barber played stripper Joan opposite Nathan Lane in the award-winning The Nance. The following year, she joined the cast of the Broadway production of Wicked, in the role of Glinda.

In early 2015, she played Sibyl in the romance Private Lives at Hartford Stage, followed by Elizabeth, a Mormon wife, in the Encores! revival of Paint Your Wagon. and Nancy D. in the Encores Off-Center revival off A New Brain starring Jonathan Groff and Ana Gasteyer.

She was in the 2017 Broadway revival of Sunday in the Park with George as Celeste #2/Elaine .
