= The Big Door Prize =

2023 American TV comedy series

- Genre: Comedy
- Created by: David West Read
- Based on: The Big Door Prize by M.O. Walsh
- Starring: Chris O'Dowd; Gabrielle Dennis; Damon Gupton; Josh Segarra; Sammy Fourlas; Djouliet Amara; Ally Maki; Crystal R. Fox; Jim Meskimen
- Composers: Nick Sena; Zachary Dawes
- Countries of origin: United States; South Korea
- Original language: English
- No. of seasons: 2
- No. of episodes: 20

Production
- Executive producers: David West Read; Miky Lee; Hyun Park; David Ellison; Dana Goldberg; Bill Bost; Matt Thunell
- Running time: 29–35 minutes
- Production companies: Vidvad, Inc.; Studio Dragon (CJ ENM); Skydance Television

Original release
- Network: Apple TV+
- Release: March 29, 2023 – June 12, 2024

The Big Door Prize is a comedy television series based on the novel of the same name by M. O. Walsh that premiered on Apple TV+ on March 29, 2023. In April 2023, it was renewed for a second season which premiered on April 24, 2024. In June 2024, the series was canceled after two seasons.

== Premise ==
In the town of Deerfield, life moves at a gentle pace until a mysterious machine appears in the local general store. This enigmatic device, seemingly arriving out of nowhere, promises to reveal each individual's "Life Potential" with just a simple consultation. As word spreads, curiosity and excitement ripple through the community, drawing townsfolk from all walks of life to test their fate.

The machine's predictions, delivered through cryptic messages or vivid imagery, range from specific career paths to more general pronouncements about happiness and fulfillment. This arrival brings profound changes to Deerfield, sparking both hope and chaos. Some residents find new purpose and direction, inspired to pursue dreams they had long abandoned, while others face unsettling revelations about their futures. Relationships are tested, secrets are unveiled, and the very fabric of the town is altered as people grapple with the machine's pronouncements.

== Cast ==
- Chris O'Dowd as Dusty (Note: His whistling is performed by American voice actor Joe Zieja.)
- Gabrielle Dennis as Cass
- Patrick Kerr as Mr. Johnson
- Damon Gupton as Father Reuben
- Josh Segarra as Giorgio
- Christian Adam as Trevor
- Sammy Fourlas as Jacob and Kolton
- Djouliet Amara as Trina
- Aaron Roman Weiner as Beau
- Ally Maki as Hana
- Crystal R. Fox as Izzy
- Jim Meskimen as Cary Hubbard
- Deirdre O'Connell as Eloise Hubbard
- Mary Holland as Nat
- Cocoa Brown as Principal Pat
- Justine Lupe as Alice (Season 2)

== Episodes ==
Season	Episodes	Originally released	
Season	Episodes	First released	Last released
1	10	March 29, 2023	May 17, 2023
2	10	April 24, 2024	June 12, 2024

=== Season 1 (2023) ===
No. overall	No. in season	Title	Directed by	Written by	Original release date
1	1	"Dusty"	Anu Valia	David West Read	March 29, 2023
2	2	"Cass"	Anu Valia	Sarah Walker	March 29, 2023
3	3	"Jacob"	Molly McGlynn	Craig Rowin	March 29, 2023
4	4	"Father Reuben"	Molly McGlynn	Corinne Stikeman	April 5, 2023
5	5	"Trina"	Todd Biermann	Amanda Rosenberg	April 12, 2023
6	6	"Beau"	Todd Biermann	Dian Qi	April 19, 2023
7	7	"Giorgio"	Jenée LaMarque	Craig Rowin	April 26, 2023
8	8	"Izzy"	Jenée LaMarque	Sarah Walker	May 3, 2023
9	9	"Deerfest: Part One"	Declan Lowney	Amanda Rosenberg & Corinne Stikeman	May 10, 2023
10	10	"Deerfest: Part Two"	Declan Lowney	David West Read	May 17, 2023

=== Season 2 (2024) ===
No. overall	No. in season	Title	Directed by	Written by	Original release date
11	1	"The Next Stage"	Steven K. Tsuchida	David West Read	April 24, 2024
12	2	"Visions"	Steven K. Tsuchida	Amanda Rosenberg	April 24, 2024
13	3	"Power & Energy"	Heather Jack	Craig Rowin	April 24, 2024
14	4	"Storytellers"	Heather Jack	Corinne Stikeman	May 1, 2024
15	5	"Night Under the Stars"	Jordan Canning	Sarah Walker	May 8, 2024
16	6	"Back in the Saddle"	Jordan Canning	Olive Lorraine & David West Read	May 15, 2024
17	7	"Rehearsals"	Satya Bhabha	Amanda Rosenberg & Corinne Stikeman	May 22, 2024
18	8	"Our Town"	Satya Bhabha	Craig Rowin	May 29, 2024
19	9	"Un-Selfploration"	Declan Lowney	Sarah Walker	June 5, 2024
20	10	"Deercoming"	Declan Lowney	David West Read	June 12, 2024

== Production ==
It was announced in May 2021 that Apple TV+ had greenlit a ten-episode series based on the book, with David West Read as showrunner. In December, Chris O'Dowd was cast to star, with Gabrielle Dennis, Damon Gupton, Josh Segarra and Sammy Forulas co-starring . In February 2022, Djouliet Amara, Ally Maki and Crystal R. Fox joined the cast. In April 2023, Apple TV+ renewed the series for a second season. On June 28, 2024, Apple TV+ canceled the series after two seasons.

Principal photography for season one took place in December 2021 in Georgia. Scenes for the show were shot in and around the Canton Theatre in Canton, Georgia. Filming for season two began January 23 and wrapped on May 2, 2023 in Atlanta, Georgia.

== Reception ==
For the first season, the review aggregator website Rotten Tomatoes reported a 92% approval rating with an average rating of 7.2/10, based on 37 critic reviews. The website's critics consensus reads, "Turning a high concept into a grounded good time, The Big Door Prize realizes its full potential thanks to a lovable cast of relatable characters." Metacritic, which uses a weighted average, assigned a score of 71 out of 100 based on 15 critics, indicating "generally favorable reviews".

The second season has an 87% approval rating on Rotten Tomatoes, based on 15 critic reviews, with an average rating of 6.4/10. The website's critics consensus reads, "Cozy as a weighted blanket and full of keen insights into its merry band of restless neighbors, The Big Door Prize is well worth creaking open for a second visit."
