= Cody Renard Richard =

American stage manager, producer, and educator

Cody Renard Richard (born May 1, 1988) is an American stage manager, producer, and educator in film and theatre. His career spans theatre, television, and opera including Broadway, Cirque du Soleil, and live televised events like the MTV VMAs and Annie! Live. He is an adjunct professor of stage management at Columbia University.

Cody was born and raised near Houston, Texas. He competed in rodeo events before pursuing a career in theatre. Cody studied theatre at Webster University's Conservatory of Theatre Arts in St. Louis where he graduated with a Bachelor of Fine Arts.

== Career ==
=== Scholarship ===
In response to the cultural and political events of 2020, Cody Renard Richard established the Cody Renard Richard Scholarship to encourage more Black, Asian, Latinx, Indigenous, and other students of color to pursue careers in theatrical management and artistic fields. The scholarship is designed to provide a space for the next generation of BIPOC artists to cultivate their leadership skills in relation to the theatrical industry.

The scholarship is created and managed in collaboration with the Broadway Advocacy Coalition.

== Stage Management Credits ==
=== Broadway ===
==== Production Stage Manager ====
- Freestyle Love Supreme
- Pass Over
- Sweeney Todd
- Parade
- Lempicka
- The Last Five Years

==== Assistant Stage Manager ====
- Dear Evan Hansen
- Hamilton
- If/Then
- After Midnight
- Motown The Musical
- Kinky Boots
- Ghost The Musical
- Lysistrata Jones
- The Lion King
