= The Performers (play) =

2012 play by David West Read

- Playbill cover of 2012 Broadway production
- Written by: David West Read

Premiere
- Date: November 2012
- Place: Longacre Theatre

The Performers is a comedy play written by David West Read and directed by Evan Cabnet. It premiered on Broadway on November 14, 2012.

== Premise ==
The Performers is a romantic comedy set during the Adult Film Awards in Las Vegas. Lee, a tabloid journalist, attends to interview his old friend-turned adult film star Mandrew. Lee's fiancee Sara, who is having doubts over her relationship, seeks advice from Mandrew's wife Peeps. When the night takes an unexpected turn and relationships are threatened, adult film stars Chuck Wood and Sundown step in to lend a hand.

== Production ==
The Performers premiered on Broadway at the Longacre Theatre. Previews began on October 23, 2012 ahead of an official opening night on November 14, 2012. The cast included Cheyenne Jackson, Henry Winkler, Alicia Silverstone, Ari Graynor, Daniel Breaker and Jenni Barber.

After showings were cancelled during previews due to Hurricane Sandy, producers offered "Sandy Special" tickets at discounted prices. However, producers cancelled the play after 24 previews and 6 regular performances, blaming the effects of the hurricane.

The show officially closed on November 18, 2012.

== Cast and characters ==
| Character | Broadway |
|---|---|
| Mandrew | Cheyenne Jackson |
| Chuck Wood | Henry Winkler |
| Lee | Daniel Breaker |
| Peeps | Ari Graynor |
| Sundown | Jenni Barber |
| Sara | Alicia Silverstone |

== Reception ==
The San Francisco Chronicle praised the cast, which "keeps the show giggling" with The Hollywood Reporter praising Jackson's and Graynor's performances. However, The New York Times described it as "going to the planet of second-tier sitcoms." and as "less and less funny as the evening wears on" by The New York Post.
