= MISSPSTAR =

American rapper

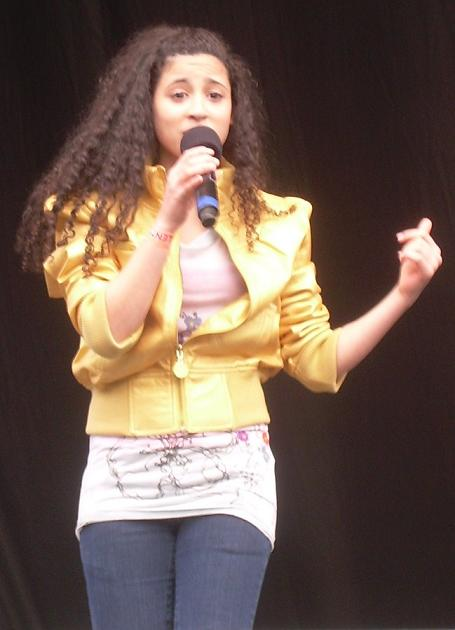
- MISSPSTAR performing in 2009
- Born: Priscilla Star Diaz; June 13, 1994 (age 32); The Bronx, New York City, U.S.
- Occupations: Rapper; singer; actress; dancer
- Years active: 2002–present
- Partner: Jonathan Otero
- Children: 1
- Parents: Jesse Diaz (father); Doris Diaz (mother)
- Relatives: Solsky Diaz (sister); Sinclair Almanzar-Diaz (half-sister; adopted by father)
- Musical career
- Genres: Hip hop; pop; pop rap; reggaeton
- Instrument: Vocals
- Website: misspstar.wixsite.com/misspriscillastar

Priscilla Star Diaz (born June 13, 1994), known professionally as MISSPSTAR and formerly P-Star, is an American rapper, singer, actress and dancer. Diaz is best known for her role as Jessica Ruiz in the 2009 PBS Kids Go revival of The Electric Company and as the focus of the PBS Independent Lens documentary P-Star Rising.

== Early life ==
Diaz was born to parents Jesse Diaz, a former rapper, and Doris Diaz, a heroin addict. Diaz grew up in Harlem with her older sister Solsky. Through her mother, Diaz and her older sister have a younger half-sister named Sinclair who later became adopted by Diaz's father. Diaz was born of paternal Puerto Rican and maternal Cuban descent.

Due to her father serving time in jail, Diaz and Solsky lived in a foster home until their father gained custody of the girls and raised them as a single father in Harlem. At the age of seven, Diaz decided she wanted to become a rapper to make a better life for herself and her family after her father's music career had failed and Diaz and her family found themselves living in a shelter.

== Career ==
Diaz began her rap career at the age of 9 in after hours nightclubs in Harlem, battling against other rappers twice her age. She won the Citywide Hip Hop competition in 2005 and became the youngest female entrant. That same year, Diaz recorded an album with Reggaeton Niños as the main vocalist and appeared in the music video for "Oye mi Canto". She signed a recording contract with independent label Hunc Records in 2007 and released her first album titled Welcome to My Show the same year with the song "Biggie Bounce" released as a single. Diaz directed her music videos for "Don't Stop the Dance" and "Sukoshidake Katamomoi". P-Star released two versions of herself singing in English and Japanese. She appeared in the Off-Broadway production of Take the Train to Maine, 2005's short film Sita and as Jessica Ruiz in the 2009 revival of The Electric Company. Diaz has modeled clothing for Royal Addiction, Baby Phat, J. Lo, and Rocawear. In 2008, Diaz released her exercise DVD "P-Star Workout DVD: Exercise Your Body and Mind, Vol. 1" to help fight childhood obesity. The documentary made about her, P-Star Rising, was featured at the Tribeca Film Festival in 2009. In 2017, P-Star released her comeback single "Don't Sleep On Me" through SoundCloud. Diaz released the single "Broke" under the new stage name 'MISSPSTAR' in 2018 and directed the music video to accompany the single. This was followed by her third single "Left, Right".

== Personal life ==
Diaz was accepted to Denison University in Ohio in 2015, majoring in theater and education. While in attendance at the school, she was a cheerleader and worked as a DJ for the school's radio station. In May 2017, Diaz graduated from Denison University with a BA in Theatre and Education. Diaz started a podcast titled Restless Mother regarding motherhood after the birth of her first child.

== Discography ==
MISSPSTAR discography
- Studio albums: 1
- Soundtrack albums: 1
- Compilation albums: 1
- Singles: 9
- Music videos: 7
- DVDs: 2

=== Albums ===
- Welcome to My Show (2008)

=== Singles ===
- "Biggie Bounce" (2008)
- "Wanna Make You Dance English" (2008)
- "Wanna Make You Dance Spanish" (2008)
- "Don't Stop the Dance" (2011)
- "Sukoshidake Katamomoi" (2011)
- "Don't Sleep On Me" (2017)
- "Broke" (2018)
- "Left, Right" (2018)
- "2276" (2018)
- “I Rather Fail (Than to Surrender)" (2019)

=== As a Featured Artist ===
- "They Won't Play Us" (with Kafir) (as P-Star) (2015)
- “Ego” - (Kash featuring MISSPSTAR) (2019)
- ”Grnd On Me” - (Loco Ninja featuring Kash and MISSPSTAR) (2019)

=== Soundtracks ===
- P-Star Rising (2007)

=== DVDs ===
- P-Star Workout DVD: Exercise Your Body and Mind, Vol. 1 (2008)
- P-Star Rising (2009)

=== Compilation albums ===
- Niños Vol. 1 (Reggaeton Niños), 2006
