= Chris "Shockwave" Sullivan =

American actor

Chris Sullivan
- Born: November 28, 1980 (age 45); Foxborough, Massachusetts
- Other name: "Shockwave"
- Education: University of Massachusetts Amherst
- Occupations: Actor, percussionist
- Website: shockwavebeatbox.com

Chris "Shockwave" Sullivan is an American actor and vocal percussionist. He is best known as being a regular cast member on the American children's PBS Kids GO! show The Electric Company as Shock. His work on the show includes beatboxing. Sullivan was also a producer of the show. He also beatboxed for the Broadway show Freestyle Love Supreme.

== Life ==
Sullivan is from Foxborough, Massachusetts. He was a communications major at the University of Massachusetts Amherst. He was also an AmeriCorps volunteer in Boston.
