= Gabrielle Dennis =

American actress and comedian

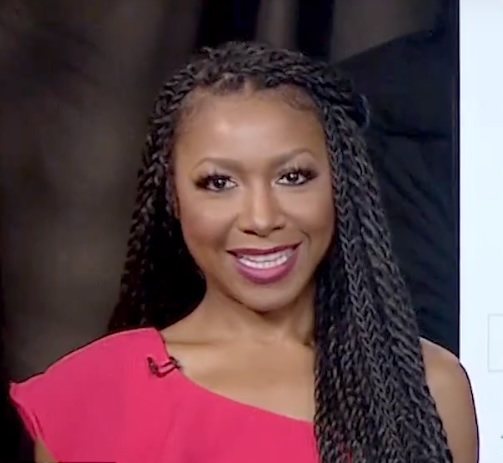
- Dennis in 2018
- Born: Cincinnati, Ohio, U.S.
- Education: Howard University
- Occupations: Actress, comedian, singer, television host
- Years active: 1990–present

Gabrielle Dennis is an American actress and comedian best known for recurring role as Janay Brice on The CW/BET comedy-drama series The Game, and for starring in the sketch comedy HBO show A Black Lady Sketch Show.

== Early life and education ==
Dennis was born and raised in Cincinnati. She began studying dance at the age of four. She attended the School for Creative and Performing Arts in Cincinnati, and by the fifth grade she got her first acting gigs.

Dennis attended Howard University, majoring in communications with a minor in theatre. After graduation, she took a job as a news station camera operator.

== Career ==
Dennis has a background in dance, theatre, stand-up comedy, and singing.

In 2008, Dennis won the role of Janay Brice on The CW comedy series The Game. After the show was canceled, fans campaigned for its return where Dennis was able to reprise her role for two more seasons on BET. During her stint on The Game she landed roles in the direct-to-DVD film Bring It On: Fight to the Finish, and The Marc Pease Experience. She played Denise Roy on Spike's Blue Mountain State.

Dennis has since guest-starred on several series including Franklin & Bash, Bones, Justified, and Baby Daddy. In 2015, she landed the role of Pippy Rosewood, the toxicology expert and lesbian sister of Beaumont Rosewood (Chestnut) for Fox's Rosewood.

Dennis was in a recurring role as Candace on the hit show Insecure.

Dennis is in a recurring role as Tasha on the Netflix series The Upshaws.

Dennis played Whitney Houston in the BET miniseries, The Bobby Brown Story, which debuted in the United States and internationally in September 2018.

In 2018, she began starring as Tilda Johnson in the Marvel Comics-based series Luke Cage (2018).

She has also appeared in Old Spice commercials with comedian/actor Deon Cole.

In 2023, Dennis began playing the leading role of Cass in the Apple TV+ series The Big Door Prize.

== Filmography ==
=== Film ===
Year	Title	Role	Notes
1990	A Mom for Christmas	Christmas Box	TV movie
2004	He Can Get It	Kyra	Video
2005	The Wickeds	Kate	Video
2006	Let's Talk	Khalil's Wife	Short
2008	Drifter	Miranda	
2008	Learning How to Speak	Student	Short
2008	After School	Robert's Wife	
2009	Timer	Girlfriend	
2009	Slinging Mud	Guidance Counselor	Short
2009	Bring It On: Fight to the Finish	Treyvonetta	Video
2009	The Marc Pease Experience	Tracey	
2009	Janky Promoters	Female Fan	
2011	Holly's Holiday	Deena	TV movie
2011	Politics of Love	Chelsea	
2011	He's Mine Not Yours	Brooke	
2012	Back Then	Bobby Jo	
2013	Reporting Live	Guidance Counselor	
2013	What Would You Do for Love	Paula	TV movie
2014	Black Coffee	Morgan	
2014	The Fright Night Files	Serena	TV movie
2014	A Super Secret	-	Short
2015	My First Love	Carmen	Video; also executive producer
2015	Call Me King	Leena	
2017	Girls Trip	Herself	
2022	A Madea Homecoming	Laura	
2022	Wendell & Wild	Wilma Elliot (voice)	
2025	One of Them Days	Shayla	

=== Television ===
Year	Title	Role	Notes
1998–2000	Teen Summit	Herself/Host	Main Host
2004	The New Detectives	Girlfriend	Episode: "Vanished"
2005	Minding the Store	Herself	Episode: "Hot Girls of Comedy"
2005	Ballin	Herself/Host	Main Host
2006	The Underground	Herself/Cast Member	Main Cast
2007	Campus Ladies	Lena	Episode: "Barri & Joan Rush a Black Sorority"
2008	Penn & Teller: Bullshit!	Mock Trainer's Assistant	Episode: "Sensitivity Training"
2008	Wizards of Waverly Place	Candace	Episode: "Quinceanera"
2008	My Name Is Earl	Sassy Black	Episode: "We've Got Spirit"
2008–12	The Game	Janay Brice	Recurring Cast: Season 2–5
2009	Penn & Teller: Bullshit!	Herself	Episode: "Lie Detectors"
2010	Southland	Michelle Hill	Episode: "The Runner"
2010	Blue Mountain State	Denise Roy	Main Cast: Season 1
2012	Franklin & Bash	Nicole Toomin	Episode: "Summer Girls"
2014	Justified	Gloria	Recurring Cast: Season 5
2014	Baby Daddy	Valerie Banks	Episode: "Curious Georgie"
2015	Bones	Alana Jackson	Episode: "The Psychic in the Soup"
2015–16	Born Again Virgin	Kelly/Bryn	Episode: "Pilot" & "Call a Spade a Spade"
2015–17	Rosewood	Pippy Rosewood	Main Cast
2017	Tia Mowry at Home	Herself	Episode: "Booze and Bites"
2017	Face Value	Herself/Team Captain	Episode: "Justin Hires Vs. Gabrielle Dennis"
2017	Lady Dynamite	Jessica Hu	Episode: "Souplutions"
2017–18	Insecure	Candice Peña	Recurring Cast: Season 2, Guest: Season 3
2018	Luke Cage	Tilda Johnson	Main Cast: Season 2
2018	The Bobby Brown Story	Whitney Houston	Episode: "Part I & II"
2018	Hell's Kitchen	Herself/Restaurant Patron	Episode: "Families Come to Hell"
2018–19	S.W.A.T.	Briana Harrelson	Recurring Cast: Season 1 & 3, Guest: Season 2
2019	Rel	Shannon	Episode: "Cleveland"
2019	American Soul	Tina Turner	Episode: "Proceed with Caution"
2019–23	A Black Lady Sketch Show	Herself/Cast Member	Main Cast
2021–26	The Upshaws	Tasha Lewis	Recurring Cast: Season 1-3, Guest: Season 4-5
2022	All American	Lareesha	Episode: "Turn Down for What"
2023–2024	The Big Door Prize	Cass	Main Cast; 20 episodes
2026	Nemesis	Dr. Candice Stiles	Main Cast
