= David West Read =

Canadian playwright and screenwriter

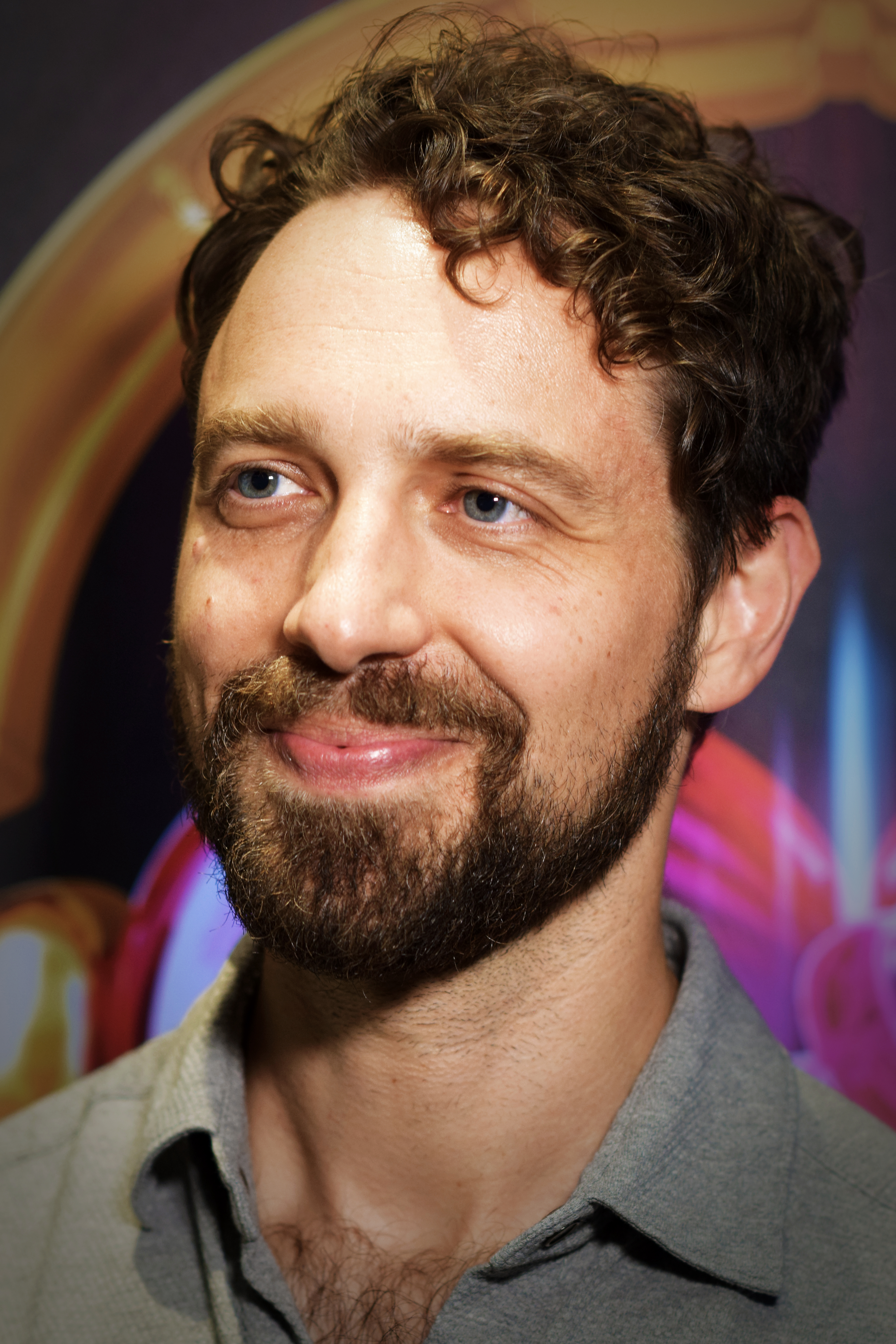
- Read in October 2022
- Born: 1983 (age 42–43); Scarborough, Ontario, Canada
- Education: University of Toronto (BA); New York University (MFA); Juilliard School (GrDip)
- Years active: 2011 - present

David West Read is a Canadian television writer, playwright, actor and producer. He is known for his work as a writer and executive producer on the television series Schitt's Creek, for which he won an Emmy Award. He is also known for writing the multiple award-winning musical & Juliet.

== Early life and education ==
Read was born in 1983 in Scarborough, Ontario, and grew up in Markham. His mother and father, an educational book publisher, both hold Master’s degrees in English. Read also has a sister, who studied drama at the University of Guelph.

Read attended Markham District High School. He graduated from the University of Toronto in 2006, where he studied English literature and semiotics at Victoria College. After graduation, he briefly explored becoming an actor and appeared in a Rogers phone commercial and small roles in television movies. Read received a full scholarship to New York University's Tisch School of the Arts, where he graduated in 2010 with a Master of Fine Arts in dramatic writing. He is also a graduate of the Lila Acheson Wallace American Playwrights Program at Juilliard School.

== Career ==
=== Theatre ===
While studying at New York University, Read began writing a play entitled The Dream of the Burning Boy during one of his playwriting courses. His professor passed along the script to his manager and agent. From there, the play was first performed in 2011 at the Roundabout Theatre Company's Black Box Theatre, an off-Broadway theatre in New York City. The play, which deals with themes of grief and loss, follows the aftermath of the death of a high school student named Dane, and how his death affects the people in his life, including his family, friends, and teachers. The play premiered on February 25, 2011 for a limited engagement, and closed on May 15, 2011.

In 2012, Read wrote his second play, The Performers. The play premiered on Broadway at the Longacre Theatre on October 23, 2012, in previews, ahead of an official opening night on November 14, 2012. It marked the first time since 1984 that a Canadian playwright opened a show on Broadway that was not a musical. The play, which starred Henry Winkler and Alicia Silverstone, is a comedic exploration of the adult film industry and its effect on personal relationships. Despite strong initial attendance at preview performances, the play closed on November 18, 2012, after only four performances. Producers cited the effect of Hurricane Sandy and lukewarm reviews for the play's early closure.

In 2016, Read was approached with the concept of writing a musical using songs written by Max Martin. This led to him writing the book for a musical that rewrites the tragic ending to Shakespeare's Romeo and Juliet. The musical, & Juliet, had its world premiere at the Manchester Opera House in September 2019 before opening at the Shaftesbury Theatre on the West End in November 2019. In 2022, the musical had its North American premiere at the Princess of Wales Theatre in Toronto. The musical then transferred to Broadway, where it began playing at the Stephen Sondheim Theatre in October 2022. He was nominated for Best Book of a Musical at the 76th Tony Awards.

In 2022, it was announced that Read was writing In Dreams, a jukebox musical featuring the songs of Roy Orbison. The musical premiered at England's Leeds Playhouse in July 2023. It then transferred to the Ed Mirvish Theatre in Toronto, where it opened on September 26, 2023 and closed on November 12, 2023.

=== Television ===
In 2015, Read was hired as a writer on the Canadian sitcom Schitt's Creek, after impressing series co-creator Dan Levy in a meeting. He was nominated for a Canadian Screen Award for his writing on the season 5 episode, "Love Letters". For seasons 5 and 6, Read was promoted to executive producer of Schitt's Creek. At the 2020 Emmy Awards, he won an Emmy Award for Outstanding Comedy Series, and was nominated for Outstanding Writing for a Comedy Series for his writing on the season 6 episode, "The Presidential Suite".

He adapted The Big Door Prize, based on the M.O. Walsh novel, into a television series. The first season premiered on Apple TV+ in March 2023, and was renewed for a second season the next month.

In 2023, Apple TV announced that Read was creating a comedy television series that would star Matthew McConaughey and Woody Harrelson. Brothers premiered in September 2026.

== Theater ==
=== Musicals ===
- & Juliet (2019)
- In Dreams (2023)

=== Full-length plays ===
- The Dream of the Burning Boy (2011)
- The Performers (2012)

=== Other works ===
- Afterlove (2015) - short play

== Filmography ==
Year	Title	Actor	Writer	Executive producer	Creator	Notes
2007	A Good Turn	Yes	No	No	No	Role: "Young Man"; Short film
2008	Of Murder and Memory	Yes	No	No	No	Role: "Bobby Gordon"; Television movie
2015–2020	Schitt's Creek	No	Yes	Yes	No	Wrote 17 episodes
2023–2024	The Big Door Prize	No	Yes	Yes	Yes	Wrote 5 episodes
2026	All That She Wants	No	Yes	Yes	Yes	
2026	Brothers	No	Yes	Yes	Yes	Wrote 2 episodes

== Awards and nominations ==
Year	Award	Category	Work	Result	Ref.
2011	Outer Critics Circle Award	John Gassner Award	The Dream of the Burning Boy	Nominated	
2020	Primetime Emmy Awards	Outstanding Comedy Series	Schitt's Creek	Won	
2020	Primetime Emmy Awards	Outstanding Writing for a Comedy Series	Schitt's Creek - "The Presidential Suite"	Nominated	
2021	Golden Globe Award	Best Television Series – Musical or Comedy	Schitt's Creek	Won	
2023	Tony Award	Best Book of a Musical	& Juliet	Nominated	
2023	Drama Desk Award	Outstanding Book of a Musical	& Juliet	Nominated	
2023	Outer Critics Circle Award	Outstanding Book of a Musical	& Juliet	Nominated	
2023	Drama League Awards	Outstanding Production of a Musical	& Juliet	Nominated	
