= List of Wynonna Earp episodes =

Wynonna Earp is a supernatural Western horror television series developed by Emily Andras that airs on Syfy and CTV Sci-Fi Channel (formerly known as Space). The series follows Wynonna Earp, the great-great-granddaughter of legendary lawman Wyatt Earp, and is based on the comic book series by Beau Smith.

The series premiered in the United States on Syfy on April 1, 2016 at 10 p.m., and on CHCH-DT in Canada on April 4, 2016 at 9 p.m. (Note: Wynonna Earp was originally scheduled to premiere in Canada first, on March 28, 2016.) It was renewed for a second season on July 23, 2016. In March 2017, Bell Media announced the new partnership between Space and SEVEN24 Films as Canadian co-producers of Wynonna Earp, with the series moving from CHCH to Space. Season 2 premiered simultaneously on Syfy and Space on June 9, 2017, at 10 p.m. Wynonna Earp was renewed for a third season by Space and Syfy on July 22, 2017. Season 3 premiered on Syfy and Space on July 20, 2018, with the broadcast time changed to 9 p.m. On July 21, 2018, Syfy and Space announced the renewal for a fourth season. In September 2019, Space became the CTV Sci-Fi Channel. Season 4 premiered on Syfy and CTV Sci-Fi Channel on July 26, 2020 at 10 p.m.

In the United Kingdom, Wynonna Earp premiered on Spike on July 29, 2016. It premiered in Australia on Spike on February 5, 2017. Total episode running time is 43 minutes (including opening title sequence and closing credits roll). The titles of episodes are based on country and western songs.

== Series overview ==
Season	Episodes		Originally released	
Season	Episodes		First released	Last released
1	13		April 1, 2016	June 24, 2016
2	12		June 9, 2017	August 25, 2017
3	12		July 16, 2018	September 28, 2018
4	12	6	July 26, 2020	August 30, 2020
4	12	6	March 5, 2021	April 9, 2021

== Episodes ==
=== Season 1 (2016) ===
No. overall	No. in season	Title	Directed by	Written by	Original release date	U.S. viewers (millions)
1	1	"Purgatory"	Paolo Barzman	Emily Andras	April 1, 2016 (USA); April 4, 2016 (Canada)	0.80
Wyatt Earp's great-great-granddaughter, Wynonna Earp, returns to Purgatory to attend her uncle's funeral. Her trip home begins with a missing passenger and a scream in the night. Despite her Aunt Gus' warning, Wynonna investigates her uncle's death and is reunited with her younger sister, Waverly, in the process. Waverly reminds Wynonna (who was institutionalized as a child for insisting demons exist) of the family curse which she has been researching: Wyatt Earp killed 77 outlaws with his gun; now those outlaws are resurrecting as Revenants and they are coming for the Earps. The older sister Willa was destined to inherit Wyatt's abilities and gun but after she is kidnapped, Wynonna becomes the heir. Wynonna is recruited by Black Badge Agent Xavier Dolls to use Wyatt's gun "Peacemaker" to send the Revenants of his kills back to Hell. Doc Holliday climbs out of his prison after Wynonna unknowingly saves him, and introduces himself to her as Henry. Waverly is kidnapped by a group of Revenants, but Wynonna uses Peacemaker to rescue Waverly and send the Revenants back to Hell.
2	2	"Keep the Home Fires Burning"	Ron Murphy	Emily Andras	April 8, 2016 (USA); April 11, 2016 (Canada)	0.65
Wynonna is welcomed to the Black Badge Division and sent on her first solo assignment. Her target is a Revenant named Red, but without Peacemaker all the other weapons are barely effective. After he escapes, the Revenants debate whether she actually has Peacemaker. Wynonna later puts Red down while Bobo, leader of the Revenants, decides to hire Killer Miller, a dark shadow assassin Revenant, to go after her. Waverly meets the new Sheriff Deputy Nicole Haught who flirts with her. Dolls commandeers offices at the Purgatory's Sheriff office much to the displeasure of Sheriff Nedley. At 178 years old, Doc Holliday fears that it will not be long until the Earps figure out what he did to Wyatt Earp. Doc, posing as Henry Holliday, summons Killer Miller, to appease Bobo. Wynonna and Waverly hunt down a talisman that can protect the homestead from Revenants as Killer Miller arrives. Wynonna defeats him and sends another Revenant, Levi, back with a message for Bobo. Bobo orders Doc to drag Levi beyond the Ghost River Triangle line, which a Revenant cannot cross without starting to painfully decay. Bobo promises to Doc to give him the person who made him immortal.
3	3	"Leavin' on Your Mind"	Ron Murphy	Brendon Yorke	April 15, 2016 (USA); April 18, 2016 (Canada)	0.64
Three revenants execute a long awaited plan to escape the Ghost River Triangle. Bobo continues to try to manipulate Doc, but Doc refuses to do anything else for Bobo. Bobo says that to get the name that Doc wants, he will have to get close to Wynonna. The three Revenants hold up a local hardware store. Wynonna turns herself over to the hostage takers in return for the release of all of the hostages. The revenants only release a woman hostage. One of the hostages is Waverly's pretty and dumb boyfriend, Champ. After they kill each other, the final revenant tells Wynonna the materials they killed for were a ritual for the Stone Witch to possess a human body to leave the Ghost River Triangle. The final revenant possesses Shorty, a local beloved bartender, who was wounded but saves Wynonna and then begs her to kill him. Doc formally introduces himself to Wynonna as Doc Holliday.
4	4	"The Blade"	Paolo Barzman	James Hurst	April 22, 2016 (USA); April 25, 2016 (Canada)	0.57
Doc tells Wynonna that Wyatt asked him to ride to Purgatory with him to kill a corrupt lawman but was unable to go because he was dying. Wynonna doubts Doc until he shows his prowess with a gun. A revenant begins killing people while moving through a mirror and demanding his victims beg for forgiveness. Waverly's research initially points them to a minister who murdered women. Doc points Wynonna to Bobo’s encampment but warns her she’ll be outgunned if she tries anything. Wynonna and Dolls find minister but he’s crippled. As they continue to investigate Wynonna is called to the home of a woman who framed Wynonna as drug dealer. Wynonna, unable to honestly forgive the woman, is now the revenant's new target. Waverly interrogates Doc and finds the right revenant. Confronting the revenant Wynonna states her worst sins were killing their father, allowing Willa to be taken, and becoming the heir instead of Waverly who insists she already forgave Wynonna. With Doc's help, Wynonna kills the revenant. In a flashback Doc remembers Wyatt's anger and hatred on finding Doc made a deal for immortality.
5	5	"Diggin' Up Bones"	Paolo Barzman	Shelley Scarrow	April 29, 2016 (USA); May 2, 2016 (Canada)	0.64
Wynonna has a nightmare about Willa’s death and swears to Waverly to get revenge. Dolls and Wynonna meet with Judge Cryderman to get a search warrant on Bobo's trailer park. Wynonna and Dolls raid the trailer park but find nothing. Waverly sneaks into Bobo’s interrogation and tells him she knows Bobo was the one who ordered the attack that killed her father and Willa. Bobo is then released by his attorney, Miss Stone. Wynonna is abducted by a revenant who offers to give her a picture of the seven revenants who killed her father and Willa. After they are found by Doc and Waverly, the revenant who Doc calls Fish, admits he just wants to find his lover, Levi. Miss Stone is revealed to be the Stone Witch who demands Bobo find the bones of her dead children. Doc and Wynonna reunite Levi and Fish. Doc tells Wynonna he's only there to kill the Stone Witch whose real name is Constance Clootie. After an argument about morality Wynonna and Doc have sex. Dolls develops the picture he received from Fish and wonders where he saw it before. It’s revealed the picture is also in Cryderman’s office.
6	6	"Constant Cravings"	Brett Sullivan	Alexandra Zarowny	May 6, 2016 (USA); May 9, 2016 (Canada)	0.55
Waverly and Wynonna review the picture of The Seven and realize Wynonna has already killed five. Waverly notices a brand on one and fearfully suggests only The Blacksmith can help them. Dolls and Wynonna visit The Blacksmith, a witch, who gives them a lead and implies Dolls is more than what he seems. Champ delivers Waverly and Wynonna’s inheritance from their uncle and continues to unknowingly insult Waverly. Waverly finds a poem in her uncle’s effects and realizes it’s for her. Doc asks Wynonna for an audience with Dolls where he offers information on Bobo for information on Constance. Wynonna and Dolls use The Blacksmith’s information to track down the Tate family. After Dolls is captured, Wynonna is able to deduce, amongst other things, the daughter helped kill Wynonna's father. Wynonna kills the daughter to save Dolls. Waverly follows her uncle’s clues and discovers a skull hidden in Shorty’s. Waverly breaks up with Champ. After, she visits The Blacksmith who tells Waverly she was destined for greater things. Dolls is revealed to be cut off from Black Badge of a serum he desperately needs. He injects some of the last he has and his eyes change.
7	7	"Walking After Midnight"	Brett Sullivan	Emily Andras & Caitlin D. Fryers	May 13, 2016 (USA); May 16, 2016 (Canada)	0.40
The Blacksmith is attacked by Constance who gets her to reveal Waverly has her son’s skull. Dolls calls Wynonna to inform her he has to leave town on business and is escorted into a black SUV. Waverly tries to prove she’s normal by trying to throw a bachelorette party for a friend. Doc, hiding from Constance on the property, reveals to Waverly the skull she’s protecting isn’t from a human and later joins the party to help Waverly. Wynonna and Nicole drink together where Nicole tells Wynonna about a strange case which Wynonna recognizes as the work of a revenant. Wynonna visits the morgue only to realize the final of The Seven is toying with her. Constance attacks the Earp homestead but after finding her strength, Waverly stands up to her by destroying Constance’s son’s skull. Wynonna arrives at the homestead to find Waverly and Doc defended themselves. Dolls is forced to defend his work to his superior, Agent Lucado. Dolls offers information about Doc Holliday being immortal to save his own life. The next morning Nicole arrives to question the craziness of Purgatory, but Doc finds both her and Wynonna have been kidnapped from Nicole’s car.
8	8	"Two-Faced Jack"	Ron Murphy	James Hurst	May 20, 2016 (USA); May 23, 2016 (Canada)	0.57
Wynonna wakes up and is told by a morgue attendant that she was in an accident, however she quickly realizes the attendant is a killer and likely the final of The Seven revenants. Doc informs Dolls and Waverly the final of The Seven is the Jack of Knives. Sheriff Nedley and Doc find and interrogate Nicole, leading them and Dolls to the revenant Whiskey Jim. He demands they fight to the death for information. Whiskey Jim gives Doc a report that Dolls gave information to Black Badge about Doc. Doc thinks he kills Dolls in the ring and receives the information only to find Dolls had special ops training in how to fake his death. Wynonna tricks the morgue attendant into leading her to Peacemaker and finds he is just a human. The real revenant implies he’s actually Jack the Ripper. Doc and Dolls arrive in time to help Wynonna. Dolls informs Lucado he lied about Holliday, but delivers Whiskey Jim instead and promises to test the physical limits of the revenants while secretly determined to find out who is a mole within Black Badge.
9	9	"Bury Me With My Guns On"	Ron Murphy	Alexandra Zarowny	May 27, 2016 (USA); May 30, 2016 (Canada)	0.39
Wynonna celebrates the death of The Seven but is clearly still in pain. Constance steals the bones of her sons and resurrects them as a single son. Wynonna is suspended after failing a psychoanalysis at Black Badge. A man offers to buy Shorty’s bar from Gus making Wynonna think the man is a revenant, but he turns out to be human. Gus tells Waverly that she’s only selling Shorty’s to ensure Waverly can have a normal life. Constance resurrects a son without all the parts and he returns deformed. Waverly mistakes Nicole's suspicions about the supernatural and admits she might have feelings for her. Constance attempts to leave town but is stopped by Bobo who murders her son. Nedley implies to Dolls he knows the supernatural goings on and is willing to quietly help. Doc and Wynonna track down Constance who says the Earp curse was vengeance and admits she gave Doc immortality. Wynonna and Doc bury Constance up to her neck in salt to ensure Doc would continue to live forever. Waverly finally directly admits she likes Nicole and they kiss. A revenant tells Wynonna that Bobo was behind the purchase of Shorty’s.
10	10	"She Wouldn't Be Gone"	Peter Stebbings	Brendon Yorke	June 3, 2016 (USA); June 6, 2016 (Canada)	0.54
Wynonna and Waverly make a scene at Shorty’s only to covertly plant a bug. A revenant witnesses a woman killed by a wolf and reports to Bobo that Lou has returned which Bobo replies to in anger. Bobo discovers the bug and uses it to tell Dolls that Wynonna is sleeping with Doc. Wynonna gives Doc Constance’s car which confuses him about their relationship and his future in Purgatory. Wynonna tracks Dolls to where he’s holding Whiskey Jim and demands information about Lou, leading her to be captured by a cult in the forest. The cult, run by a man named Yiska, has a woman named Eve who believes she and Wynonna have a connection. Wynonna escapes with a list of women’s names from Eve and Waverly finds they are all murdered runaways. Wynonna returns and finds Yiska is actually Lou and commands a skin-walker to control his cult. After Wynonna is injured by the skin-walker, Eve picks up Peacemaker and is able to use it to kill Lou. Back at the police station, Wynonna shares a disturbing theory about Eve which Gus later confirms. Eve is actually Willa Earp.
11	11	"Landslide"	Peter Stebbings	James Hurst & Ramona Barckert	June 10, 2016 (USA); June 13, 2016 (Canada)	0.52
Dolls confirms that Eve is Willa Earp. Wynonna and Waverly attempt to get Willa to remember her past. Cryderman tries to use Bobo to use two sexually talented revenants to service high rollers for Purgatory’s poker spectacular but they murder a high roller. After shooting Peacemaker, Willa begins to remember Wynonna and the abuse of their father. As Doc attempts to leave town he’s approached by the mysterious Juan Carlo who informs Doc that Wynonna is in danger. If an Earp heir willingly leaves the Ghost River Triangle with a revenant then everyone in Purgatory will die. Doc can either leave town or help Wynonna. Dolls and Wynonna track down Bobo’s sexual revenants and kill them after both state Dolls is very powerful. Willa runs away from Waverly after Waverly tells her about the funeral. Wynonna tracks Willa to Shorty’s where Willa tells her that their father knew the revenants would attack. After this, Willa takes Peacemaker and starts killing revenants in Shorty’s despite Wynonna’s insistence they needed to fly under the radar. Willa calls her a pawn for Dolls and says their family duty is to kill revenants no matter the consequences. Wynonna and Willa reconnect over childhood memories but mercenaries attack the homestead injuring Waverly. Bobo appears suddenly, saving Willa. Wynonna attempts to finally kill Bobo but is pushed out of the way by Willa who says only Bobo knows about her unknown past. Dolls shows Wynonna a picture he found on the mercenaries suggesting he was the target. Cryderman is revealed to be behind the hit attempt much to Bobo’s anger so he demands Cryderman hold a party for him. On his way back to town, Doc’s new car breaks down and he’s abducted.
12	12	"House of Memories"	Paolo Barzman	Alexandra Zarowny	June 17, 2016 (USA); June 20, 2016 (Canada)	0.53
Wynonna and Willa interrogate Whiskey Jim who states he knows nothing about Willa. Willa starts to show serious contempt for Waverly. Bobo is revealed to have ordered a revenant chemist to create a deadly poison. Dolls and Wynonna track Dolls’ assassins to a biker club who admit Cryderman hired them. During the fight Wynonna finds Peacemaker no longer responds to her. Nicole and Waverly make out in the Earp’s barn but Willa finds them and insults Waverly who replies about her own memories that Willa tortured her as a child. Dolls tells Wynonna that he knows Doc has been taken, but reminds her that Doc can take care of himself. Willa finds an origami swan on the edge of the Earp’s land left by Bobo and talks to him until Waverly scares him off with a shotgun. Held in Shorty's basement, Doc tricks Bobo’s chemist into releasing him so he can stop Purgatory from being poisoned. Wynonna and Dolls find Cryderman trying to hang himself and get him to reveal Bobo will do something at a town party he’s hosting that night. Waverly and Willa find where Willa was held and Willa realizes Constance released her. Willa tells Wynonna that their father struck a deal for "The Lead" to end the curse. At Bobo’s party Wynonna realizes that Willa is "The Lead" and only needs to leave Ghost River Triangle with a revenant willingly to end the curse and destroy Purgatory. At the party, Wynonna kisses Dolls only for Doc to return and tell them of the poison. Bobo arrives at the party to tell the party-goers he has poisoned the champagne and will give the antidote to the one person who delivers him Wynonna Earp, dead or alive. Willa, having completely regained her memories, walks away with Bobo hand in hand.
13	13	"I Walk the Line"	Paolo Barzman	Emily Andras	June 24, 2016 (USA); June 27, 2016 (Canada)	0.45
Doc and Dolls make sure Wynonna and Waverly escape from the party, but Waverly is chloroformed and captured. Willa and Bobo declare their love for each and attempt to leave the Ghost River Triangle. However, Willa doesn’t have the Peacemaker, which means Bobo can’t leave. Doc confronts Dolls about his medication. Nicole confronts both of them about the supernatural, when Doc tells her the truth, she accepts it, leading Dolls to deputize her. On the homestead, Willa confronts Wynonna about finding Peacemaker. Wynonna is confused why Willa cares more about Peacemaker than Waverly. A call leads Wynonna and Willa back to the Sheriff’s office. Waverly is revealed to have taken Peacemaker because she doesn’t trust Willa. To get Peacemaker back Willa informs Wynonna of Waverly and Nicole’s relationship and eventually shoots Nicole who turns out to be wearing a bulletproof vest. Wynonna congratulates Waverly on finally dating someone intelligent. When a lynch mob corners Wynonna, Nedley makes a passionate plea to the folks of Purgatory that Wynonna is only what they made her to be and she is their only savior. Doc and Dolls attack the revenants in Shorty’s which fatally injure Dolls. Doc injects Dolls with his medication which turns Dolls into a berserker who destroys the revenant army. Waverly confronts Bobo and learns she may not be an Earp. Wynonna and Doc develop a plan to stop Bobo and Willa from crossing the line of the Ghost River Triangle. Lucado orders Dolls to stand down since Black Badge wants to see what happens when Willa and Bobo cross the barrier, Dolls defies his orders and helps Wynonna. Willa crosses the barrier telling Wynonna she wants revenge against Purgatory. Willa attempts to kill Wynonna with Peacemaker but Peacemaker stops working for her. A black tentacle monster takes Willa, forcing Wynona to cross the barrier to retrieve Peacemaker. Peacemaker glows blue as Wynonna reluctantly kills Willa and Wynonna returns to Purgatory, severing the tentacle attempting to grab her. As Wynonna attempts to mourn Willa, Black Badge takes Bobo and Dolls to a black site. Juan Carlo appears and informs Wynonna that breaking the barrier will have consequences. Wynonna kills Bobo before he can be tortured by Black Badge and swears to retrieve Dolls. Waverly touches black goo from the tentacle and appears to shoot Wynonna.

=== Season 2 (2017) ===
No. overall	No. in season	Title	Directed by	Written by	Original release date	U.S. viewers (millions)
14	1	"Steel Bars and Stone Walls"	Brett Sullivan	Emily Andras	June 9, 2017	0.46
Wynonna Earp kills a demon with the help of Waverly Earp and Doc Holliday. After capturing Dolls, Black Badge Division send a cleaning crew to collect all of Dolls' accessories. Wynonna breaks into a place where Dolls was staying and finds another Black Badge agent (Eliza Shapiro), who was staying with Dolls. Eliza has the same condition as Dolls. The team plans to rescue Dolls from a BBD HQ. Doc saves Dolls. Eliza is shot dead by Richard Moody (a BBD agent). Dolls is on the run from BBD mercenaries. At the BBD HQ, a demon explodes a dynamite and escapes. Waverly shows signs of demon possession.
15	2	"Shed Your Skin"	Brett Sullivan	Alexandra Zarowny	June 16, 2017	0.57
Wynonna thinks Willa's spirit is haunting her. Wynonna and Waverly burn all of Willa's stuff. Agent Lucado is the new head of the Black Badge Division in Purgatory. Wynonna’s rich high-school best friend, Mercedes Gardner, returns to Purgatory, and her workers are being killed by spider-looking demons. Doc finds incriminating files on Agent Lucado, discovering that she hired mercenaries to kill Dolls. Doc demands cash from Lucado in exchange for the files and Doc plans to buy Shorty's Saloon with the cash. Revenant Earl helps Wynonna to locate the nest of the spider demon in Mercedes's building. Wynonna and Waverly destroy the nest. Waverly eats a spider demon under the possession of a demon.
16	3	"Gonna Getcha Good"	Ron Murphy	Brendon Yorke	June 23, 2017	0.50
Four high school friends made a deal with a demon 10 years prior. The demon comes back after 10 years to kill them. Perry Crofte, one of the four friends, tries to save his friends through rituals. The demon makes the victims kill themselves. Doc reveals to Wynonna that he is trying to recreate the drug to save Dolls. Perry explains to the Black Badge Division about the deal with the demon. Wynonna traps the demon inside a trophy from which it appeared and plans to extract the demon's blood to recreate the drug for Dolls. Waverly attacks Tucker Gardner, younger brother of Mercedes Gardner, for trash talking about Officer Nicole Haught, revealing her demon possession to him. Sheriff Nedley gives a confidential file to Nicole. Mercedes is attacked by two demons who look alike. Waverly finds Dolls and Dolls understands that Waverly is possessed by a demon.
17	4	"She Ain't Right"	Ron Murphy	Ramona Barckert	June 30, 2017	0.58
Two demons kill a Black Badge agent to steal a briefcase. Mercedes and her young sister, Beth Gardner, are possessed by two demons who look alike. Agent Lucado wants to retrieve the briefcase from the demons with no backup from Black Badge Division. Waverly goes undercover for Agent Lucado to recover a briefcase associated with Edwin Earp (grandfather of the Earp sisters). Wynonna finds Dolls and takes him to Shorty's, where the drug for Dolls is being recreated by Doc's team. Waverly improvises and sings on stage while undercover. Wynonna finds Waverly but they are both captured. The Earp sisters manage to call Doc. The demons interrogate the Earp sisters about the briefcase and a demon cuts off one of Waverly's arms. Doc's team recreates the drug for Dolls. Doc arrives to help the Earp sisters and the demon inside Waverly grows Waverly's hand back. Doc and the Earp sisters reach Shorty's, followed by demons. Dolls breathes fire and nearly kills the demon. A plate is hidden in the briefcase. The demon inside Waverly leaves her to possess Wynonna.
18	5	"Let's Pretend We're Strangers"	April Mullen	John Callaghan	July 7, 2017	0.50
A group of cultists kills a demon. Wynonna, possessed by a demon, ties Waverly to a chair and leaves with Doc. The plate inside the briefcase has a secret symbol. Wynonna and Doc find the same symbol at a fire station and the fire fighters are the group of cultists. Dolls rescues Waverly. Dolls and Lucado briefly fight. Doc finds that Wynonna is possessed and takes her to the police station. Dolls and Lucado plan to extract a part of the demon inside Wynonna to analyze the demon and to find a way to separate the demon from Wynonna. Dolls cuts Wynonna's finger to extract demon samples and the demon grows the finger back. Lucado touches the detached finger and gets possessed. Lucado cannot bear the possession and her head bursts. Dolls makes a potion to separate Wynonna and the demon. The demon leaves Wynonna and possesses Waverly again. The cult, Wynonna, Dolls, Doc and Nicole find Waverly in the Earp house barn. Wynonna trades the briefcase with the cult to spare Waverly. Wynonna pours the potion into Waverly's mouth and the demon separates from Waverly. Wynonna kills the demon with Peacemaker. Jeremy Chetri informs Dolls that everything relating to Black Badge Division is gone, like it never existed. Wynonna is revealed to be pregnant.
19	6	"Whiskey Lullaby"	April Mullen	Caitlin D. Fryers	July 14, 2017	0.50
One of the twin demons kills and eats a Father inside a Church while searching for the second seal. Dolls and Doc meet with Richard Moody, who informs them that Black Badge Division was never a government agency and it was shut down. Jeremy locates the second seal and marks it on a map. The twin demons coerce another demon to put all of Purgatory to sleep and to take the demon's daughter, Poppy, as hostage. Peacemaker gives a shock to Wynonna to wake her up. Wynonna is now visibly pregnant and it looks like the entire town has been asleep for months. Wynonna wakes up Dolls and they wake up Nicole and Waverly. Waverly leaves to wake up Doc in Shorty's. Doc and Waverly wake up Jeremy and he reveals that the second seal is in Shorty's. The twin demons take the map and diary of Jeremy. Dolls, Nicole and Wynonna locate the demon who put everyone to sleep and learn about the twin demons and that Tucker Gardner is holding Poppy hostage. Nicole and Dolls locate Tucker. Nicole shoots Tucker to rescue Poppy. At Shorty's, Waverly, Doc and Jeremy are frozen by the twin demons. Wynonna arrives at Shorty's and she chases the twin demons away. Wynonna shoots the dream-powered demon with Peacemaker. The twin demons find the severed head of Constance Clootie outside the Gardners' house and they believe that Tucker killed Constance.
20	7	"Everybody Knows"	Paolo Barzman	Brendon Yorke	July 21, 2017	0.40
Dolls and Wynonna search for Tucker Gardner in the Gardners' house but there is no sign of him. Two guys talk about capturing Doc and a wanted poster of Doc can be seen in the background. Mercedes Gardner and Beth Gardner, under the possession of the twin demons, burn the severed head of Constance Clootie. Dolls and Jeremy watch the Gardners' house from a car. Doc is marked with fire for capture and execution by one of the guys talking about capturing Doc earlier. Nicole and Wynonna head to a strip club to find Jonas, who might be the father of Wynonna's child. Jonas is revealed to be a revenant. Waverly helps Wynonna and Nicole to capture the revenant. Jeremy accidentally contains himself, Doc and Dolls together in a spell while making a potion to make them immune from the twin demons' power. The guy who is trying to capture Doc arrives and is revealed to be a ghost. Dolls is the only one who can touch the ghost. A group of ghosts captures Doc, Dolls and Jeremy. Dolls identifies the head of the group and understand that they are all cops. Dolls talks the ghosts out of killing Doc. Wynonna shoots the revenant Jonas with Peacemaker.
21	8	"No Future in the Past"	Paolo Barzman	Emily Andras	July 28, 2017	0.57
One of the twin demons bites Juan Carlo while inquiring about the third seal. Wynonna meets Juan. To find more information on the twin demons, Juan insists that Wynonna go on a vision quest into the past inside a church. (In the vision quest Wynonna comes to know the following information: 1. Constance Clootie helped to capture the twin demons. 2. Bobo was a friend of Wyatt Earp and was innocent. 3. Wyatt shot Bulshar Clootie, Constance Clootie's husband, through Bobo with Peacemaker. 4. Constance explains the Earp curse to Bobo, how he will become a demon, and makes a deal with him to free him from the curse in exchange for her son's bones. 5. Constance created the seals and the third seal is her wedding ring, which is now in the possession of Doc. 6. Bulshar will be released when all three seals are broken.) Rosita (Doc's girlfriend), Waverly and Nicole set up a baby shower for Wynonna. While Wynonna is in the vision quest, Dolls confronts the twin demons outside the church. The twin demons start to eat Juan and Dolls mercy kills him. The twin demons burn the church. Wynonna comes out of the vision quest and reveals all the details to Dolls. Waverly finds a DNA report inside Nicole's bag which reveals that she is not an Earp. Bobo is seen to be awake again.
22	9	"Forever Mine Nevermind"	Ron Murphy	Alexandra Zarowny	August 4, 2017	0.53
Dolls oversees as Wynonna trains Waverly in fighting to stand a chance against the twin demons. A body is found in a burnt state which is believed to be Tucker Gardner. Doc buys a painting from a shop, unbeknownst to him that a demon killed the original shop keeper and replaced him. Wynonna and Doc have dinner at the Earp house, where a mysterious doll can be seen. Waverly and Nicole argue, which leads to Waverly going to a spa with Rosita and kissing her. In the spa, Tucker attacks Rosita, and reveals to Waverly that he faked his own death, the twin demons stole the identity of his sisters and one of his sisters is dead. Rosita knocks Tucker unconscious and reveals to Waverly that she is a revenant. Dolls fights demon-possessed Mercedes Gardner briefly and she escapes. The mysterious doll is actually a demon and after Wynonna shoots it with Peacemaker, the painting which Doc brought burns. Doc gives Constance Clootie's ring to Wynonna. Demon Beth Gardner eats Tucker while he is still alive. Demon Mercedes visits Nicole.
23	10	"I See a Darkness"	Ron Murphy	John Callaghan	August 11, 2017	0.47
Mercedes attacks and bites Nicole. Waverly helps Nicole to fight off one of the twin demons. The cult burns Juan Carlo's body and they give Dolls the briefcase, considering it as a weapon. Beth agrees to give Waverly the anti-venom for Nicole's bite in exchange for the third seal. Nicole's wife, who is a doctor, returns to check on Nicole. Wynonna makes Rosita a test subject to find the anti-venom, as she is a revenant. Mercedes kidnaps Sheriff Nedley to ask him about the third seal. Dolls volunteers to be a test subject to give Rosita time to recover. Waverly asks help from Gretta Perley (twin sister of Mattie Perley, the Blacksmith), an Iron Witch. The Iron Witch agrees to help Waverly in exchange for the trophy within which a demon was captured by Wynonna. Waverly makes a deal with the Iron Witch and the Iron Witch helps Waverly to find Doc's ring, which is the third seal. Doc and Wynonna save Nedley and capture Mercedes. The team extracts the venom from Mercedes and create an anti-venom, but Waverly trades the third seal for the anti-venom from Beth. The Iron Witch gets a wish from the demon in the trophy for one Earp sister to disappear to get revenge for the death of her twin sister, the Blacksmith. Doc touches the trophy while the Iron Witch asks for the wish and Doc vanishes. Wynonna disappears like she never existed and Waverly and Jeremy don't remember Wynonna. Doc is seen inside the well where Constance Clootie put him.
24	11	"Gone as a Girl Can Get"	Paolo Barzman	Alexandra Zarowny	August 18, 2017	0.48
In an alternate reality where Wynonna never existed, Doc is saved from the well by a revenant and Doc learns that he is the head of the revenants. Doc is captured by Dolls and is kept inside a cell with Mercedes. Doc and Mercedes remember Wynonna and learn that they are in an alternate reality created through a spell. Waverly meets Bobo, who is held inside a mental asylum. Bobo remembers Wynonna and is aware of the spell. Beth rescues Mercedes. Doc and Dolls shoot each other and they die. Before dying, Doc tells Waverly about the Iron Witch. Waverly and Nicole find the Iron Witch. The Iron Witch says that the spell can be broken if the trophy is destroyed by fire. The trophy is inside the Earp house barn but the revenants live in the Earp homestead as the talisman was never removed. Waverly breaks Bobo out of the mental asylum to help her recover the trophy. The twin demons know that Bobo moved the coffin of Bulshar to a different location. To destroy the trophy, Waverly explodes the barn. The spell is broken and everyone returns to the actual reality. Bobo destroys the third seal.
25	12	"I Hope You Dance"	Paolo Barzman	Emily Andras	August 25, 2017	0.44
Wynonna couldn't kill the twin demons with Peacemaker as they are immune to it. Bobo shows Bulshar's coffin to the twin demons. Mercedes cuts Bulshar's hand off and traps Bobo and Beth inside the place where Bulshar's coffin is. Wynonna and Waverly meet the Iron Witch. The Iron Witch makes a bullet from the plate inside the briefcase. Mercedes attacks Jeremy and Nicole. Beth escapes and attacks Waverly. Doc and Wynonna shoot each other and Wynonna's bullet splits into two, killing both of the twin demons. At Shorty's saloon, Rosita attacks Waverly to trade Wynonna's baby for money. Doc confronts Bobo and they fight. Doc injures Bobo and puts him in the well. The cult wants to take the baby but Dolls burns them. Wynonna gives birth to a baby girl. Waverly takes the baby and crosses the border of the Ghost River Triangle. Waverly and the baby are unharmed, confirming that neither of them are part revenant, and the father of the baby is Doc. The revenants come to take the baby but Wynonna kills the revenants with Peacemaker with the help of Dolls. Perry takes the baby to a safe place outside Purgatory. Nicole has Bulshar's ring. Wynonna names her baby Alice Michelle. Wynonna leaves Purgatory to meet her mother.

=== Season 3 (2018) ===
The episode titles for Season 3 were released on June 19, 2018. The first episode of the season was released as a special broadcast by Syfy on July 16, in advance of the season premiere on July 20, 2018.

No. overall	No. in season	Title	Directed by	Written by	Original release date	U.S. viewers (millions)
26	1	"Blood Red And Going Down"	Paolo Barzman	Emily Andras	July 16, 2018 (Note: The first episode of season 3 aired on Syfy as a "special preview" on July 16.) (USA); July 20, 2018 (USA and Canada)	0.37 (Note: Ratings for "special preview" of episode 3.01 on July 16.); 0.42
While searching for Bulshar, Wynonna fights and kills revenants with Peacemaker with the help of her team, consisting of Dolls, Doc, Jeremy, Waverly and Nicole. A group of people arrives in the Ghost River Triangle and Sheriff Nedley, under their influence, lets them in and calls them vampires. Wynonna and Doc train together. Wynonna, Waverly and Nicole inspect a massacre and Nicole says that a massacre had happened before and it is the work of the Cult of Bulshar. The vampire Petra hypnotizes Waverly and Nicole by touching them. The vampires attack Shorty's saloon, capture Doc and hypnotize Jeremy. Wynonna meets her mother inside prison. The vampire Contessa tortures Doc. Jeremy, Waverly and Nicole capture Wynonna and put her in a casket to deliver her to Petra. The vampires host a party in the Gardners' residence. Dolls rescues Wynonna and brings weapons to kill the vampires. Dolls and Wynonna kill the vampires and rescue the people controlled by the vampires. Doc escapes capture and joins the team. Wynonna and Waverly's car crashes on their way to meet their mother in prison.
27	2	"When You Call My Name"	Paolo Barzman	Caitlin D. Fryers	July 27, 2018	0.48
A cannibal revenant kidnaps Waverly from the car crash site, who steals her voice. Wynonna sees her mother in a vision, which guides her to climb a cliff but she can't take Peacemaker along with her. Nicole finds the car crash site and calls Doc. Wynonna finds Waverly. Wynonna tricks the cannibal revenant and pushes him into his own trap. Waverly gets her voice back. Doc, Nicole and Dolls find the Earp girls. Nicole tries to get the Peacemaker by climbing down the cliff with the help of a rope but a demon cuts the rope. Dolls fights the demon and sacrifices himself to kill the demon. Nicole retrieves Peacemaker and Waverly and Wynonna pull Nicole up.
28	3	"Colder Weather"	Ron Murphy	Emily Andras	August 3, 2018	0.51
A revenant tries to kill drunk Wynonna but Waverly and Nicole chase him away. Some revenants steal Dolls's drugs from Shorty's saloon. Dolls's friend arrives in Purgatory after hearing about Dolls's death. Dolls left an envelope for Wynonna consisting of a group photo of the team. Contessa steals the envelope from Waverly and Waverly tells Doc about the theft of the envelope. The revenants who took Dolls's drugs inject themselves with them and attack Shorty's. Wynonna kills some of the revenants with Peacemaker but some revenants escape. Doc reveals to Waverly that Contessa is his wife. Waverly and Doc find Contessa at the Gardners' residence and retrieve the envelope. Dolls's friend tortures Jeremy for Dolls's drugs but Wynonna talks him out of it and he leaves Purgatory. Waverly gives the envelope to Wynonna. Doc and Contessa get intimate.
29	4	"No Cure For Crazy"	Ron Murphy	Brendon Yorke	August 10, 2018	0.54
Doc and Wynonna chase a revenant and the revenant is stopped by a moving tree. Wynonna tries to shoot the revenant but Peacemaker doesn't work. Nicole throws Bulshar's ring into the woods. Waverly goes to meet her mother, Michelle Gibson, in prison. Jeremy and Robin go into the woods to find the murder tree but instead they see stairs. Wynonna goes to meet Michelle in prison but Michelle escapes captivity and steals Peacemaker. Wynonna is held captive in Michelle's prison cell. Jeremy calls Doc. Doc reaches the woods and briefly meets Bulshar, who wants to make a deal with Doc. A revenant prison guard tortures Wynonna. Wynonna decapitates the revenant and gets out of prison. Michelle comes to the Earp home's barn to kill a demon named Jolene. Robin finds mysterious plants outside his house and is taken away by a tree. Jolene puts Waverly, Wynonna, Doc and Nicole in a trance and locks Michelle in the barn.
30	5	"Jolene"	Paolo Barzman	Shelley Scarrow	August 17, 2018	0.60
Michelle, Wynonna, Waverly, Nicole and Doc are still under the trance of Jolene. Michelle reveals that Waverly's father's name is Julian. Jolene makes the team believe that the revenant prison guard is the demon hunting Waverly. Wynonna shoots the revenant prison guard with Peacemaker. Doc meets Bobo briefly. Jolene makes the team hate each other and everyone at Shorty's starts to fight. Nicole arrests Michelle and Wynonna. Waverly tells Doc that Nicole has Bulshar's ring. Bulshar's ring comes back to Nicole's house even after she throws it into the woods. Jolene touches Bulshar's ring and it hurts her. Nicole reveals to Jolene that Bulshar has risen and Jolene attacks Nicole. Everyone learns that Jolene is a demon after the trance state wears off. Jolene reveals to Waverly that they were born together to balance each other. Wynonna shoots Jolene before Jolene can kill Waverly. Bulshar captures Jolene inside a tree. Doc is seen wearing Bulshar's ring. Wynonna meets Bobo and he reveals to Wynonna that Julian is an angel.
31	6	"If We Make It Through December"	Paolo Barzman	Emily Andras & Matt Doyle	August 24, 2018	0.48
Bulshar, dressed as Santa Claus, kidnaps a kid during Christmas celebrations in Purgatory. Michelle talks to Wynnona and Waverly about Julian and also mentions that Bobo was there when Waverly was born. Waverly meets Bobo briefly to learn more about the day she was born. Bulshar has locked up the descendants of the family who lived in Purgatory since the beginning and tortures them, as their ancestors betrayed him to Wyatt Earp. Wynonna and Charlie, a fire fighter, find Bulshar's lair and rescue the people who were locked up by Bulshar. Charlie and Wynonna get intimate. Michelle helps Bobo escape the well in exchange for information about Julian's location. Contessa bites Doc to make him a Vampire. Nedley retires from being the sheriff and Nicole is appointed as the new sheriff of Purgatory.
32	7	"I Fall To Pieces"	Grant Harvey	Noelle Carbone	August 31, 2018	0.50
Bulshar's ring hurts Doc as he is a vampire now. Nedley shows Nicole and Wynonna a secret locker filled with evidence collected on undocumented supernatural cases. Wynonna argues with Nicole and breaks some of the evidence, and a mysterious man is seen to be awakened. Doc and Michelle go to a graveyard. Nicole's cop car is stolen. Wynonna and Nicole find the car parked outside a biker's bar (occupied by revenants) with the help of Jeremy. Jeremy and Waverly try to fix the things which were broken by Wynonna. Michelle reveals to Doc that she helped Bobo escape the well. Wynonna and Nicole participate in a drinking contest to escape the revenants. Wynonna shoots some revenants with Peacemaker. The mysterious man is looking for his wife. Waverly and Jeremy fix a broken doll and the mysterious man takes the doll, Monique (the mysterious man's wife), and leaves. Doc helps Michelle to leave Purgatory to find Julian. Doc gives Bulshar's ring to Wynonna and she learns that Doc is a vampire, which leads to an argument.
33	8	"Waiting Forever For You"	Grant Harvey	Caitlin D. Fryers	September 7, 2018	0.50
Wynonna gives Bulshar's ring to Jeremy and Jeremy locks it in a safe. Bulshar revives Constance Clootie. Doc bites Robin. Wynonna meets Contessa. At Shorty's saloon, Charlie and Doc capture Constance. Bulshar's ring comes back to Nicole. Robin is connected to Bulshar somehow. Constance escapes capture and steals Doc's car. Waverly wears Bulshar's ring but she can't remove it. Wynonna shoots Constance with Peacemaker. Contessa reveals to Wynonna that Contessa became a Vampire to search for Doc after Constance put Doc in the well. Robin reveals that Bulshar has already found the Garden of Eden. Bulshar attacks Wynonna and Doc at the Earp house barn.
34	9	"Undo It"	April Mullen	Brendon Yorke	September 14, 2018	0.49
Bulshar puts Wynonna and Doc in a dream state but Peacemaker wakes Wynonna up. Bulshar puts Wynonna in a seemingly endless dream time loop. (In the dream loop, the following things are revealed: 1. the loop resets every time Wynonna or Bobo dies; 2. Doc has been buried alive; 3. Peacemaker protects the Garden of Eden; 4. Wynonna has to willingly give Bulshar Peacemaker so that Bulshar can enter the Garden of Eden; 5. Bulshar won't die by the bullets from Peacemaker as Bulshar is not part of the Earp curse; 6. Wynonna gives Peacemaker willingly to escape the dream loop.) Waverly and Nicole go to the Gardners' residence and meet Mercedes. At the Gardners' residence, an electrically powered revenant named Derek attempts to take Bulshar's ring. Waverly burns Derek with the help of Bulshar's ring. Waverly, Jeremy and Nicole rescue Bobo from the place where Bulshar put Bobo and Bobo is wakes up from the dream loop. Bobo reveals to Waverly that Bulshar's ring is actually Julian's ring. Waverly, Jeremy and Nicole reunite with Doc and Wynonna at the place where Doc and Wynonna were held captive by Bulshar. Mercedes believes that Waverly has cured her.
35	10	"The Other Woman"	April Mullen	Noelle Carbone	September 21, 2018	0.46
Bobo is held captive at the police station and he gets a vision from 1887 when Peacemaker was actually a sword. A mysterious woman named Kate arrives at the Earps' home. Doc identifies a girl in a photo as Maeve Perley, a Fire Witch, who has a book which contains information on Bulshar. Kevin suggests to use Bulshar's severed arm as a weapon. Doc and Nicole go to Maeve's house and Maeve possesses Nicole. Wynonna and Waverly go to the mine where Bobo has kept Bulshar's coffin to retrieve Bulshar's arm. A radioactive revenant comes out of the mine with Bulshar's arm. Doc calls Jeremy for help and finds the book. Maeve leaves Nicole and burns the house. Wynonna and Waverly fight the radioactive revenant at the Gardners' residence. Waverly uses Julian's ring to control Bulshar's arm, and Waverly and Wynonna separate the arm from the revenant. Charlie saves Doc from the burning house and Doc bites and kills Charlie. With the help of the book, Jeremy finds out that Bulshar was created inside the Garden of Eden as a snake, the Basilisk. Kevin confirms that Waverly healed Mercedes with Julian's ring. Mercedes is kidnapped.
36	11	"Daddy Lessons"	Paolo Barzman	Shelley Scarrow	September 28, 2018	0.39
Bobo is still being held captive in the police station where Jeremy is analyzing Bulshar's arm. Waverly uses Julian's ring to revive Charlie. Purgatory is evacuated. Doc hypnotizes two people and Doc and Contessa feed on their blood in Shorty's basement. Some revenants kidnap Wynonna. Doc shoots a fire fighter and injures Contessa while looking for Charlie. Wynonna tasks Charlie to get Waverly out of Purgatory. Nicole tends to Contessa's wound. Charlie takes Waverly to Michelle's greenhouse, where flowers start to bloom suddenly. The revenants give a feast to Bulshar in Bulshar's lair, where Mercedes poses as Bulshar's wife. Wynonna believes Bulshar can't touch her due to the Earp curse. At the greenhouse, with the help of Julian's ring, Waverly learns that Charlie is actually Julian. Wynonna escapes capture with the help of Mercedes and a revenant, and turns most of the revenants against Bulshar while Bulshar escapes. At the greenhouse, Doc attacks Waverly but Julian takes the ring and wears it to save Waverly and knock Doc unconscious. Doc finds something looking like a sword at the greenhouse inside a broken statue. Bobo accepts Bulshar's offer to be his lieutenant so Bulshar releases Bobo from his cell.
37	12	"War Paint"	Paolo Barzman	Emily Andras	September 28, 2018	0.34
Wynonna buries the talisman to allow the revenants into the Earp homestead. The stairs in the woods are the way to the Garden of Eden. Bulshar reshapes the Peacemaker into a sword to open the gate to the Garden of Eden. Bulshar needs Wynonna's blood to enter the Garden of Eden. Waverly reveals to Wynonna that Charlie is Julian. Nicole and Contessa fight off an attack by Bulshar's minions at the Gardners' residence but Nicole is seriously injured. Nedley saves Jeremy and Robin from Bulshar's minions' attack at the police station. Doc takes Nicole to the Earp homestead. Julian heals Nicole with his ring. Doc gives the sword he found at the greenhouse to Julian and Julian gives his ring to Waverly. Jeremy develops a serum using Bulshar's arm. Bulshar's army fights against the army of revenants and Wynonna's team at the Earp homestead. Bobo kidnaps Wynonna, then Bulshar takes Wynonna's blood. Bobo kills Julian with Julian's sword. Doc saves Wynonna from being killed. Waverly hurts Bobo with Julian's ring. Bulshar breaks the Earp curse with Wynonna's blood and all the revenants vanish. Jeremy arrives at the Earp homestead with a crypsis. Wynonna reveals to the team that the Earp curse has been broken. Wynonna and Waverly use the crypsis to get past Bulshar's minions unnoticed and fight Bulshar. Waverly, being an angel, makes Wynonna the chosen one to wield Peacemaker, a flaming sword. Bulshar and Wynonna fight. Waverly is trapped in the stairs. Wynonna kills Bulshar with the Peacemaker sword but Bulshar bites Wynonna to poison her before he dies. Doc sucks the poison out of Wynonna. Waverly is taken inside the Garden of Eden by tentacles looking like tree roots. Doc enters the Garden of Eden to rescue Waverly. "VALDEZ" is carved inside Wynonna's house. Wynonna and Nedley prepare for what comes next.

=== Season 4 (2020–21) ===
No. overall	No. in season	Title	Directed by	Written by	Original release date	U.S. viewers (millions)
Part 1
38	1	"On the Road Again"	Paolo Barzman	Brendon Yorke	July 26, 2020	0.46
Wynonna and Nedley find the stairs but are unable to enter the Garden of Eden. Wynonna and Nedley are attacked by spider-like creatures and Nedley is injured. Waverly is seen to be chained. VALDEZ is seen to be carved by Jeremy. Wynonna finds Julian's ring and Mercedes arrives at the Earp homestead. Nicole wakes up in a train along with Contessa. Wynonna, Nedley and Mercedes search Dolls' files and find a file in the name of Dr. Gloria Valdez. Contessa helps Nicole escape the train and bites a guard. Doc saves Waverly. Nicole finds Wynonna. Doc and Waverly search for a way out. Wynonna and Nicole arrive at a Black Badge Division facility located in Monument town to find Dr. Gloria Valdez, but instead they find Rachel Valdez, Gloria's daughter. The facility is filled with zombies, which Wynonna, Nicole and Rachel fight through. Nicole falls through a hole that seemingly portals Nicole to the Garden of Eden. Doc finds Nicole naked in the Garden of Eden.
39	2	"Friends in Low Places"	Paolo Barzman	Emily Andras	August 2, 2020	0.27
Nicole is seen to be trapped inside the Garden of Eden. Waverly and Nicole chat while Doc explores the Garden of Eden. Nicole is still inside the Black Badge Division facility at Monument but is seriously injured. Wynonna and Rachel find Nicole and a dead Dr. Gloria Valdez. Doc learns that the Nicole in the Garden of Eden is an imprisoned imposter. The imposter is released and revealed to be a demon shapeshifter named Eve. Doc injures Eve. Wynonna and Rachel open a portal, which Wynonna enters to reach the Garden of Eden. Waverly sits on a throne to be a guardian inside the Garden of Eden. Doc kicks Eve through a portal. Wynonna, Waverly and Doc travel through a portal and return to Purgatory. Nicole and Waverly unite at the Earp homestead and get intimate. Nicole reveals to Waverly that more than 18 months have passed.
40	3	"Look at Them Beans"	Melanie Scrofano	Shelley Scarrow	August 9, 2020	0.35
Chrissy Nedley arrests Wynonna for the murder of Randy Nedley. Waverly meets Rachel. Doc falls into a trap set for monsters outside the Earp homestead. Wynonna is placed in a prison cell along with Casey, a half demon. Casey tells Wynonna about the things that happened in Purgatory during the past 18 months. Doc visits a demon bar owned by Amon to find Mercedes. Mercedes pretends to be a demon and performs at the bar. Waverly tries to get Wynonna out of prison. Mercedes reveals to Doc that Randy went into the woods and never came back. Mercedes gives out the location of a monster named People Eater who might have killed Randy. At Shorty's saloon, Wynonna participates in a chilli cookoff to get free from prison. The People Eater chases Doc to the Earp homestead. Wynonna wins the chilli cookoff but is captured and offered as food for the People Eater. Doc theorizes that the People Eater is a parasite and Randy is the host. Doc, Waverly and Nicole capture the People Eater, cure Randy and save Wynonna. Chrissy and Randy reunite. Doc makes a deal with Amon for a future favor. Waverly and Nicole go to check the traps. Chrissy leaves Purgatory and informs Jeremy about the return of Doc and the Earp girls. Wynonna is captured from the Earp homestead barn by armed men.
41	4	"Afraid"	Ron Murphy	Matt Doyle	August 16, 2020	0.23
Wynonna is captured by Black Badge Division. Mysterious rune stones carved with a symbol resembling "C" end up with Wynonna. Wynonna reunites with Jeremy, who gives Wynona a tour of the BBD facility. Rachel hangs out with Billy, who she believes is hiding something. Waverly, Nicole and Rachel search for Peacemaker in a junkyard where a demon is being held captive. Nicole had made a deal with Margo Clanton, the owner of the Junkyard and mother of Billy. BBD sends Wynonna in a truck to protect it from robbery. Doc is actually stealing from the trucks to sell the contents to the demon bar for money. The symbol from the rune stone can be seen in the Junkyard. The demon from the Junkyard comes to kill Wynonna. Rachel is wearing Wynonna's jacket and finds a rune stone in its pocket. Waverly learns that the symbol on the rune stones represents the Clantons, who are sworn enemies of the Earp family. Billy thinks Margo marked Rachel. Billy reveals that only the people who have been marked can see the reaper (the demon from the Junkyard) and the Clantons control the reaper. Billy uses a covenant to save Rachel from the reaper but the reaper was actually sent after Wynonna and not Rachel. Margo gives orders to the reaper and Billy screams as the reaper comes closer to him. Margo finds out that Cleo Clanton marked Wynonna and punishes her. Nicole gives something to Margo as part of their deal.
42	5	"Holy War Part 1"	Ron Murphy	Noelle Carbone	August 23, 2020	0.27
The Earp homestead is set on fire. Doc and Wynonna meet Amon in the demon bar and Amon gives information on Peacemaker. Black Badge Division seize control of the police station from the Clantons. Rachel goes looking for Billy. Wynonna and Doc visit a museum to steal a painting. Dark magic makes Nicole vomit frogs whenever she tries to talk about the deal she made with Margo. Wynonna is teleported to a sanctuary of scorned women through a Celtic sisters knot. Peacemaker is hidden in the sanctuary, which is filled with nuns. Doc meets Holt Clayborn in the demon bar. The dark magic on Nicole makes her attack Wynonna and it is revealed that Nicole set the homestead on fire. Rachel finds Billy's phone but is unable to see Billy because he is now a reaper.
43	6	"Holy War Part 2"	Ron Murphy	Brendon Yorke	August 30, 2020	0.34
Jeremy and Randy perform an exorcism to save Nicole from the dark magic. Margo (the Swamp Witch) marks Waverly to be killed by the reaper. The painting Wynonna stole from the museum leads to Rosita. Holt arrests Rachel. Wynonna and Rosita teleport to the sanctuary. The nuns in the sanctuary make Wynonna and Rosita fight each other. The exorcism is interrupted by the arrival of a reaper. Nicole is temporarily drowned as part of the exorcism and becomes a ghost. As a ghost, Nicole possesses the reaper and makes it say how to break the covenant that Nicole made. The leader of the nuns is revealed to be a demon. Rosita and Wynonna work together to search for Peacemaker and escape the nuns. Doc talks with Holt and Rachel is released. Wynonna finds Peacemaker and kills the demon nun. The other nuns are released from the demon nun's hold. Rosita decides to stay at the sanctuary. Waverly kills Margo and Nicole comes back alive. Wynonna shoots Clayborn in the back despite Doc trying to end the feud between the Earps and the Clantons without any more bloodshed. Waverly proposes to Nicole, who happily accepts.
Part 2
44	7	"Love's All Over"	Paolo Barzman	Shelley Scarrow	March 5, 2021	0.34
Nicole and Waverly celebrate their engagement with Wynonna in a pub. Waverly accidentally makes an ill-advised bet about love with a male stripper named Demetri. Demetri puts a mysterious object in Waverly's pocket that infects people close to her with intense love. Doc visits and comforts Cleo, who is mourning the death of Margo and Holt. Waverly meets Demetri, who explains the mysterious object and the love spell. Waverly learns that Demetri is a cupid. Waverly explains the love spell to Wynonna. Wynonna then steals the mysterious object from Waverly. Rachel goes into the basement at Shorty's saloon, where Billy is being held captive. Wynonna spills the contents of the mysterious object and everyone is affected by the love spell. Demetri and Waverly reverse the effects of the love spell. Cleo feeds the remains of Margo to the reapers. Rachel releases Billy, who reunites with Cleo. Amon and Wynonna get intimate.
45	8	"Hell Raisin' Good Time"	Paolo Barzman	Caitlin D. Fryers	March 12, 2021	0.28
It's halloween in Purgatory and a scarecrow comes to life and kills two Black Badge Division soldiers. Jeremy tells Wynonna and Waverly that the town is being terrorized by a sacrecrow (pumpkin-faced demon / Te Deum Cleobis / Rotten Jack). Amon livestreams and hosts bets with other demons about the possible victims of Rotten Jack. Amon and Doc argue, leading to Doc breaking their deal. Waverly and Wynonna search for Rotten Jack and meet Casey. Casey tricks Wynonna and Waverly into entering a mysterious fog that erases their memories. Robin and Jeremy have a brief conversation. Amon sends demons to kill Doc, but Doc escapes. Doc explains to Jeremy the Earp girls' memory loss. Amon takes Wynonna and Waverly to the demon bar to kill them on livestream. Doc convinces Casey to help. Jeremy arrives at the demon bar disguised as a demon and cures Wynonna and Waverly. Rotten Jack attacks the demon bar and the team kills him. Jeremy theorizes that the fog might be coming from the garden and also reveals that Robin went into the fog and lost his memory. Doc lets other demons kill Amon.
46	9	"Crazy"	Jem Garrard	Matt Doyle	March 19, 2021	0.33
Wynonna and Nicole train together. Someone is killing trivia winners and bite marks can be seen on a victim's neck. Wynonna talks to Doc about the killings at the demon bar. Jeremy and Waverly find out that the killer is stealing brains. Wynonna and Waverly investigate and find that Doug Warner (who calls himself Demon Kuru) is killing people with the help of a genie. Doug escapes but Wynonna arrests the genie to stop her from granting any more deadly wishes. Doug helps the genie to escape prison and Doug tries to take Wynonna's brain. A spell is placed on trivia night by the genie to prevent anyone from leaving until there is a winner. Jeremy wins the trivia night and the spell is broken. Doug dies because of eating human brains. Nicole is reinstated as the sheriff of Purgatory. Wynonna shoots the genie with Peacemaker.
47	10	"Life Turned Her That Way"	Jem Garrard	Noelle Carbone	March 26, 2021	0.30
Demons chase Waverly, who runs into the fog, reaching a cabin where she finds Jolene. Doc and many demons are captured by Black Badge Division (BBD). Rachel wants to train with Wynonna. A BBD soldier kills a demon with a flame thrower. Wynonna asks Casey to navigate through the fog to help Waverly. Jolene tortures Waverly. Nicole and Casey enter the fog to find Waverly and reach the Cabin. Jolene kills Casey but Nicole escapes and informs Wynonna about Jolene. Jeremy is also held captive by BBD. Wynonna convinces BBD's General Graham to release Cleo. Wynonna asks Cleo to mark Jolene so that the reaper can find the cabin. Jolene knocks the reaper unconscious and throws Wynonna into the fog. The dark side of Waverly takes over, transforming her into a demon. Waverly kills Jolene. Graham shoots Mercedes. Waverly and Wynonna come out of the fog separately.
48	11	"Better Dig Two"	Paolo Barzman	Emily Andras	April 2, 2021	0.20
After Waverly's transformation, the fog disappears. Waverly temporarily blinds Wynonna. Cleo makes Rachel perform a ritual to turn Billy human and the ritual works. Mercedes agrees to become a vampire to survive the gunshot. Doc bites Mercedes and Mercedes turns into a vampire. Doc and Mercedes break out of prison, and Nicole forces General Graham at gun point to let everyone escape the Black Badge Division facility. Cleo kidnaps Rachel but Wynonna saves her. Cleo performs a ritual such that Doc becomes the Clanton heir, and he's out for Wynonna's blood. Wynonna shoots Holt (now a reaper). Nedley helps Billy to perform a ritual. Wynonna convinces Waverly to save Doc. After saving Doc, Waverly turns all the Clanton reapers into birds. As Waverly attempts to enter the Garden of Eden, Nicole makes a deal with Waverly to become the angel shield and Waverly goes back to normal. Jeremy lets a demon kill Graham. Doc is no longer a vampire.
49	12	"Old Souls"	Paolo Barzman	Emily Andras	April 9, 2021	0.28
Wynonna dons Waverly's wedding dress and is unable to remove it. Doc and Wynonna visit the boutique from which Waverly bought the wedding dress. Nicole and Waverly learn that the wedding dress is haunted. Waverly finds a way to remove the haunted wedding dress from Wynonna. Nicole and Waverly are married at the Earp homestead. Wynonna and Doc leave Purgatory together.

== Ratings ==
Wynonna Earp : U.S. viewers per episode (thousands)

Season	Episode number													Average
Season	1	2	3	4	5	6	7	8	9	10	11	12	13	Average
1	800	650	640	570	640	550	400	570	390	540	520	530	450	560
2	460	570	500	580	500	500	400	570	530	470	480	440	–	500
3	420	480	510	540	600	480	500	500	490	460	390	340	–	470
4	460	270	350	230	270	340	340	280	330	300	200	280	–	300

Audience measurement performed by Nielsen Media Research
