= Aurora Award for Best Visual Presentation =

Annual Canadian science fiction and fantasy award

- Sponsored by: Canadian SF and Fantasy Association and SFSF Boreal Inc.
- First award: 2016
- Final award: 2022

The Aurora Awards are granted annually by the Canadian SF and Fantasy Association and SFSF Boreal Inc. The Award for Best Visual Presentation was first awarded in 2016 and last awarded in 2022. Previously film and television works had been under the Best Related Work category, and several TV show episodes had won that award. The French-language equivalent is given in the Best Audio, Visual and Artistic Creation category, which doesn't have a direct English-language equivalent.

Like the other categories in the Aurora Awards, only Canadians are credited, and so only the Canadian directors or production companies that work on the films and television series are recognized.

== Winners and nominees ==
* Winners and joint winners

Year	Creators/Directors	Work	Production Company	Result	Ref.
2016	John Fawcett* & Graeme Manson*	Orphan Black (Season 3)	Temple Street Productions & Bell Media	Winner	
2016	Daegan Fryklind	Bitten (Season 2)	Hoodwink Entertainment, No Equal Entertainment, Entertainment One, Bell Media	Finalist	
2016	Simon Barry	Continuum (Season 4)	Reunion Pictures, Shaw Media & Boy Meets Girl Film Company	Finalist	
2016	Joseph Mallozzi	Dark Matter (Season 1)	Prodigy Pictures Inc.	Finalist	
2016	Michelle Lovretta	Killjoys (Season 1)	Mendacity Pictures, Bell Media & Temple Street Productions	Finalist	
2017	Denis Villeneuve*	Arrival	N/A	Winner	
2017	Joseph Mallozzi	Dark Matter (Season 2)	Prodigy Pictures Inc.	Finalist	
2017	Michelle Lovretta	Killjoys (Season 2)	Mendacity Pictures, Bell Media & Temple Street Productions	Finalist	
2017	R. B. Carney, Cal Coons & Alexandra Zarowny	Murdoch Mysteries (Season 9)	Shaftesbury Films	Finalist	
2017	John Fawcett & Graeme Manson	Orphan Black (Season 4)	Temple Street Productions & Bell Media	Finalist	
2018	Denis Villeneuve*	Blade Runner 2049	N/A	Winner	
2018	Joseph Mallozzi	Dark Matter (Season 3)	Prodigy Pictures Inc.	Finalist	
2018	Michelle Lovretta	Killjoys (Season 3)	Mendacity Pictures, Bell Media & Temple Street Productions	Finalist	
2018	John Fawcett & Graeme Manson	Orphan Black (Season 5)	Temple Street Productions & Bell Media	Finalist	
2018	Brad Wright (creator)	Travelers (Season 2)	Showcase	Finalist	
2018	Emily Andras (creator)	Wynonna Earp (Season 2)	SEVEN24 Films	Finalist	
2019	Ryan Reynolds* (producer)	Deadpool 2	20th Century Fox	Winner	
2019	Domee Shi (director)	Bao	Walt Disney, Pixar Animation Studios	Finalist	
2019	Christina Jennings (executive producer) & Peter Mitchell (showrunner)	Murdoch Mysteries (Season 11-12)	Shaftesbury Films	Finalist	
2019	Brad Wright (creator), with Carrie Mudd, John G. Lenic, and Eric McCormack	Travelers (Season 3)	Netflix	Finalist	
2019	Emily Andras (creator)	Wynonna Earp (Season 3)	SEVEN24 Films	Finalist	
2020	Steve Blackman* (creator)	The Umbrella Academy	Dark Horse Entertainment, Borderline Entertainment, Universal Cable Productions	Winner	
2020	Adam Barken & Michelle Lovretta (showrunner)	Killjoys (Season 5)	Temple Street Productions	Finalist	
2020	Christina Jennings (executive producer) & Peter Mitchell (showrunner)	Murdoch Mysteries (Season 12-13)	Shaftesbury Films	Finalist	
2020	Glenn Davis & William Laurin	V Wars	Netflix	Finalist	
2020	Jonathan Lloyd Walker	Van Helsing (Season 4)	Echo Lake Entertainment, Dynamic Television, Nomadic Pictures	Finalist	
2021	Steve Blackman* (creator)	The Umbrella Academy	Dark Horse Entertainment, Borderline Entertainment, Universal Cable Productions	Winner	
2021	Tony Elliott (creator) & Michelle Latimer (creator)	Don't Text Back		Finalist	
2021	Christina Jennings (executive producer) & Peter Mitchell (showrunner), with Scott Garvie, Yannick Bisson, Hélène Joy	Murdoch Mysteries (Season 13)	Shaftesbury Films	Finalist	
2021	Kaye Adelaide & Mariel Sharp	Trickster (Ep. 1-6)		Finalist	
2021	Emily Andras (creator)	Wynonna Earp (Season 4, Ep. 1-6)	SEVEN24 Films	Finalist	
2022	Denis Villeneuve* (director)	Dune	Legendary Entertainment	Winner	
2022	Zacharias Kunuk	Angakusajaujuq: The Shaman's Apprentice	Kingulliit Productions; Taqqut Productions	Finalist	
2022	Shawn Levy (director)	Free Guy	20th Century Studios	Finalist	
2022	Jason Reitman (director)	Ghostbusters: Afterlife	Columbia Pictures	Finalist	
2022	Emily Andras (showrunner)	Wynonna Earp (Season 4, Ep. 7-12)	Seven24 Films	Finalist	
