= Wynonna Earp =

Comic book

- Cover of Home on the Strange (Part 2)

Publication information
- Publisher: Image Comics; IDW Publishing
- First appearance: Wynonna Earp # 1 (December 1996)
- Created by: Beau Smith

In-story information
- Team affiliations: U.S. Marshals
Wynonna Earp
- Format: Limited series
- Genre: Weird West

Wynonna Earp is a horror Western comic book miniseries created and owned by Beau Smith. The series was initially published by Image Comics, and from 2003 by IDW Publishing.

== Plot summary ==
Wynonna is a present-day descendant of the famous lawman Wyatt Earp, and she is the top agent for a special unit known within the US Marshals as the Monster Squad. She battles such supernatural threats as Bobo Del Rey and his redneck, trailer-trash vampires who are pushing a new killer designer drug called "Hemo", and the Egyptian mafia's mummy hitman, Raduk, Eater of the Dead, who is out to do in all the other crime bosses. In her subsequent adventures, she finished some outstanding Earp family business while dealing with Hillbilly Gremlins and Zombie Mailmen alongside her fellow marshals.

== Publication ==
=== Comicbook ===
Wynonna Earp was originally released by Image Comics as a five-issue series from 1996 to 1997. The three-part series Wynonna Earp: Home on the Strange was published by IDW Publishing in 2003–2004. A four-volume graphic novel Wynonna Earp: The Yeti Wars was released by IDW Publishing in 2011. A limited series titled simply Wynonna Earp, with additional sub and exclusive covers, was released as a tie-in with the television series in 2016. A four-part series, Wynonna Earp Legends, with additional sub and exclusive covers, was released in 2016-17. It was co-written with two stars of the television series: Legends: Doc Holliday (#1, #2) with Tim Rozon, and Legends: The Earp Sisters (#3, #4) (Note: Wynonna Earp Legends: The Earp Sisters is the comic series' debut of character Waverly Earp.) with Melanie Scrofano.

=== Paperback ===
- The Complete Wynonna Earp (initial miniseries, the follow-up "Home on the Strange", and her adventure from "Tales of Terror"), 200 pages, IDW Publishing, September 1, 2005, ISBN 1-933239-01-8.
- Wynonna Earp: The Yeti Wars (collects the four volumes in the Yeti Wars series and a previously unpublished story, "Wynonna Earp: Blood is the Harvest"), IDW Publishing, 2010, ISBN 9781600108075.
- Wynonna Earp: Strange Inheritance (all issues released before 2016: "Wynonna Earp" #1–5 by Image Comics, "Wynonna Earp: Home on the Strange" #1–3, "Blood is the Harvest" from Tales of Terror, and "Wynonna Earp: The Yeti Wars" #1–4), 300 pages, IDW Publishing, April 2016, ISBN 978-1-63140-602-7.

=== Hardcover ===
Wynonna Earp appeared in the hardcover anthology Tales of Terror Volume #1 (96 pages, IDW Publishing, First printing September 2004, ISBN 1-932382-31-3).

== TV adaptation ==
In July 2015, Syfy acquired the rights for a television series. Melanie Scrofano was cast in the title role, with Tim Rozon as Doc Holliday and Shamier Anderson as Agent Dolls. Dominique Provost-Chalkley was cast as Waverly Earp, Wynonna's younger sister.

The series was developed by Emily Andras, who also serves as executive producer and showrunner. Jordy Randall and Tom Cox serve as executive producers with Andras, and Paolo Barzman directed the pilot episode.

Syfy released the first promotional images and synopsis for Wynonna Earp on November 6, 2015:

After years on the run and in juvenile detention, Wynonna Earp is finally coming home. The only problem is no one back home wants her to return. But when she becomes the town's only hope of eradicating mysterious demons, Wynonna must choose which side of the law she wants to fight on in order to clear the name of her legendary great grandfather Wyatt Earp once and for all.

The teaser trailer for the new series was released in January 2016.

Wynonna Earp premiered in the United States on Syfy on April 1, 2016, and in Canada on CHCH-DT on April 4, 2016. The series was renewed for a second season on July 23, 2016. Season two premiered on Syfy and Space (Canada) on June 9, 2017. It was renewed for a third season on July 22, 2017. A fourth and final season was announced by Syfy and Space on July 21, 2018. The series finale, "Old Souls," premiered on April 10, 2021.

== Awards and nominations ==
In 2017, Wynonna Earp was nominated for a Dragon Award for Best Comic Book: Wynonna Earp Legends by Beau Smith, Tim Rozon, Melanie Scrofano, and Chris Evenhuis.

== See also ==
- Djustine
- The Sixth Gun
- Weird Western Tales
