= Wynonna Earp (TV series) =

2010s TV series

- Wynonna Earp title card
- Genre: Dark fantasy; Drama; Weird West; Supernatural
- Created by: Emily Andras
- Based on: Wynonna Earp by Beau Smith
- Starring: Melanie Scrofano; Shamier Anderson; Tim Rozon; Dominique Provost-Chalkley; Katherine Barrell
- Opening theme: "Tell That Devil" by Jill Andrews
- Composers: Robert Carli; Peter Chapman
- Countries of origin: Canada; United States
- Original language: English
- No. of seasons: 4
- No. of episodes: 49 (+ 1 special) (list of episodes)

Production
- Executive producers: Emily Andras; Brian Dennis; Ted Adams; David Ozer; Rick Jacobs; Todd Berger; Jordy Randall; Tom Cox; Peter Emerson; Brett Burlock
- Production locations: Alberta, Canada
- Running time: 43 minutes
- Production companies: SEVEN24 Films; IDW Entertainment; Cineflix Studios

Original release
- Network: Syfy (United States); CHCH-DT (season 1; Canada); Space (seasons 2–3; Canada); CTV Sci-Fi Channel (season 4; Canada)
- Release: April 1, 2016 – April 9, 2021
- Network: Tubi
- Release: September 13, 2024 (special)

Wynonna Earp (/waɪˈnoʊnə ˈɜːrp/ wy-NOH-nə URP) is a supernatural Western television series developed by Emily Andras, and based on the comic book series by Beau Smith. Melanie Scrofano portrays the titular character, the great-great-granddaughter of legendary lawman Wyatt Earp who returns to her hometown of Purgatory, near the Canadian Rockies, where she battles revenants, the reincarnated outlaws that Wyatt killed. The series also stars Shamier Anderson, Tim Rozon, Dominique Provost-Chalkley, and Katherine Barrell in main roles.

The series premiered on Syfy in the United States on April 1, 2016 and on CHCH-DT in Canada on April 4. In July 2016, the series was renewed for a second season which premiered on June 9, 2017, on Syfy and moved to Space (later rebranded to CTV Sci-Fi Channel) in Canada. In July 2017, the series was renewed for a third season which premiered on July 20, 2018. In July 2018, the series was renewed for a fourth season, which later remained in limbo for several months due to financial difficulties at production company IDW Entertainment. The first half of the fourth season premiered on July 26, 2020. In February 2021, Syfy announced that the fourth season would be the last, with the second half of the fourth season premiering on March 5, 2021.

In February 2024, a one-off special titled Wynonna Earp: Vengeance was commissioned by Tubi that premiered on September 13, 2024, with Scrofano, Rozon, Provost-Chalkley, Barrell, Greg Lawson, Dani Kind, and Varun Saranga reprising their respective roles.

The series received generally positive reviews from critics. E! Entertainment Television named Wynonna Earp the "Best New Show" of 2016. In its annual "Best of TV" highlight, Collider named Wynonna Earp the "Best New Sci-Fi" show of 2016. It was chosen by Variety as one of the 20 best new series of 2016 and one of the best television shows of 2017.

== Plot ==
On her 27th birthday, Wynonna Earp, the great-great-granddaughter of legendary lawman Wyatt Earp, inherits the special power to return revenants, the reincarnated outlaws that Wyatt had killed, back to Hell. Using her ancestor's magic gun, "Peacemaker," Wynonna works to break her family's curse by sending demons back where they belong. She also fights other supernatural beings that inhabit the Ghost River Triangle, a cursed territory near the Canadian Rockies that includes Purgatory, her hometown. After being recruited by the Black Badge Division (BBD), a secret government agency led by Special Agent Xavier Dolls, she is joined by an ageless Doc Holliday and Wynonna's sister, Waverly Earp. Nicole Haught, a Purgatory Sheriff's Deputy and Waverly's girlfriend, assists the team in her local police role.

The first season centers on Wynonna fighting the revenants who kidnapped her older sister Willa from their homestead when they were girls, and the threat posed by Bobo Del Rey, leader of the local revenants. In the second season, Wynonna discovers she is pregnant, while Waverly struggles with possession by a demon and doubts about her lineage. At the same time, two sister-wife widows of the dead sheriff who cursed Wyatt Earp seek to resurrect him. In the third season, the demon Clootie is resurrected and, as he seeks to find the entrance to the Garden of Eden, the team must work to stop him and prevent the resulting apocalypse. In the fourth season, Wynonna and Nicole must figure out a way to rescue Doc and Waverly, with the help of a new friend. Once rescued, Wynonna, Doc and Waverly return to find out that they have been gone longer than expected. While Waverly tries to help Nicole get past the trauma of their time apart, Wynonna searches for Peacemaker.

== Episodes ==
Season	Episodes		Originally released	
Season	Episodes		First released	Last released
1	13		April 1, 2016	June 24, 2016
2	12		June 9, 2017	August 25, 2017
3	12		July 16, 2018	September 28, 2018
4	12	6	July 26, 2020	August 30, 2020
4	12	6	March 5, 2021	April 9, 2021

== Cast and characters ==
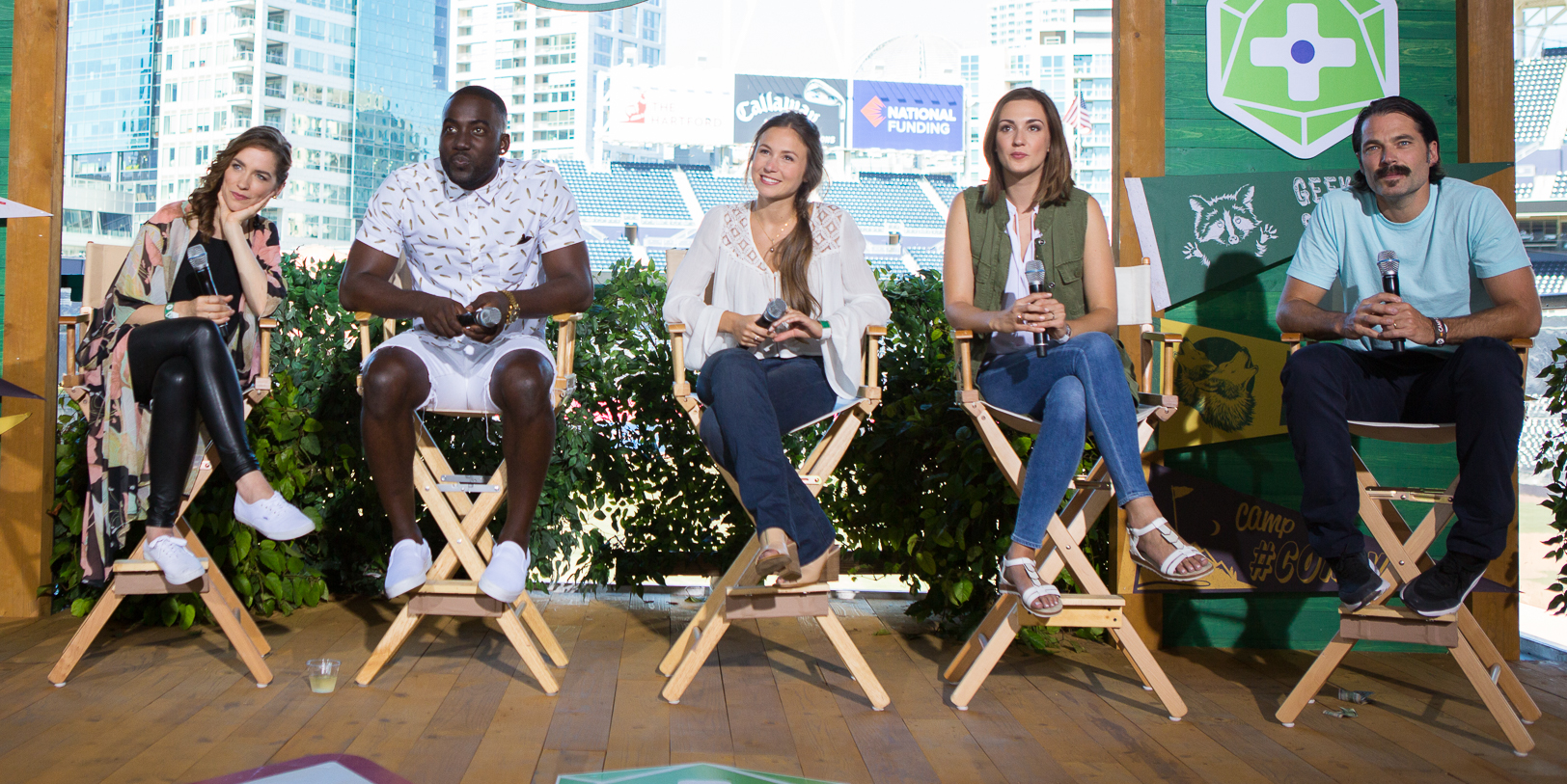
Cast at "Camp Conival" during 2016 San Diego Comic-Con. From left: Melanie Scrofano, Shamier Anderson, Dominique Provost-Chalkley, Katherine Barrell and Tim Rozon.

=== Main ===
- Melanie Scrofano as Wynonna Earp, a great-great-granddaughter of Wyatt Earp who wields the power of Wyatt's "Peacemaker" handgun, capable of killing Revenants and other supernatural beings. Cristina Merlo (season 1) and Rebecca Todd (Wynonna Earp: Vengeance) portray Wynonna during flashbacks.
- Shamier Anderson as Deputy Marshal Xavier Dolls (seasons 1–3), a special agent with the Black Badge division of the United States Marshals Service who allies with Wynonna
- Tim Rozon as Doc Holliday, Wyatt Earp's famed partner during the Old West who was cursed with eternal life when a witch cured his tuberculosis
- Dominique Provost-Chalkley as Waverly Earp, Wynonna's younger half-sister who has lived in her hometown of Purgatory her whole life. Summer McBrien portrays Waverly during flashbacks.
- Katherine Barrell as Officer Nicole Haught (seasons 3–4; recurring seasons 1–2), a deputy sheriff of Ghost River County who investigates the bizarre occurrences happening in Purgatory

=== Recurring ===
- Greg Lawson as Sheriff Randy Nedley, the sheriff of Ghost River County and Nicole's paternal figure
- Dylan Koroll as Champ Hardy (season 1), Waverly's boyfriend
- Natascha Girgis as Gus McCready (season 1), Wynonna and Waverly's aunt
- Peter Skagen as Robert "Shorty" Simons (season 1), the owner of Shorty's, a bar frequented by Wynonna
- Michael Eklund as Bobo Del Rey (seasons 1–3), born Robert Svane, he is the leader of the Revenants and a former friend of Wyatt Earp
- Rayisa Kondracki as Constance Clootie / The Stone Witch (season 1), a witch who cursed Doc Holliday with eternal life before entrapping him in a well. Jessica Sipos portrays Constance during flashbacks.
- Rachael Ancheril as Mattie Perley / The Blacksmith (season 1), a witch who assists the Earps
  - Ancheril also portrays Gretta Perley / The Iron Witch (season 2), Mattie's twin sister and a fellow witch
- Kate Drummond as Agent Jean Lucado (seasons 1–2), Dolls' superior at the Black Badge Division
- Dana Hollenbach as Chrissy Neadley (season 1; guest season 4), Randy's daughter and Waverly's friend
- Natalie Krill as Willa Earp / Eve (season 1), Wynonna and Waverly's older sister who was assumed to have been killed. Anna Quick portrays Willa during flashbacks.
- Shaun Johnston as Juan Carlo (seasons 1–2; guest season 3), Purgatory's mysterious parish priest
- Varun Saranga as Jeremy Chetri (seasons 2–4; Wynonna Earp: Vengeance), a scientist and tech expert working for the Black Badge Division
- Tamara Duarte as Rosita Bustillos (seasons 2, 4), a Revenant with advanced degrees in biochemistry and engineering
- Dani Kind as Mercedes Gardner (seasons 2–4; Wynonna Earp: Vengeance), Wynonna's rich high-school best friend and eldest of the Gardner siblings
  - Kind also portrays one of The Widows (season 2), a pair of demonic sisters who steal the faces of their victims
- Meghan Heffern as Beth Gardner (season 2), the middle Gardner sibling
  - Heffern also portrays one of The Widows (season 2)
- Caleb Ellsworth-Clark as Tucker Gardner (season 2), the youngest of the Gardner siblings and a local miscreant, who has an unhealthy obsession with Waverly
- Brendan Fehr as Ewan Allenbach (season 2), a firefighter for the Purgatory Fire Department
- Megan Follows as Michelle Gibson (season 3), the estranged mother of the Earp sisters. Brooke McCann portrays Michelle during flashbacks.
- Jean Marchand as Bulshar Clootie (season 3), a powerful demon who was sheriff of Purgatory during the Old West where he became an adversary of Wyatt Earp
- Chantel Riley as Kate / Contessa (season 3; guest season 4), the wife of Doc Holliday during the Old West who was turned into a vampire
- Justin Kelly (season 3) and Jim Watson (guest season 4) as Robin Jett, Waverly's high school friend who returns to Purgatory to help his sick father
- Zoie Palmer as Jolene (season 3; guest season 4), a demon bound to Michelle
- Sebastian Pigott as Julian / Charlie (season 3), an angel tasked with protecting the Garden of Eden. Ian Shaw portrays Julian during flashbacks.
- Martina Ortiz-Luis as Rachel Valdez (season 4), an orphaned teenager who is looked after by Nicole
- Noam Jenkins as Amon (season 4), an enigmatic demon who opens a bar for demons in Purgatory
- Ty Olsson as Sheriff Holt Clanton (season 4), the self-appointed sheriff of Purgatory and the eldest of the Clanton siblings
- Savannah Basley as Cleo Clanton (season 4), the self-appointed magistrate of Purgatory and the middle Clanton sibling
- Billy Bryk as Billy Clanton (season 4), the youngest of the Clanton siblings who befriends Rachel
- Paula Boudreau as Margo Clanton (season 4), the matriarch of the Clanton family who have despised the Earps for generations
- Karen Knox as Mina Starratt (Wynonna Earp: Vengeance), a demon from Wynonna's childhood hell-bent on seeking revenge against her
- Andrew Bushell as Lafferty (Wynonna Earp: Vengeance), a former agent with the Black Badge division who follows Wynonna and Doc to Purgatory

== Development and production ==
Syfy acquired the U.S. rights to Wynonna Earp from SEVEN24 Films and IDW Entertainment in July 2015 and placed an order for 13 episodes. International distribution of the series was acquired by Dynamic Television in September 2015. On September 30, 2015, SEVEN24 Films announced the acquisition of Canadian broadcast rights by over-the-air independent station CHCH-DT. CHCH procured the funding to broadcast Season 1 from global content investment and rights management company Motion Content Group.

Melanie Scrofano was cast in the title role, with Tim Rozon as Doc Holliday and Shamier Anderson as Agent Dolls. Dominique Provost-Chalkley was cast as Waverly Earp. In recurring roles, Michael Eklund was cast as villain Bobo Del Rey and Katherine Barrell as Officer Nicole Haught.

"Tell That Devil" by singer-songwriter Jill Andrews was selected as the theme music for the series. The titles of Wynonna Earp episodes are based on country-and-western songs.

Viacom International Media Networks acquired the rights to broadcast Wynonna Earp on its multinational Spike channels in July 2016. In March 2017, Bell Media announced the new partnership between Space and SEVEN24 Films as Canadian co-producers of the series. In 2019, Cineflix Studios joined the series as a co-producer and Cineflix Rights became the international rights agent for all seasons of Wynonna Earp. Later that year, in September, Space Channel became the CTV Sci-Fi Channel.

=== Season 1 ===
Filming of Season 1 took place from September 14, 2015, to February 12, 2016 in Calgary, Alberta. Locations included Bridgeland, Inglewood, and Heritage Park. Didsbury, Alberta was used as the setting for the series' small town of Purgatory.

Syfy released the first promotional images and synopsis for the series on November 6, 2015. The teaser trailer was released through IGN in January 2016.

Wynonna Earp premiered on April 1, 2016, on Syfy; and on April 4, 2016, on CHCH-DT.

=== Season 2 ===
On July 23, 2016, the renewal for a second season was announced at the Wynonna Earp panel at San Diego Comic-Con. In Canada, Wynonna Earp moved from CHCH-DT to Space effective April 15, 2017. In anticipation of the premiere of Season 2, Space began airing Season 1 on the same date with a special double-episode series debut.

After the series was renewed for a second season, Melanie Scrofano found out that she was pregnant. Emily Andras decided to incorporate her pregnancy in the arc of the titular character, she informed IDW Entertainment of the prospective plot, and Syfy added two more episodes, increasing Season 2 from 10 to 12 episodes.

Season 2 began filming in Calgary and surrounding areas from December 12, 2016, to April 13, 2017. Additional location shooting took place in Springbank, Alberta. The recurring cast was joined by Varun Saranga in the role of Jeremy Chetri and Tamara Duarte as Rosita.

The 'sneak peek' of the teaser trailer for the new season was released on April 1, 2017, and the trailer released officially by IGN on May 19, 2017. Syfy released the poster for the season on May 24, 2017.

Season 2 premiered on June 9, 2017, on Syfy and Space.

=== Season 3 ===
On July 22, 2017, David Ozer, president of IDW Entertainment, announced at the show's SDCC panel that the series had been renewed for a third season with the premiere scheduled for 2018. Space announced on the same day that it had ordered 12 episodes for a third season, together with Syfy. Andras credited Wynonna Earp's passionate fan base (nicknamed "Earpers") with gaining the renewal.

Filming of Season 3 began January 15, 2018 and ended on May 7, 2018. On February 5, 2018, the series announced the casting of Megan Follows in the role of Michelle Earp, the mother of Wynonna Earp.

In March 2018, Syfy and Space announced that Zoie Palmer had joined the series as a guest star in the role of Jolene; followed by the announcement that Chantel Riley had been cast in the recurring role of a bounty hunter character named Kate. Bell Media announced on April 24 that musician Jann Arden had joined the cast as Bunny Loblaw, a member of Purgatory's town council.

The key art for the season was released on June 5, 2018, along with photos of the cast. Syfy's trailer for the third season was released on June 8, 2018. Space released its trailer on June 15, 2018. The episode titles were released on June 19, 2018.

Season 3 premiered on July 20, 2018, on Syfy and Space. The first episode of the season was released as a special broadcast by Syfy on July 16, 2018, at 11 p.m. Eastern, in advance of the season premiere.

=== Season 4 ===
On July 21, 2018, the renewal by Syfy and Space (rebranded as CTV Sci-Fi Channel in 2019) for a fourth season was announced at SDCC. The season was scheduled to premiere in 2019 and comprise 12 episodes.

In late February 2019, news broke that the start of production on the fourth season had been delayed due to financial problems at IDW Entertainment. On July 2, 2019, it was announced that production would begin in late 2019 and filming starting January 2020, with Cineflix Studios as co-producer, and Canada's Crave network as a new production partner. Emily Andras thanked fans of Wynonna Earp for their loyalty, "This is an enormous testament to our passionate and fierce fans, the Earpers, who remind us every day how to fight like hell for the things you love with wit, ferocity and kindness." Andras and cast were slated to appear at the 2019 San Diego Comic-Con.

Filming for Season 4 began in Calgary on January 15, 2020. New cast joining the series in the fourth season include Martina Ortiz-Luis as Rachel, Andrew Phung, and Ty Olsson. Production was temporarily suspended on March 16 after Alberta issued a provincial order to stop all television and film productions due to concerns over the spread of coronavirus in the region and Canada.

The trailer for the fourth season was released on June 26, 2020. The key art for the new season was decided in a Syfy fan contest held in June 2020, with Emily Andras selecting the winning design announced on July 17, 2020.

On June 26, 2020, the series and Bell Media announced the premiere of the first six episodes of Season 4 on July 26. Filming on the remaining episodes resumed on July 16, 2020.

On February 5, 2021, SyFy announced that it had cancelled the series, with the second half of the season returning on March 5. In her statement about the decision, Emily Andras said, "I have been honored to tell Wynonna and her family's story, and along with Seven24, Cineflix and CTV Sci-Fi, are hopeful we can continue to share their inspiring tales in the future." Eric Volmers of the Calgary Herald reported that Seven24 Films was "in discussions with American broadcasters" and hoped to "keep this remarkable show going".

== Release ==
=== Broadcast ===
Viacom International Media Networks acquired the rights to broadcast Wynonna Earp on its multinational Spike channels in July 2016. Wynonna Earp premiered in the United Kingdom on Spike on July 29, 2016, at 9:00 p.m. The series premiered in Australia on Spike on February 5, 2017.

In the UK, Season 2 premiered on Spike on June 13, 2017, at 10:00 p.m. Season 3 premiered on 5Spike on July 27, 2018, at 10:00 p.m.

The series was distributed internationally on Netflix until 2020. Netflix in the United States carried the show from 2017 through 2025.

=== Home media ===
Wynonna Earp became available on Amazon Video as video on demand on May 6, 2016.

In December 2016, SEVEN24 Films producer Jordy Randall announced in an interview with the Calgary Herald that Season 1 would be streaming on Netflix. The series became available on Netflix in the United States on April 1, 2017; and in Canada on April 5, 2017.

The Season 1 DVD for Region 4 and Blu-ray for Region B were released first in Australia by Roadshow Entertainment on May 3, 2017.

The Season 2 DVD was released in Region 4 and the Blu-ray in Region B by Roadshow Entertainment on November 1, 2017.

A crowdfunding campaign for a region free Blu-ray release was launched on May 23, 2017, by IDW Entertainment on Indiegogo.

== Reception ==
In the United States, season 1 averaged a total rating of 0.13 with 0.56 million viewers. The season received a 79% approval rating on Rotten Tomatoes, based on 14 reviews, with an average rating of 6.11/10. The critical consensus states: "What Wynonna Earp lacks in originality it more than makes up for in gritty, silly, supernatural fun." Metacritic gave it an average score of 68 out of 100.

Season 2 averaged a 0.12 rating in the U.S. with 0.50 million viewers. Viewership among women aged 18–34 increased 44 percent, representing more than half of Wynonna Earp's audience. The season received a 100% approval rating on Rotten Tomatoes based on 15 reviews, with an average rating of 8.33/10. The critical consensus states: "Wynonna Earp ups the ante with more action, more surprises, and more Melanie Scrofano as the titular sharp-tongued gunslinger."

In the U.S., season 3 averaged a rating of 0.11 with 0.47 million viewers. The season received a 100% approval rating on Rotten Tomatoes based on 14 reviews, with an average rating of 8.1/10. The critical consensus states: "Wynonna's back, action-packed, and dressed in black in the dynamic third season of Wynonna Earp."

In Canada, overall viewership increased 52% on Space compared to season 1 on CHCH-DT. Viewership of season 2 increased 30% compared to the first season, and made Space "the most-watched entertainment specialty channel" during the program's time slot.

In its new series review, Collider gave Wynonna Earp four stars, calling it "a fresh and familiar take on zombies, the Wild West, and gunslinger culture" and "something that also feels different to anything we're seeing on TV currently, thanks not only to its setting, but its prominent placement of so many strong, profane, kickass female characters." Digital Journal said the series was "smart" and "complex" with "a lot going for it". The A.V. Club called Melanie Scrofano "the right woman for the job ... an easy, authoritative presence"; and "when it's allowed the room to run, Wynonna Earp delights in itself," adding that the series "could grow into the good-time Western pulp it has the potential to be." In a post-season 1 review for Salon, Melanie McFarland wrote: "This modern Western proved its mettle by dint of unexpectedly weird plotting and witty dialogue ... [Melanie] Scrofano lends a hardened and slightly feral swagger to Wynonna that's vastly entertaining ... Much of the show's winning spirit rests in its exploration of family loyalty and the popular conviction that one's blood and dynastic ties compel one to fulfill a prescribed destiny."

E! Entertainment Television named Wynonna Earp the "Best New Show" of 2016. It was chosen by Variety as one of the 20 best new series of 2016, stating "what this prairie-set Canadian import lacks in budget, it makes up for in gumption, sass and camaraderie." In its annual "Best of TV" highlight, Collider named Wynonna Earp the "Best New Sci-Fi" show of 2016.

Maureen Ryan of Variety named Wynonna Earp one of the best television shows of 2017, praising its "fierce and committed performances". The New York Times recommended Wynonna Earp as one of the television series to stream on Netflix, describing it as "internal mythology [that] can be a little too involved, but the characters' motivations are always clear, and the snarky dialogue is fun".

"Wayhaught", the portmanteau for the relationship between Waverly Earp and Nicole Haught, was considered one of the favorite 2017 fan "ships" on Tumblr, and the series was praised for how it is portrayed and acknowledged by Dominique Provost-Chalkley and Katherine Barrell.

=== LGBTQ+ representation ===
The show aired in 2016 during a hostile television environment for the LGBTQ+ community. Queer characters were often killed off, accumulating more than 25 queer women dying on "scripted TV and streaming shows in that year alone". Emily Andras, the showrunner, made a promise early on that the queer characters in Wynonna Earp would survive. In the Season 1 finale, the harmful "Bury Your Gays" trope was challenged when Nicole survives being shot due to wearing a bulletproof vest. Many actors and creators of the show have expressed how the fandom's support shows just how important representation is, with Katherine Barrell saying, "WayHaught was one of the first, I think, examples in pop culture of how powerful a fandom can be when they finally see themselves onscreen" and Emily Andras saying, "It's when you take a community of people that don't feel represented in a way that makes their hearts happy, and makes them feel seen, and makes them feel loved, and included, and accepted, and celebrated, but when you do that you can create things like this. You can move mountains. And I think that's the power of WayHaught."

The show has earned three GLAAD Media Award nominations for their positive queer representation.

=== Feminist representation ===
According to Kat Jetson of The Hollywood Reporter, Wynonna Earp deals with many feminist themes throughout the series and highlights strong female characters who are not defined by their relationship to men. A notable episode called "Everybody Knows" engages in positive discourse on the topic of women's sexuality and dismantles ideas of shaming women for being sex positive while Wynonna tries to figure out the identity of her baby's father. Another form of female empowerment is found through the storyline of Wynonna's pregnancy that was added to the plot due to the unexpected pregnancy of its lead actress, Melanie Scrofano. The series' showrunner Emily Andras made it a point to incorporate Melanie's pregnancy into the show rather than hide it. Andras discusses the importance of this storyline by saying, "I think that's a story that doesn't always get told. This isn't necessarily a woman in a monogamous [situation]. It's a woman who lives a certain lifestyle, unapologetically, who has now found herself pregnant."

=== Media information ===
Wynonna Earp producers and cast members appeared at the Calgary International Film Festival on September 30, 2017, in a special program showcasing film and television productions in Alberta, Canada. The event was live-streamed and featured behind-the-scenes stories, insights, and a Q&A session.

=== Awards and nominations ===
==== Aurora Awards ====
Year	Category	Nominee	Result	Ref
2018	Best Visual Presentation – Wynonna Earp Season 2	Emily Andras and Brad Wright	Nominated	

==== Canadian Screen Awards ====
Year	Category	Nominee	Result	Ref
2017	Best Writing in a Dramatic Series	Emily Andras (episode: "Purgatory") (Channel (Broadcaster): CHCH (Channel Zero))	Nominated	
2017	Best Achievement in Make-Up	Joanne Jacobsen, Jo-Dee Thomson (episode: "Diggin' Up Bones")	Nominated	
2017	Best Costume Design	Jennifer Haffenden (episode: "Keep the Home Fires Burning")	Nominated	
2017	Best Original Music Score for a Series	Robert Carli and Peter Chapman (episode: "House of Memories")	Nominated	
2017	Best Visual Effects	Geoff Scott, William Garrett, Sarah Wormsbecher, Eric Doiron, Nathan Larouche, Anthony DeChellis, Lon Molnar (episode: "I Walk the Line")	Nominated	
2017	Best Cross-Platform Project – Fiction (Digital Media)	Wynonna Earp Interactive, Daniel Dales, Jarrett Sherman, Alex Lalonde, Jordy Randall, Emily Andras (Production Company: Digital Howard Inc.)	Won	
2018	Best Writing, Drama Series	Emily Andras (episode: "I Hope You Dance") (Channel (Broadcaster): Space (Bell Media))	Nominated	
2018	Best Cross-Platform Project, Fiction	Wynonna Earp Digital, Daniel Dales, Jarrett Sherman, Alex Lalonde, Emily Andras, Jordy Randall, Tom Cox, Christin Hanly (Production Company: Digital Howard Inc.)	Won	
2019	Best Lead Actress, Drama Series	Melanie Scrofano	Nominated	
2019	Best Photography, Drama	Gavin Smith (episode: "Undo It")	Nominated	
2019	Best Sound, Fiction	Mark Shnuriwsky, Janice Ierulli, Matthew Hussey, Sid Lieberman, Michael Markiw, Mike Woroniuk, Paul Shubat (episode: "War Paint")	Nominated	
2019	Best Production Design or Art Direction, Fiction	Ingrid Jurek, Cathy Cowan, Amber Humphries (episode: "Daddy Lessons")	Nominated	
2019	Best Costume Design	Jennifer Haffenden (episode: "War Paint")	Nominated	
2019	Best Visual Effects	Lon Molnar, Giancarlo Derchie, Mike Duffy, Che Spencer, Anthony De Chellis, Mike Kwan, Frank Calero, Michael Enzbrunner, Parastu Rezaie, Mark Ferguson (episode: "War Paint")	Nominated	
2019	Best Achievement in Hair	Jo-Dee Thomson (episode: "Blood Red and Going Down")	Nominated	
2019	Best Achievement in Make-Up	Joanne Jacobsen (episode: "War Paint")	Won	

==== Dragon Awards ====
Year	Category	Nominee	Result	Ref
2017	Best Science Fiction or Fantasy TV Series	Wynonna Earp	Nominated	

==== GLAAD Media Award ====
Year	Category	Nominee	Result	Ref
2017	Outstanding Drama Series	Wynonna Earp	Nominated	
2019	Outstanding Drama Series	Wynonna Earp	Nominated	
2021	Outstanding Drama Series	Wynonna Earp	Nominated	

==== People's Choice Awards ====
Year	Category	Nominee	Result	Ref
2018	Sci-Fi/Fantasy Show of 2018	Wynonna Earp	Won	
2020	Sci-Fi/Fantasy Show of 2020	Wynonna Earp	Won	

==== Rockie Awards ====
Year	Category	Nominee	Result	Ref
2017	Sci-Fi, Fantasy and Action	Wynonna Earp	Nominated	

==== Rosie Awards ====
Year	Category	Nominee	Result	Ref
2017	Best Dramatic Series	Tom Cox and Jordy Randall, Producers, SEVEN24 Films	Won	
2017	Best Performance by an Alberta Actor	Peter Skagen (episode: "Leavin On Your Mind")	Nominated	
2017	Best Performance by an Alberta Actor	Shaun Johnston (episode: "Landslide")	Nominated	
2017	Best Overall Sound (Drama Over 30 Minutes)	Michael Playfair, Robert "Arjay" Joly, Steve Forst, & Paul Shubat (episode: "I Walk the Line")	Nominated	
2017	Best Production Designer/Art Director	Trevor Smith (episode: "Two-Faced Jack")	Nominated	
2017	Best Costume Designer	Jennifer Haffenden (episode: "She Wouldn't Be Gone")	Nominated	
2017	Best Make-Up & Hair Artist(s)	Joanne Jacobsen, Jo-Dee Thomson, Gunther Schetterer & Linda Nelson (episode:"Diggin Up Bones")	Nominated	

==== WGC Screenwriting Awards ====
Year	Category	Nominee	Result	Ref
2017	Best Script from a Rookie Series	Alexandra Zarowny (episode: "Bury Me With My Guns On")	Won	

=== Contests ===
==== Canadian Screen Awards: Audience Award ====
Year	Category	Nominee	Result	Ref
2019	Cogeco Fund Audience Choice Award	Dominique Provost-Chalkley	Won	
2020	Cogeco Fund Audience Choice Award	Katherine Barrell	Won	
2021	Cogeco Fund Audience Choice Award	Melanie Scrofano	Won	

==== E! Online ====
Year	Category	Nominee	Result	Ref
2017	Girl on Top	Melanie Scrofano	Won	
2018	TV's Top Leading Lady	Melanie Scrofano	Won	

=== Popularity ===
Wynonna Earp's fan base is credited with increasing the series' presence on social media and benefitting Syfy's "It's a Fan Thing" marketing campaign for niche audiences.

In response to reportage that season 4 was jeopardized due to financial complications on the part of IDW, dedicated fans began a social media campaign to save the series, including electronic billboards in Times Square promoting Wynonna Earp. In appreciation of their campaign, Melanie Scrofano sponsored a billboard thanking fans for their support.

== See also ==
- Ghost Town
- Jonah Hex
- Weird West
- List of English-language Canadian television series
- List of science fiction TV and radio shows produced in Canada
- List of fantasy television programs
- List of dramatic television series with LGBT characters: 2010s
- List of LGBT characters in television and radio
