= Cobb: Off the Leash =

Cobb: Off The Leash

Publication information
- Publisher: IDW Publishing
- Schedule: Monthly
- Format: Limited series
- Publication date: May 2006 - July 2006
- No. of issues: 3

Creative team
- Created by: Beau Smith & Eduardo Barreto
- Written by: Beau Smith
- Artist(s): Eduardo Barreto
- Colorist(s): Josh Burcham

Cobb: Off The Leash is a three-issue comic book mini-series created by Beau Smith and Eduardo Barreto, published by IDW Publishing in 2006. The eponymous protagonist, Frank Cobb, is an original creation for this mini-series.

== Plot summary ==
In the story, Frank Cobb is a former Secret Service agent who is lacking in direction as well as an outlet for his protective instincts. After an innocent is threatened, he has a violent confrontation with the aggressors and ends up in a jail cell. Soon, he is given a chance to forge a new direction. This new direction puts him in direct conflict with secret agents, members of the Mafia, and terrorists. Also involved in the story are old friends and beautiful women.
