= Frank Cobb =

Publication information
- Publisher: IDW Publishing
- First appearance: Cobb: Off the Leash # 1 (March 2006)
- Created by: Beau Smith; Eduardo Barreto

In-story information
- Alter ego: Frank Cobb
- Team affiliations: Secret Service (former member)
- Abilities: Tactical Mind; Honed Fighting Skills

Frank Cobb is the title character of a three issue comic book limited series titled Cobb: Off the Leash, published by IDW Publishing. This character was created by Beau Smith and Eduardo Barreto, with colors by Josh Burcham. The character is an original creation for this mini-series.

== Plot summary ==
Frank Cobb is a former secret service agent who lacks both direction and an outlet for his protective instincts. After an innocent is threatened and he has a violent confrontation with the aggressors, he ends up in a jail cell and is soon given a chance to forge a new direction. This new direction puts him in direct conflict with secret agents, members of the mafia, terrorists. Also involved in the story are old friends and beautiful women.
