= Shamier Anderson =

Canadian actor (born 1991)

- Anderson in 2026
- Born: May 6, 1991 (age 35); Toronto, Ontario, Canada
- Occupation: Actor
- Years active: 2009–present
- Relatives: Stephan James (brother)

Shamier Anderson (born May 6, 1991) is a Canadian actor. He is known for his roles in the television series Wynonna Earp, as U.S. Deputy Marshal Xavier Dolls, Invasion, as Trevante Cole, and as Mr. Nobody in the action film John Wick: Chapter 4 (2023).

== Background ==
Anderson is the older brother of actor Stephan James. He graduated from Wexford Collegiate School for the Arts as an Ontario Scholar, then went on to study criminology and trained with weapons prior to breaking into acting. He has training in martial arts Wing Chun Kung Fu.

He started his film career in 2010.

== Personal life ==
As of July 2020, Shamier Anderson lives in Los Angeles, California.

== Filmography ==
Key
†	Denotes productions that have not yet been released

=== Film ===
Year	Title	Role	Notes
2010	Nostrum	R.I.P.	
2012	The Barrens	Dave	
2015	Bravetown	Brandon	
2015	Across the Line	Carter Slaughter	
2016	Race	Eulace Peacock	
2018	Love Jacked	Malcolm	
2018	Destroyer	Antonio	
2018	City of Lies	David "D. Mack" Mack	
2019	Endings, Beginnings	Jonathan	
2020	Son of the South	Reggie	
2020	Bruised	Immaculate	
2021	Stowaway	Michael Adams	
2021	Awake	Dodge	
2023	John Wick: Chapter 4	Tracker / Mr. Nobody	
2024	The Luckiest Man in America	Chuck	
2025	Tin Soldier	Kivon Jackson	

=== Television ===
Year	Title	Role	Notes
2010	Overruled!	Ed	Recurring role (season 3)
2010	Camp Rock 2: The Final Jam	Camp Star dancer	TV movie
2011	Sharpay's Fabulous Adventure	Lead dancer	TV movie
2011	Desperately Seeking Santa	Hipster Jeremy	TV movie
2011	Todd and the Book of Pure Evil	Lon	Episode: "Loser Generated Content"
2011	Skins	Warren	Episodes: "Daisy", "Michelle"
2011	King	Duncan	Episode: "Farah Elliott"
2011	Degrassi: The Next Generation	Thug	Episode: "Idioteque"
2012	Lost Girl	Evan	Episode: "School's Out"
2012	Saving Hope	Isaac Wolfe	Episode: "Blindness"
2012	Rookie Blue	Curtis Payne	Episode: "The Rules"
2013	Played	Adam "Monk" Williams	Episode: "Guns"
2013–2014	The Next Step	Chris	Main cast
2014	The Tomorrow People	Mike	Episode: "The Citadel"
2014	Intruders	Young Gary Fischer	Episode: "She Was Provisional"
2014	Defiance	Crisp / Pvt. Crisp	4 episodes
2014	Not With My Daughter	Police officer #1	TV movie
2015	Constantine	Adam	Episode: "A Whole World Out There"
2016	Slasher	Caleb	Episode: "Digging Your Grave With Your Teeth"
2016	Killjoys	Arune Hyponia	Episode: "Full Metal Monk"
2016	Pitch	Trevor Davis	Episode: "Beanball"
2016–2018	Wynonna Earp	Xavier Dolls	Main cast (seasons 1–3)
2017	Trailer Park Boys	Sammy O.G.	2 episodes
2017	Shots Fired	Maceo Terry	3 episodes
2018	Dear White People	Trevor King	Episode: "Volume 2: Chapter V"
2019	Goliath	Anton/Dario Blackwood	Main cast (season 3)
2020	Soulmates	Adam	Episode: "Little Adventures"
2021–present	Invasion	Trevante Cole	Main cast
2026	The Legacy Lounge	Host	4 episodes; also creators and executive producer
