= Spike (Australia) =

Australian pay television channel owned by Paramount Global

- Spike Logo used from 2016 to 2022
- Country: Australia

Programming
- Language(s): English
- Picture format: 720p HDTV

Ownership
- Owner: ViacomCBS Networks UK & Australia

History
- Launched: 1 July 2016
- Closed: 27 February 2022

Spike was an Australian pay television channel owned by ViacomCBS Networks UK & Australia. It launched on 1 July 2016 on Fetch TV and was exclusive to that service. A localised version of the U.S. channel of the same name, it primarily aired entertainment programming geared towards a male audience, including import dramas, programming from its former U.S. counterpart, and mixed martial arts.

On 15 February 2018, Spike was made available in HD.

The channel was closed on 27 February 2022 with no replacement; most of its programming had already transitioned and moved to the domestic version of Paramount+ in the months prior.
