= Beau Smith =

American comic book writer

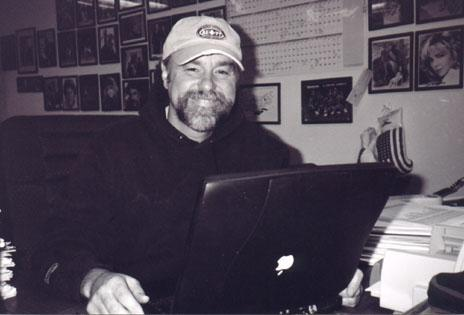
- Born: Stephen Scott Beau Smith; December 17, 1954 (age 71) Huntington, West Virginia
- Area: Writer
- Notable works: Guy Gardner: Warrior; Batman vs. Wildcat; Catwoman vs. Wildcat; Cobb: Off The Leash; Wynonna Earp: Home On The Strange
- Awards: Inkpot Award (2023).

Beau Smith (born December 17, 1954, in Huntington, West Virginia) is an American comic book writer and columnist, best known for his work for DC Comics, Image Comics, IDW Publishing and as vice president of marketing for Eclipse Comics.

== Career ==
=== Early career ===
A lifelong resident of West Virginia, Smith is a graduate of Marshall University in journalism. Smith got his start in the comics field as a letterhack, having written over 400 letters to various comics, and actually was solicited to send letters based on early preview copies. Smith's first professional comics writing job was with Pacific Comics, but the company went out of business prior to publishing the story.

=== Eclipse Comics ===
Beau Smith's first published work was for Eclipse Comics in 1985, a series of one- to two-page backup features in the Scout comic (created by fellow West Virginia native Timothy Truman). This was followed by a collaboration titled "The Dogs of Danger" with Flint Henry in the title The Swords of Texas. The next feature for Eclipse was a character called Beau LaDuke, the character bearing a striking resemblance to Beau Smith himself. The Beau LaDuke character had a backup feature in Scout: War Shaman #13-#16. Smith's next work was a collaboration with Chuck Dixon on a revival of The Black Terror in a crime noir tale. This is the first of many collaborations with Chuck Dixon, who would partner with Smith to write stories for DC Comics in the future.

=== DC Comics ===
Smith's first published work for DC was in Green Lantern Quarterly #8. Smith's first full length story for DC was Guy Gardner: Warrior #20, which was the conclusion of the "Emerald Fallout" story, a follow-up to the "Emerald Twilight" storyline which removed Hal Jordan from the role of Green Lantern. Smith had the challenge of developing a new direction for Guy Gardner not including the use of a power ring, part of his mythos from the creation of the character:

My plan was to make Guy Gardner an Indiana Jones kinda' hero. No super powers. He would depend on his own manly personality and guts. He's a man that has seen it all and knows how to handle that dangerous situation when it came up.

Smith was editorially mandated to give morphing powers to Guy Gardner. The writer had very specific limits for the powers in mind, in the writer's own words "Saddled with this morphin' stuff I made it that Guy could only morph the weapons of the greatest warriors of the universe. I figured that would narrow it down to spears, knives, swords, guns... and so on." These limits were not universally adopted. "I open up these other books and these jokers have Guy morphin' chain saws, egg beaters and everything short of a dildo."

=== IDW ===
Beau Smith served as IDW's vice president of sales and marketing until February 1 of 2005, but has continued to write comics for the publisher. His original creations include Wynonna Earp, a modern day descendant of Wyatt Earp, and Frank Cobb, a former Secret Service agent with a lack of direction and a strong drive to protect innocents. IDW published the complete Wynonna Earp trade, collecting all previous appearances in a single volume. In 2006 Cobb: Off the Leash was awarded the #3 position on Scoop's top ten comics of 2006. Cobb: Off the Leash was also reprinted in a magazine format collected edition in 2007. In February 2008, IDW released the Smith-penned original story set in the 24 mythology entitled 24: Cold Warriors.

=== Other work ===
Smith has maintained a regular opinion column at Comics Bulletin titled "Busted Knuckles". Features of the column include the "Busted Knuckles Babe of the Week" and the "Manly Comic Cover" of the week, the latter of which is the subject of a good-natured rivalry for the manliest cover with Chuck Dixon's website www.Dixonverse.net. Smith has also maintained a long term How-To column about the comic business in Sketch Magazine, entitled "From the Ranch". Those columns were collected in 2007 for a book entitled Beau Smith's No Guts, No Glory: How To Market Yourself In Comics. Smith has also written business columns for Westfield Comics, Entertainment Retailer, Wizard, Comic Book Business, Comics & Games Retailer, and The Comics Buyer's Guide.

Smith ventured into writing video games for such titles as Maximo: Beauty Is Only Sword Deep from Dreamwave Studios, and Maximo vs. Army of Zin from Capcom Video Games.

== Bibliography ==
=== DC ===
- Green Lantern Corps Quarterly #8
- Guy Gardner: Warrior #0, #20-#44, Annual #1-#2
- Showcase '95 #6
- Showcase '96 #1,#11
- Wildcat vs. Batman #1-#4 (w/ Chuck Dixon)
- Wildcat vs. Catwoman #1-#4 (w/ Chuck Dixon)
- Green Lantern 80-Page Giant #1
- 9-11: The World's Finest Comic Book Writers & Artists Tell Stories to Remember #[2] "Soldiers"

=== Eclipse ===
- The Black Terror 1-4 (co-written w/Chuck Dixon)
- Tales Of Terror
- Alien Worlds
- Parts Unknown
- Wynonna Earp
- Scout 14,16,18,22 (backup story)
- Scout: War Shaman 13-16 (backup story)
- The Swords of Texas 1-4 (backup story)

=== IDW ===
- Wynonna Earp: Home On The Strange
- Cobb: Off the Leash
- 24: Cold Warriors #1

=== Image ===
- Wynonna Earp
- Parts Unknown
- Spawn
- Spawn The Undead
- Viking Spawn: Special Fan Edition
- ShadowHawk
- The Berzerkers
- Primate: The Sword Of Darwin
- The Tenth
- Boof
- Boof and The Bruise Crew
- Total Eclipse
- Angela Special
- Angela Trade Paperback

=== Other publishers ===
- AC Comics - Good Girl Art Quarterly #12
- Dark Horse - Dark Horse Presents #136
- Chaos! Comics/Wizard - Undertaker #0, 9
- Crusade/Marvel - Shi: Dark Night of Judgement (w/ Billy Tucci)
- Marvel/Crusade - Wolverine: Judgement Night (w/ Billy Tucci)
- Dark Horse - Star Wars Tales #7
- Axis Comics - Deathgrip

== Awards ==
In 2023, Smith was a recipient of the Inkpot Award at the annual San Diego Comic Con.
