= Melanie Scrofano =

Canadian actress

- Scrofano at Dragon Con in 2026
- Born: December 20, 1981 (age 44); Ottawa, Ontario, Canada
- Occupation: Actress
- Years active: 2002–present
- Spouse: Jeff Pentecost
- Children: 2

Melanie Neige Scrofano (born December 20, 1981) is a Canadian actress. She is known for playing Mrs. McMurray on the Crave comedy series Letterkenny, Rebecca on the CBC comedy-drama series Being Erica, October on the Showcase mockumentary series Pure Pwnage, and Tia on the CTV fantasy-drama series The Listener. From 2016 to 2021, Scrofano starred as the title character on the Syfy modern Western drama Wynonna Earp. In 2019, she played Emilie in the comedy horror film Ready or Not. Since 2022, she has played the recurring role of Captain Marie Batel in Star Trek: Strange New Worlds.

== Early life ==
Scrofano was born in Ottawa, Ontario, the daughter of a government worker mother and an engineer father. She is of French-Canadian and Italian descent. She began modeling at the age of 13, and picked up acting when her agent began submitting her for acting jobs.

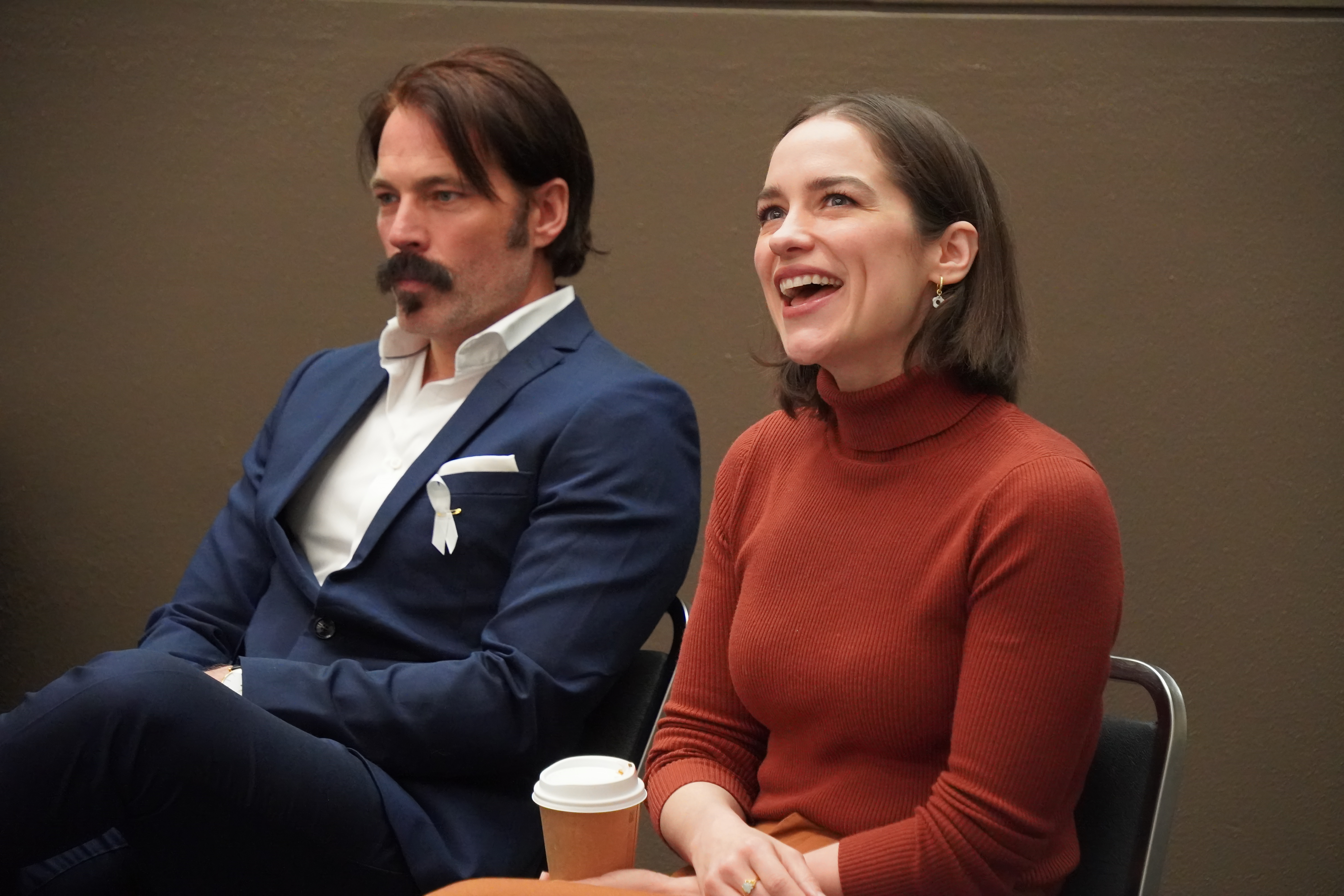
Tim Rozon and Scrofano at Galaxy Con Richmond 2023

== Personal life ==
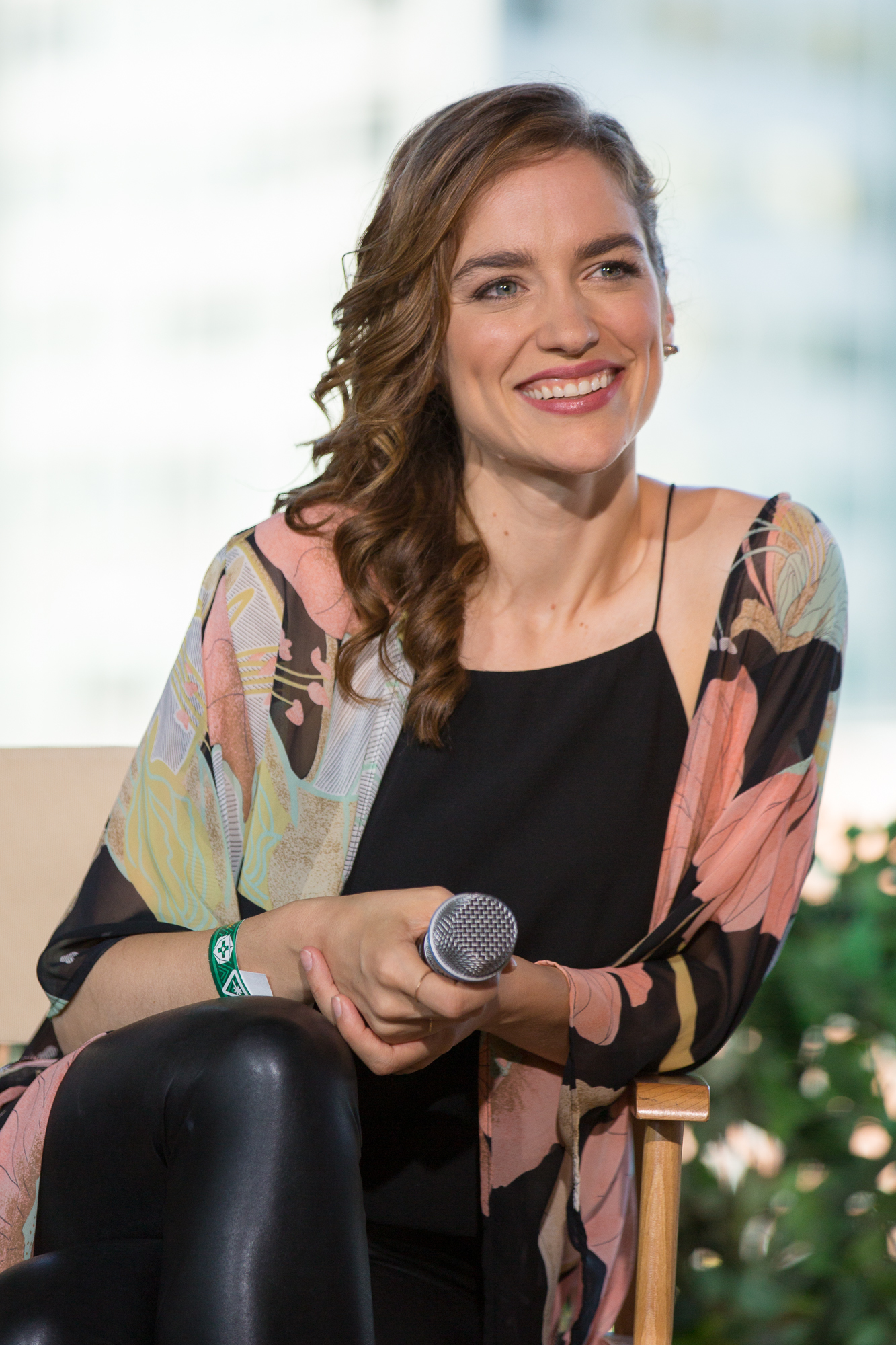
Melanie Scrofano in July 2016

Scrofano and her husband Jeff have two sons. It was revealed in a July 2017 Variety article that Scrofano was pregnant for the duration of filming the second season of Wynonna Earp. She gave birth to a son in April 2017, shortly after production on the season had wrapped.

== Filmography ==
=== Film ===
| Year | Title | Role | Notes |
|---|---|---|---|
| 2008 | Baby Blues | Mani White | |
| 2009 | A Good Meal | Nancy | |
| 2009 | Saw VI | Gena | |
| 2011 | Citizen Gangster | Ann Roberts | |
| 2012 | The Conspiracy | Sarah | |
| 2013 | Nurse 3D | Rachel Adams | |
| 2014 | Wolves | Gail Timmins | |
| 2014 | RoboCop | Wife of Man with Prosthetics | |
| 2015 | A Sunday Kind of Love | Emma / Death | |
| 2015 | Mangiacake | Tessa | |
| 2018 | Birdland | Merle James | |
| 2019 | Ready or Not | Emilie | |
| 2019 | Unidentified Woman | Dawn Sullivan | Short film |
| 2020 | The Silencing | Debbie | |
| 2022 | Welcome to Mama's | Amy | |
| 2022 | The End of Sex | Wendy | |
| 2024 | Wynonna Earp: Vengeance | Wynonna Earp | |

=== Television ===
| Year | Title | Role | Notes |
|---|---|---|---|
| 2002 | Undressed | Isobel | unknown episodes (season 6) |
| 2003 | Mob Stories | Menard's Girlfriend | Episode: "Don of St. Leonard" |
| 2004 | Naked Josh | Marla | Episode: "Family Misgivings" |
| 2006 | Beautiful People | Emma Lovren | Episodes: "Best Face Forward", "And the Winner Is..." |
| 2006–2007 | Jeff Ltd. | Nathalie | 4 episodes |
| 2007 | Supernatural | Near-Dead Girl | Episode: "What Is and What Should Never Be" |
| 2008 | Anne of Green Gables: A New Beginning | Brigitte | Television movie |
| 2009 | Manson | Leslie Van Houten | Television movie |
| 2010 | Kids in the Hall: Death Comes to Town | French Girl / Peg Liaro | Episode: "Who Mailed Our Mayor?" |
| 2010 | Pure Pwnage | October | Main role |
| 2010 | Covert Affairs | Jane / Woman #2 | Episode: Pilot |
| 2010 | Baxter | Ms. Mansfield | 3 episodes |
| 2010 | Being Erica | Rebecca | Recurring role, 10 episodes |
| 2011 | Mudpit | Leah | Episode: "Travellin' Band" |
| 2011 | Rookie Blue | Sophie Lewis | Episode: "The One That Got Away" |
| 2011 | Flashpoint | Holly McCord | Episode: "Grounded" |
| 2011 | Stay with Me | Alison | Television movie |
| 2012 | Haven | Noelle | Episodes: "Magic Hour: Parts 1 & 2" |
| 2012 | Saving Hope | Kym Spencer | Episode: "Contact" |
| 2012 | Warehouse 13 | Alice/Kristen | Episode: "Fractures" |
| 2012 | Heartland | Hayley Powers | Episode: "Life Is a Highway" |
| 2012–2014 | The Listener | Tia Tremblay | Recurring role (season 3); main role (seasons 4–5); 23 episodes |
| 2013 | Rewind | Jessica Knox | Television movie |
| 2013 | Degrassi: The Next Generation | Meredith Fox | Episodes: "You Oughta Know", "Everything You've Done Wrong" |
| 2015 | Gangland Undercover | Suzanna | Main role |
| 2016 | Damien | Veronica Selvaggio | Recurring role, 6 episodes |
| 2016 | Designated Survivor | Lisa Jordan | 4 episodes |
| 2016–2021 | Wynonna Earp | Wynonna Earp | Lead role; also director, episode: "Look at Them Beans" |
| 2016–2023 | Letterkenny | Mrs. McMurray | Main role (seasons 2–6, 8–11) |
| 2018 | Frankie Drake Mysteries | Jenny Shaw | Episode: "Ties that Bind" |
| 2018 | Bad Blood | Valentina Cosoleto | Main role (season 2) |
| 2021 | SurrealEstate | Harper North | Episode: "For Sale by Owner"; also director, 4 episodes |
| 2022–present | Star Trek: Strange New Worlds | Captain Marie Batel | Recurring role |
| 2025 | Revival | Dana Cypress | Main role |
| 2026 | Anna Pigeon | Bethany Lopez | Recurring role |

== Awards and nominations ==
| Year | Award | Category | Nominated Work | Result | Ref. |
|---|---|---|---|---|---|
| 2017 | E! Awards | Girl on Top | Wynonna Earp | Won | |
| 2018 | Canadian Screen Awards | Audience Choice Award | Herself | Top 3 | |
| 2019 | Canadian Screen Awards | Best Lead Actress, Drama Series | Wynonna Earp | Nominated | |
| 2020 | Canadian Screen Awards | Audience Choice Award | Herself / Wynonna Earp | Top 10 | |
| 2021 | Canadian Screen Awards | Best Lead Actress, Drama Series | Wynonna Earp | Nominated | |
| 2021 | Canadian Screen Awards | Audience Choice Award | Herself / Wynonna Earp | Won | |
| 2022 | Canadian Screen Awards | Best Lead Actress, Drama Series | Wynonna Earp | Nominated | |
