= Emily Andras =

Canadian television producer and writer

- Born: Boston, Massachusetts, USA
- Occupations: Television Screenwriter and Producer
- Years active: 1999 – present
- Known for: Wynonna Earp; Lost Girl
- Children: 2

Emily Andras is a Canadian television screenwriter, showrunner, and producer. She is known for creating the beloved cult genre television series Wynonna Earp and for serving as executive producer and showrunner of Lost Girl (seasons 3 and 4).

== Early life ==
Andras was born in Boston, Massachusetts, United States, and raised in Calgary, Alberta, Canada. She earned an English degree from Queen's University in Kingston, Ontario, Canada, and received her Bachelor of Applied Arts (Radio and Television) from the RTA School of Media at Ryerson University in Toronto, Ontario.

== Career ==
Emily Andras is the creator and showrunner of SyFy's Wynonna Earp, which ran for 4 seasons and won two E! People's Choice awards. The series was considered incredibly successful, with dedicated comic conventions, and was especially lauded in the LGBTQ+ community. Emily created the Wynonna Earp series after her work on Lost Girl, where she was a writer and consulting producer for the first two seasons, showrunner and executive producer of seasons 3 and 4, and executive consulting producer in its fifth and final season.

Prior to Lost Girl, she served on Instant Star as showrunner and executive producer, for which she began as a junior writer on the series. Prior to Wynonna Earp being greenlit, she was a writer and consulting producer on Killjoys during its development and first season.

In 2008, she was nominated for a Gemini Award for Best Writing in a Children's or Youth's Program or Series, for Instant Star episode "Like A Virgin". She was nominated in 2013 for a Canadian Screen Award (CSA) for Best Writing in a Dramatic Series for Lost Girl episode "Into the Dark". In 2017, she received a CSA for Best Cross-Platform Project – Fiction for Wynonna Earp Interactive, and was nominated for Best Writing in a Dramatic Series for Wynonna Earp episode "Purgatory". In 2018, she was nominated for a CSA for Best Writing in a Dramatic Series for Wynonna Earp episode "I Hope You Dance". In 2019, she received the WGC Showrunner Award by the Writers Guild of Canada.

Emily is known for her dialogue, extensive world building/mythology, powerful female characters, and cliff hangers. CNBC called her “a genre darling” with a “devoted following, who call themselves 'Fandras'".

== Filmography ==
=== Television ===
Year	Title	Writer	Producer	Showrunner	Notes
1997	Uh-Oh!	Yes			
2000	Our Hero	Yes			1 episode
2005–2008	Instant Star	Yes	Yes	Yes	wrote 13 episodes
2006	11 Cameras	Yes			
2008	Sophie	Yes			1 episode
2008–2009	Degrassi: The Next Generation	Yes			3 episodes
2009	St. Brigid's Medical		Yes		
2009–2010	Total Drama	Yes			2 episodes
2010	Degrassi Takes Manhattan	Yes			TV movie
2010–2015	Lost Girl	Yes	Yes	Yes	Wrote 13 episodes; showrunner seasons 3, 4
2011	King	Yes	Yes		Wrote 2 episodes
2013	Lost Girl: ConFAEdential		Yes		Showcase TV special
2013	Lost Girl: An Evening at the Clubhouse		Yes		Showcase TV special
2015	Killjoys	Yes	Yes		Wrote 2 episodes
2016–2021	Wynonna Earp	Yes	Yes	Yes	Creator; wrote 14 episodes
