= ClueJob =

Real-life escape the room game

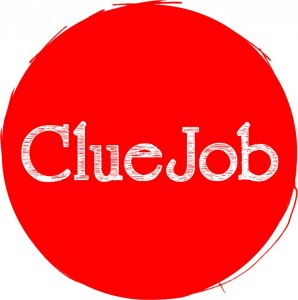
- Company type: Real-life room escape
- Industry: Entertainment
- Founded: 1 January 2015 in Cyprus
- Founder: Filios Sazeides and Panayiotis Mavrokefalos
- Headquarters: Cyprus
- Website: www.cluejob.com

ClueJob is a real-life escape the room game that was started on 1 January 2015 in Limassol, Cyprus by Filios Sazeides and Panayiotis Mavrokefalos . It was the first real-life escape the room game started in Cyprus.

== History ==
The founders Filios Sazeides and Panayiotis Mavrokefalos started ClueJob in Filios' grandmother's house. They along with the help of some of their friends started converting their grandmother's house over the space of seven years into puzzle rooms to be used for real life escape games beginning in 2014. The space opened commercially on 1 January 2015 with two different types of adventure games. In May of that year, Panayiotis Mavrokefalos was presented with a business opportunity of his own and decided to leave ClueJob.

The name of the company is derived from the famous puzzle game cluedo which was a favorite pastime of the founders of ClueJob.

== Format ==
ClueJob is a type of physical adventure game in which people are locked in a room with other participants and have to use elements of the room to solve a series of puzzles, find clues, and escape the room within a set time limit. Some games include sub-plots. The games are based on "escape the room" video games in which the player is locked inside a room and must explore their surroundings in order to escape. Players must be observant and use their critical thinking skills to escape the room. Other inspirations include adventure board games and movies. The approach to real-life escape game which ClueJob took is to have minimal rooms with a few things to interact so that people think more. Also the game-master observing the room through a cctv system could provide limited hints either shown on a screen or through a phone or by writing notes that are placed under the door.

The various ClueJob escape rooms available are-

- Chained Escape Room
- Crazy Granny Escape Room
- Hostages Escape Room
- Trapped Escape Room

== See also ==
- Real-life room escape
- ClueQuest
- Claustrophobia (escape room)
