= The Dumping Ground series 10 =

The Dumping Ground
- Series 10
- Starring: Kia Pegg; Sarah Rayson; Stacy Liu; Ruben Reuter; Carma Hylton; Jasmine Uson; Leo James; Cole Welleans-Watts; Josh Sangha; Halle Cassell; Freddy Smith; Andrea Hall; William Wyn Davies; Lara Mehmet; Massimo Cull; Florrie May Wilkinson; Owen Phillips; Hugo Nash; Zanele Nyoni; Kayleen Ngeuma
- No. of episodes: 20

Release
- Original network: CBBC
- Original release: 30 September 2022 – 23 June 2023

Series chronology
- ← Previous; Series 9 Next → Series 11

The tenth series of the British children's television series The Dumping Ground began broadcasting on 30 September 2022 on CBBC and ended on 23 June 2023. The series follows the lives of the children living in the fictional children's care home of Ashdene Ridge, nicknamed by them "The Dumping Ground". It is the 20th series in The Story of Tracy Beaker franchise (The Beaker Girls 1 having aired between this and the ninth series, and The Beaker Girls 2 airing in-between both halves)

== Cast ==
=== Main ===
- Kia Pegg as Jody Jackson (until episode 2)
- Sarah Rayson as Floss Guppy (until episode 18)
- Stacy Liu as May-Li Wang (until episode 10, guest in episode 18)
- Ruben Reuter as Finn McLaine (from episode 15)
- Carma Hylton as Candi-Rose (until episode 10)
- Jasmine Uson as Taz De Souza
- Leo James as Bird Wallis (until episode 5, guest in episode 18)
- Cole Wealleans-Watts as Jay Wallis (until episode 15, guest in episode 18)
- Josh Sangha as Sid Khan
- Halle Cassell as Clem Stephens
- Freddy Smith as Kyle Lawton
- Andrea Hall as Doreen Adebayo
- William Wyn Davies as Ben
- Lara Mehmet as Bonnie Vasiliou
- Massimo Cull as Fraser Vasiliou
- Florrie May Wilkinson as Sabrina Moxley
- Owen Phillips as Wes Oldfield
- Hugo Nash as Hugo Little
- Zanele Nyoni as Izzy Musonda (from episode 12)
- Kayleen Ngeuma as Dita Okomo (from episode 16)

=== Guest ===
- Yinka Awomi as Nana
- Kazeem Tosin Amore as Femi
- Matthew Wilson as Gary Lawton
- Charlotte Ryder as the Shop Assistant
- Ariane Barnes as Ann
- Yanick Ghanty as Dev
- Myra-Sofia Iftikhar as Sushila
- Jonathan Wolfman as the voice of Baron Soren Grimsbane
- Antoinette Tagoe as Jasmine
- Michael Greco as Adam
- Mimi Robertson as Maisie Martin
- Kat Paylor-Bent as Diane Martin
- Dolores Poretta Brown as Mrs. Potter
- Paul Copley as Jack Oldfield
- Patricia Jones as Dorothy Oldfield
- Helen Chong as Nina
- Destiny Tola Onisilé as Nicole Stephens
- Lisa Stevenson as Melanie
- Daniel Matthew Lemon as Bryce
- Jessie Williams as Lily Kettle
- Kim-Joy as Herself
- Akuc Bol as Kazima Tako
- Nelly Currant as Toni Trent
- Gwen Currant as Billie Trent
- Connor Lawson as Alex Walker
- William Talbot as Ross Sadler
- Daniel Ferris as Daniel Gizmo
- Melvin Achanzar as Melvin Ginera

== Episodes ==
No. overall	No. in series	Title	Directed by	Written by	Original release date	UK viewers (millions)
Part 1
183	1	"A Hole New Start"	Lee Skelly	Dawn Harrison	30 September 2022	N/A
During a visit to another care home the entire house suddenly collapses. Five of the home's residents are brought to the DG and they all struggle to adjust to their new surroundings, not helped by the reception the rest of the house gives them. Upon learning the news, Jody, who has recently left the DG, comes to sort out the situation. Jody is struggling to adjust to her own new life and seeks the comfort of her old home, but things take a turn when she learns she can't return. First Appearance: Andrea Hall as Doreen, William Wyn Davies as Ben, Lara Mehmet as Bonnie Vasiliou, Massimo Cull as Fraser Vasiliou, Florrie May Wilkinson as Sabrina Moxley, Owen Phillips as Wes Oldfield and Hugo Nash as Hugo Little
184	2	"Over and Out"	Lee Skelly	Dawn Harrison	7 October 2022	N/A
Four of the new arrivals run away in the night, believing they are not wanted. The kids, led by a guilt-ridden Jody, set out to find them before the care workers wake up. The runaways, meanwhile, find themselves lost in the woods and Bonnie ends up in danger. Last Appearance: Kia Pegg as Jody Jackson
185	3	"We Aren't Family"	Lee Skelly	Hannah George	14 October 2022	N/A
Feeling fed up with sharing a room with Sabrina, Taz is tasked with helping her feel more welcome at the DG but her attempts end up in disaster. Meanwhile, Clem accidentally breaks the kitchen table and tries to blame it on Bonnie and Wes's plant stand goes missing but nobody will help him find it. Absent: Freddy Smith as Kyle, William Wyn Davies as Ben and Hugo Nash as Hugo Little
186	4	"My Greatest Composition"	Lee Skelly	Thabo Mhlatshwa	21 October 2022	N/A
Bird learns that his real dad is a famous musician who is doing a gig in the area. He heads out to find him, but discovers that the situation is not entirely as he had first thought. Meanwhile, Jay tries to keep his brother's whereabouts a secret from the care workers, but more and more kids start finding out and demanding things from him in exchange for their silence. Absent: Jasmine Uson as Taz De Souza, Josh Sangha as Sid Khan, Halle Cassell as Clem Stephens, Lara Mehmet as Bonnie Vasiliou, Florrie May Wilkinson as Sabrina Moxley and Owen Phillips as Wes Oldfield
187	5	"Frogs On A Train"	Daymon Britton	Kat Rose-Martin	28 October 2022	N/A
As Bird leaves to go on tour with his dad, Jay struggles to deal with life at the DG without him. Elsewhere, Clem's obsession over her missing notebook leads to the care workers wondering if she may have ADHD, which sends her into a bigger panic over the possibility of being different. Last Appearance: Leo James as Bird Wallis
188	6	"Take Flight"	Daymon Britton	Sameera Steward	4 November 2022	N/A
Kyle's dad returns to the scene and asks him for help robbing a safe. Though he agrees to do it with the promise of them having a future together, Kyle remains conflicted about the ordeal, particularly with Hugo being so dependent on him back at the DG. Meanwhile, Jay and Bonnie become embroiled in a prank war against each other after Jay accidentally hurts Fraser. Absent: Florrie May Wilkinson as Sabrina Moxley and Owen Phillips as Wes Oldfield
189	7	"The Real Candi-Rose"	Daymon Britton	Julia Kent	11 November 2022	N/A
Candi-Rose discovers an old necklace that sends her into an identity crisis to find out who she really is. Meanwhile, Sabrina overhears Candi-Rose's real name and tries to figure out who she is, leading Floss and Taz to try to convince Sabrina that the DG is haunted by Courtney's ghost while Bonnie finds Tyler's old magic trick and decides to learn magic. Absent: Josh Sangha as Sid Khan, Freddy Smith as Kyle and Owen Phillips as Wes Oldfield
190	8	"The Dodo"	Daymon Britton	Wally Jiagoo	18 November 2022	N/A
While spending the weekend with a potential foster family, Sid learns more about his background than he'd ever known before. However, he soon realises that the family is still dealing with the loss of their son Roshan, and when they ask if he'd like to come and live with them, he has a decision to make. Meanwhile, Ben organises a ticket hunt to try and cheer the kids up, resulting in them trashing the house for what they think is a holiday abroad. Absent: Freddy Smith as Kyle and Florrie May Wilkinson as Sabrina Moxley
191	9	"Trapped"	David Innes Edwards	Paul Gerstenberger	25 November 2022	N/A
The kids notice that May-Li has been in a very bad mood recently and try to get to the bottom of what is wrong with her. When they learn that she has been offered a new job, they wonder if she's made the right choice to turn it down. Meanwhile, the ticket hunt winners try to solve an escape room together. Absent: Jasmine Uson as Taz De Souza
192	10	"The Hardest Word"	David Innes Edwards	Rachel Smith	2 December 2022	N/A
As the kids prepare to say goodbye to May-Li, Candi-Rose's world is turned upside down when her mum arrives at the DG looking for her. After Sabrina puts something on social media when she knew it was wrong. Though she initially believes her mum's claims of having changed, she quickly realises that she has lied and that the day's events mean that she will once again have to leave behind everything she has known for her own safety. Last Appearances: Stacy Liu as May-Li Wang and Carma Hylton as Candi-Rose Absent: Halle Cassell as Clem Stephens Note: Andrea Hall as Doreen Adebayo becomes a main character in this episode and Candi Rose name has changed and is moved to another care home.
Part 2
193	11	"Under New Management"	Stephanie Zari	Scott Payne	21 April 2023	N/A
The DG is unrecognisable with Doreen in charge, and Floss has had enough. She goes to war, leading a rebellion to save the DG, but, as the fallout hits, alliances begin to split.
194	12	"The Mole Hunt"	Stephanie Zari	Scott Payne	28 April 2023	N/A
Accused of betraying the rest of the DG, Floss is shunned by the other kids and sets out to make amends. Meanwhile, Taz enlists the help of new girl Izzy to deal with a mole in the garden whilst Kyle tries to get in touch with his imprisoned dad. First Appearance: Zanele Nyoni as Izzy Musonda Absent: Hugo Nash as Hugo Little
195	13	"Natural Habitat"	David Innes Edwards	Rob Kinsman	5 May 2023	N/A
Meeting Maisie, Taz finds a would-be kindred spirit as they embark on protecting the local otters. However, as they become friends, Taz finds out that Maisie isn’t who she says she is and with Kyle's help, tries to seek justice. Meanwhile, Bonnie and Sabrina try to find a lost lizard in order to get some extra money. Absent: Josh Sangha as Sid and Zanele Nyoni as Izzy Musonda
196	14	"Karma Drama Queen"	Richard Johnstone	Jeff Povey	12 May 2023	N/A
Discovering how to get good karma, Floss faces the incredibly tall task of making good for all her past mistakes. However, Wes, under the influence of Jay, is getting drawn to payback at Floss for lying. Meanwhile, Sid tries to break the world record for standing still the longest. Absent: Zanele Nyoni as Izzy Musonda
197	15	"Intergalactic"	Stephanie Zari	Jane Wainwright	19 May 2023	N/A
As Jay recovers from a knee injury, he is given a huge opportunity with an internship that forces him to consider his future and life outside his comfort zone. Meanwhile, Wes goes to visit his grandparents and struggles to deal with the truth about his grandma's dementia, whilst Sid tries to find an alien back at the DG. Last Appearance: Cole Wealleans-Watts as Jay Wallis Returned: Ruben Reuter as Finn McLaine Absent: Halle Cassell as Clem Stephens
198	16	"Sister to Sister"	Stephanie Zari	Gemma Mushington	26 May 2023	N/A
When Clem’s sister Nicole turns up where she’d least expect it, they both make discoveries about each other that they would never have imagined leading for disaster to strike when Clem discovers that Nicole has lied to her. Meanwhile, Bonnie's jealousy drives her to use new girl Dita for some pranks on Izzy. First Appearance: Kayleen Ngeuma as Dita Okomo
199	17	"Mother's Day"	Duncan Foster	Matthew Leys	2 June 2023	N/A
The day is finally here for Finn to meet his mum for the first time. However, as his excitement grows, so too do his nerves as he questions why she abandoned him as a baby. Meanwhile, Fraser invents a new sport that gets the other kids playing it while Wes tries to make the perfect vlog for a school assignment.
200	18	"Life Is What You Bake It"	Duncan Foster	Jordan Barrett	9 June 2023	N/A
With a prized scholarship up for grabs, Floss enters a prestigious baking competition. However, as the heat rises in the kitchen, Floss faces a fierce battle for her future as she struggles to win. Meanwhile, Bonnie's discover of a trophy gets all the other DG kids involved in a big water fight. Last Appearance: Sarah Rayson as Floss Guppy Guest Appearances: Jessie Williams as Lily Kettle, Stacy Liu as May-Li Wang, Akuc Bol as Kazima Tako, Nelly Currant as Toni Trent, Gwen Currant as Billie Trent, Connor Lawson as Alex Walker, Leo James as Bird Wallis and Cole Wealleans-Watts as Jay Wallis
201	19	"The Monster Within"	Duncan Foster	Niki Rooney	16 June 2023	N/A
Sabrina’s determined to make the scariest film ever. However, as she gathers a crew, her bad attitude only isolates her further, while Kyle’s past demons come to the surface.
202	20	"Bright Sparks"	Duncan Foster	Keith Brumpton	23 June 2023	N/A
Izzy builds a dream go-kart. However, as scars from her past are unveiled, a race beckons. Meanwhile, Kyle’s offer to help Hugo leads to an explosive outcome that will change the DG forever. Last Appearance: Jasmine Uson as Taz De Souza, Halle Cassell as Clem Stephens, Freddy Smith as Kyle Lawton Hugo Nash as Hugo Little and Ashdene Ridge
