= Swiss Science Center Technorama =

Museum in Winterthur, Switzerland

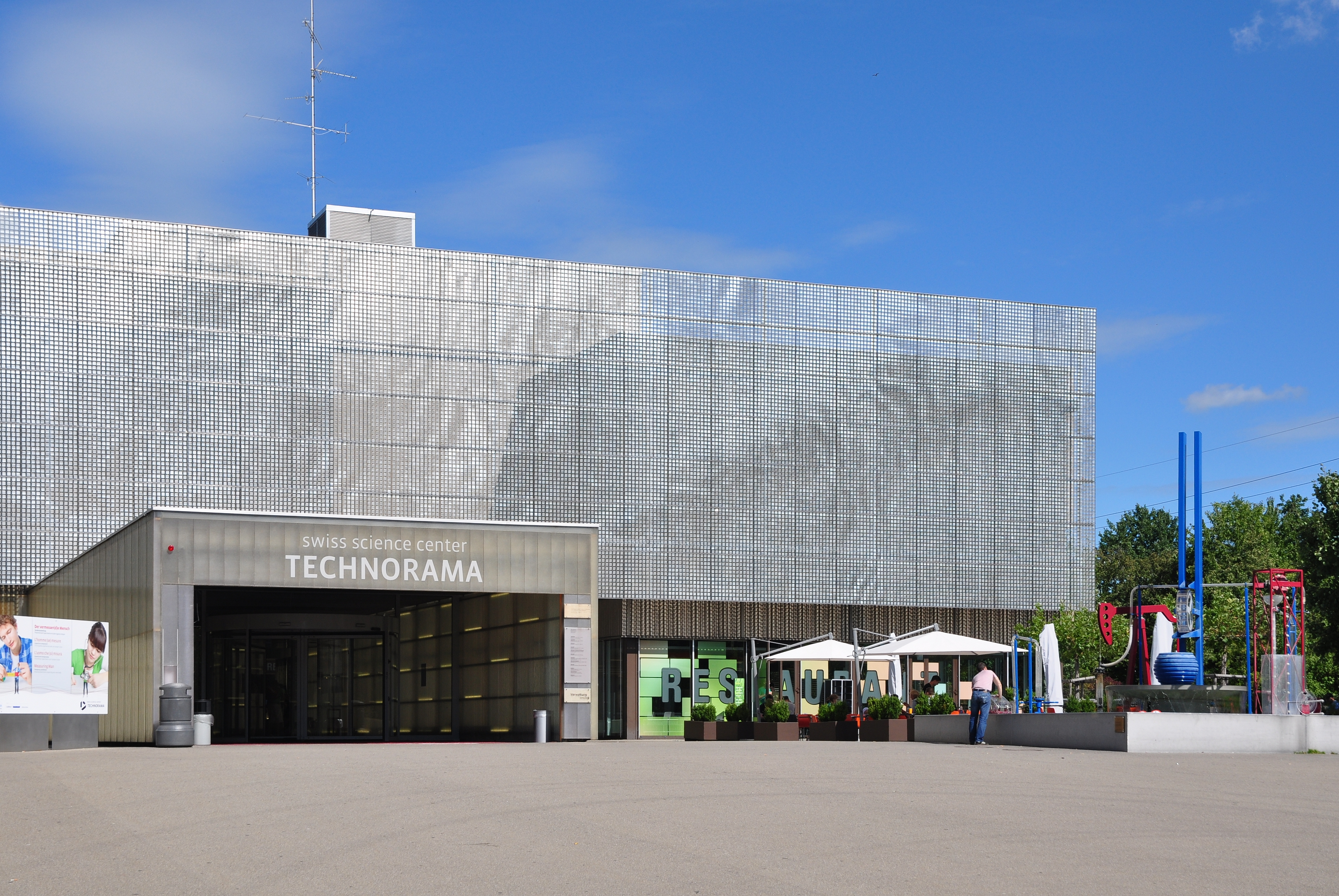
- Established: 1982
- Location: Technoramastrasse 1, 8404 Winterthur
- Coordinates: 47°30′48.16″N 8°45′49.04″E
- Type: Science, art, and human perception
- Visitors: 369'211 (2025)
- Director: Thorsten-D. Künnemann
- Public transit access: S-Bahn Zürich, S12 (ZVV), S29 (ZVV), and Winterthur bus line 5
- Parking: On site
- Website: www.technorama.ch

The Swiss Science Center Technorama (Swiss German native name: Technorama) is a science museum in the city of Winterthur in the canton of Zürich, Switzerland.

== History ==
In 1947, an association for the establishment of a technical museum in Switzerland was launched, and objects were held by the industrial companies of the Winterthur–Zürich–Baden region. On 26 June 1969, a foundation in accordance with Art. 80 ff ZGB was founded under the name Technorama der Schweiz, purposing science and technology for vivid spectacle. In 1982 an exhibition was presented, but in a conservative way being a conventional technology museum, covered by verbal information masses, mainly in the form of an audiovisual superstructure. In June 1990 a new mission statement was adopted, created by the former director Remo Besio. Essentially, it was inspired and designed by the leading science centers of the UK and the US, including the Exploratorium in San Francisco. The theoretical basis were the considerations of Frank Oppenheimer and Richard Gregory, to establish an interactive science museum, as well as publications by Steven Pizzey, and reports and evaluations of the Association of Science and Technology Centers. Finally, both incorporated in the model as well as the principles and suggestions of Hugo Kükelhaus. Until 2000, Technorama was converted from a classical museum into a Science Center, a vivid atmosphere that encourages hands-on experiments. The increase and proportion of adolescents and children of pre-school niveau as visitors, established Technorama as part of the educational system and as additional extracurricular lessons. In 1999 occurred a reorganization of the foundation and a cleanup of its structure, and the revision of the regulations and statutes. In 2012 the museum was remodeled and the laboratory area was expanded.

In 2024, the Swiss Science Center Technorama achieved a new visitor record with 372'932 visitors, Among these visitors, 63,370 were students, with more than 70% coming from Swiss schools.

== Museum ==
Technorama offers an experimental environment for its visitors, irrespective of age and background, to improve knowledge about natural phenomena in a self-directed way. Usually worldwide described as “science centres”, Technorama's program may differ markedly: there are over 500 exhibits respectively "experiment stations" and wide-ranging "laboratory facilities". Technorama claims to be "one of the largest – and on account of its quality and its exemplary informal educational function – most renowned science centres in the world".

Everything in the Technorama facility is based on the way in which science can best be appreciated, taught and learnt, in school or in practice, providing teachers with training in the principles of science education or by enabling schools to use its unique experimental and laboratory resources. Technorama provides a personal contact with natural phenomena, so that the personal experience with science replaces dry fact-learning. The exhibits try to invoke all the senses for learning, as the essential basis for later theoretical treatment. The exhibits allow the visitors to “get in touch with science”.

The museum is open daily from 10am to 5pm. After-hours visits are available by appointment, as well as guided tours for groups. The building houses the museum on about 6,500 square meters, as well as a restaurant and rooms for seminars and events. The staff of the museum consists of approximately 143 employees that share 86.55 full-time jobs. The Swiss Science Centre Technorama is directed by the Technorama Foundation, and sponsored by companies and institutions.

=== Extracurricular learning place ===
Every year, over 64,000 school children in organized groups visit Technorama, making it the most popular out-of-school science learning institution in Switzerland.

Technorama supports teachers in communicating science and participates in national initiatives to improve science education, focusing on primary schools to inspire young children with scientific and technical ideas. In 2023, Technorama hosted 17 in-service training courses with a total of 262 teachers, and 457 teachers attended introductory events.

== Exhibitions ==
=== Permanent exhibitions ===
A large portion of the exhibition space is dedicated to permanent exhibitions. They feature over 500 permanently installed interactive stations, organized into various subject areas:

- Mechanicum (mechanics)
- Current and Magnets (electromagnetism)
- Dying and Living (biology)
- Mathemagic (mathematics)
- Mindscapes (perception)
- Water, Nature, Chaos (physics)
- Light and Sight (optics)
- Et Cetera (various)
- The Sound of Wood (wooden machines)

=== Spielzeugeisenbahn-Sammlung Bommer ===
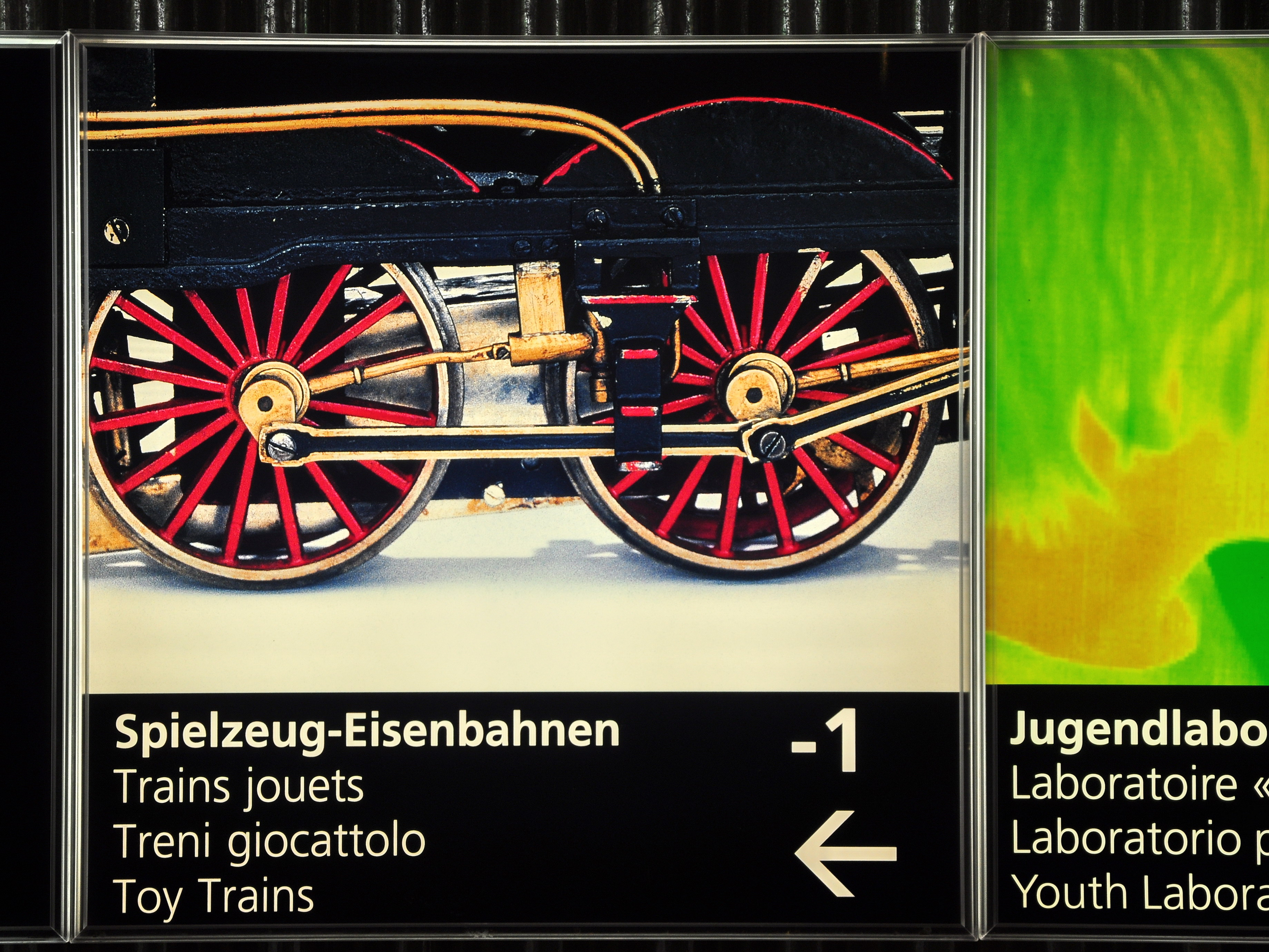
Spielzeugeisenbahn-Sammlung Bommer

That section houses the model train collection Spielzeugeisenbahn-Sammlung Bommer of miniature rarities, that was established in February 2004. The exhibition offers an extended exploration of tinplate toy nostalgia and its curiosities, many of them dating from the period around 1900 AD. Technorama claims to be the home to the world's greatest toy train collection, the Dr. Bommer Toy Train Foundation, that provides a technically and historically important view of the development of rail transportation in Switzerland. In the Swiss inventory of cultural property of national and regional significance the museum respectively the Spielzeugeisenbahn-Sammlung Bommer is listed as a Class A object of national importance.

=== AdventureRooms (permanently closed) ===
In 2017, Technorama opened an escape room in collaboration with AdventureRooms, called AdventureRooms Technorama. The two games, Spectrum and Continuum, featured puzzles based on scientific and technological phenomena. Although AdventureRooms Technorama was located in the same building as the Swiss Science Center Technorama and could be visited separately, it was permanently closed in 2023.

=== Special exhibitions ===
==== Test exhibition You Decide ====
The test exhibition about decision making was openend in spring of 2025. The exhibition explores phenomena of psychology and decision theory. The exhibitions was opened and made public as work in progress. It is contiously being developed while including visitor feedback. Finalised exhibits' assembly instructions are published as Open Source online.

==== Temporary exhibition Sound Worlds ====
One area of the Technorama is dedicated to temporary exhibitions that change every two to four years. The current exhibition Sound Worlds was opened in March 2025 following the Mirror Worlds exhibition. The exhibition shows acoustic phenomena.

=== Technorama Outdoors ===
Technorama Outdoors, part of the Swiss Science Center Technorama, offers an immersive scientific experience in a natural setting. Opened in 2020, it features interactive exhibits like the large bridge, water installations demonstrating hydrodynamic principles, and wind exhibits exploring aerodynamic effects. This expansive area encourages hands-on exploration and learning through engaging with natural elements and scientific phenomena, enhancing the educational experience found within Technorama's indoor exhibits.

=== Laboratories ===
The seven laboratories of Technorama are specialized for either workshops in physics, chemistry or biology. Various different workshops and OpenLab sessions are offered every day.

== Location and traffic connections ==
Public transportation is provided by the S-Bahn Zürich line S12 (ZVV) or S29 (ZVV) to Oberwinterthur, or by Winterthur local bus line 5 to the stop Technorama. The Oberwinterthur exit on the A1 motorway is approximately 1.5 km away.

== Literature ==
- Hans-Erhard Lessing: Naturschön - Phänomene im Technorama. Verlag Huber, Frauenfeld 2006, ISBN 978-3-7193-1388-3.

== See also ==
- List of museums in Switzerland
