= Technorama =

Technorama may refer to:

- Technorama, Swiss technical museum and science center
- line of panoramic photography cameras from Linhof
