= Freeing HK =

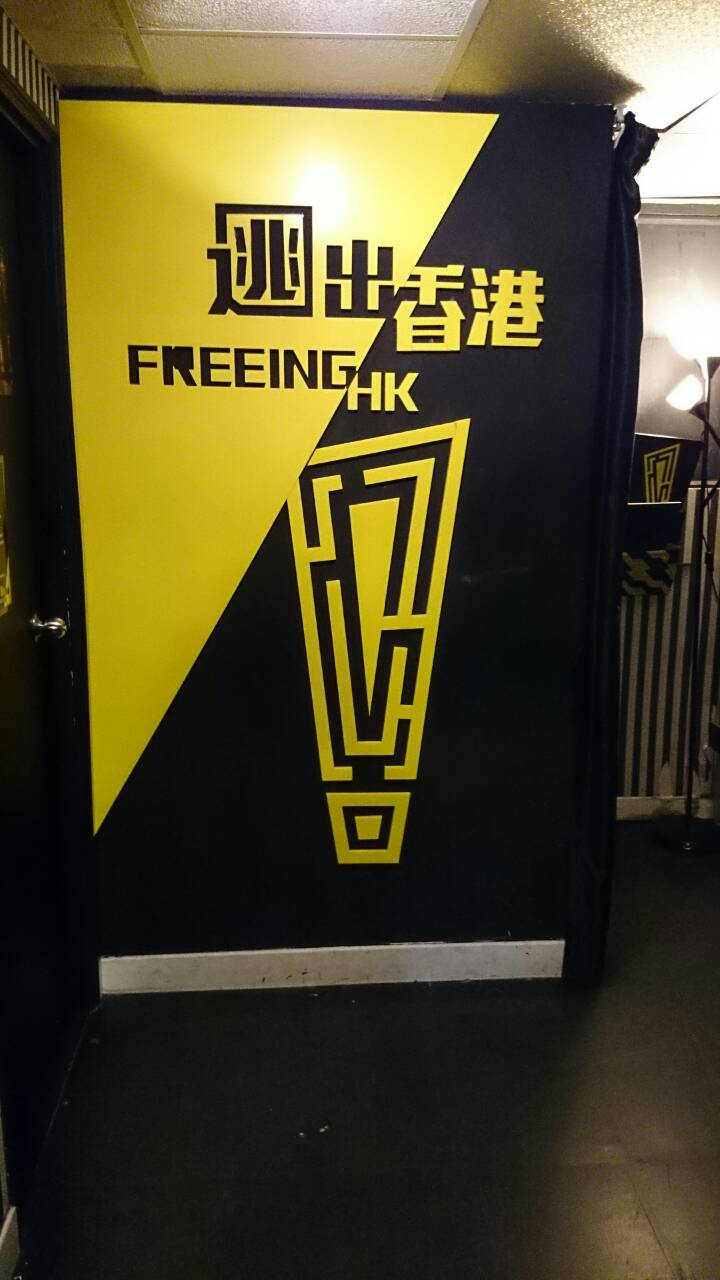
Freeing HK

Freeing HK (Chinese: 逃出香港) is the first room escape based game company in Hong Kong which was founded by four Post 80s and 90s in 2012. Players are given a scenario and have to break out of a locked room within 45 minutes, and each player can only enter each themed room once.

== History ==
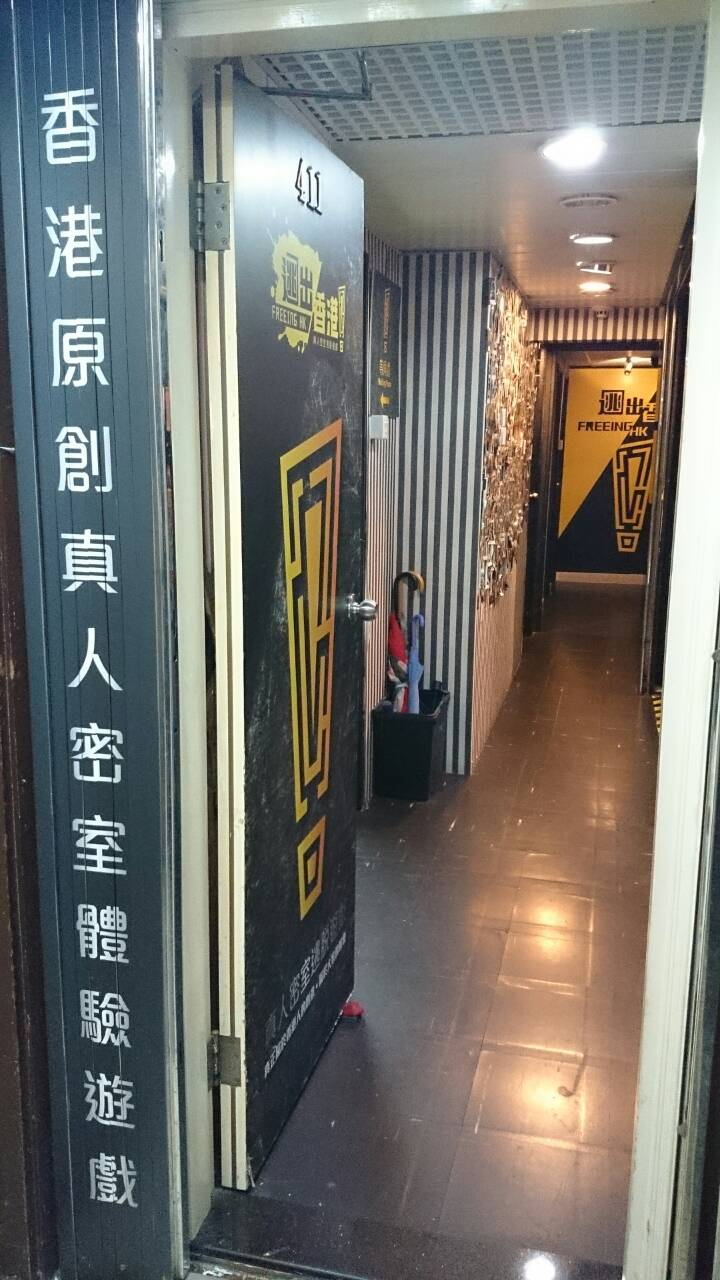
Front door of Mong Kok branch

Founded in 2012, Freeing HK is the city's first room escape game. It was set up by a group of four friends, including a business student from HKUST called Raymond Sze Wai-hang and a business man called Instant Wan Sze-tang. Freeing HK aims at providing "an alternative to the usual entertainments such as shopping, karaoke or watching movies, which Hong Kong people are so tired of". It also symbolizes escaping from boring Hong Kong.

== Significance ==
In these years, the phenomenon "Hong Kong Kid" frequently hits the headlines stating that Hong Kong youngsters have low emotional intelligence and are vulnerable to adversity. "The game can help participants enhance their problem-solving skills and learn to stand still when facing challenges", said one of the founders, Raymond Sze Wai-hang. Amid the game, participants are locked up in a room and there is only one way to escape which is to figure out the correlation between clues and solve all the questions by themselves. Skills like the way to fire up imagination, solve problems and communicate with teammates thus can be learnt throughout the activity.

Freeing HK is a local real-life game established by four young people. By the time they wanted to actualize their ideas, negative opinions and discouragement were from all around. Spending a half year on marketing, they finally started the business and had over 80,000 customers within a year. This case has aroused the public attention and has emboldened youngsters to be brave to set up a business. Recently, the team has adopted the new technology introduced by ALiVE, a laboratory of School of Creative Media of City University of Hong Kong. For a long time, Hong Kong has been criticized for overlooking the importance of creativity. Regarding this, Freeing HK is considered as an encouragement to the public in achieving their dreams.

== Public Response ==
Freeing HK has received a wide coverage from mass media since it has launched in 2012. They have been invited by national and international media for Interviews and news reports. National media included BBC News (UK), TVB (Hong Kong), Now TV (Hong Kong) and Dragon TV (Shanghai) while International media included AFP (France), CBC (Canada) and CNN (US).

Over 100,000 people have experienced this real-life escape game so far. 80 percent of the customers aged from 15 to 25. Freeing HK was at first targeting mainly youngsters in Hong Kong. Gaining popularity among Hong Kong society, there is a growing trend in customers from office workers as well.

Beside typical walk-ins, collaboration with other companies and corporate training are within Freeing HK's services. It has so far organized corporate team building events for a wide range of companies, such as P&G and Cathay Pacific, with debriefing sections provided as well. Meanwhile, Freeing HK have also involved in several charity events with local organizations, such as Evangelical Lutheran Church Social Service (Hong Kong) and Orbis. Freeing HK also has frequent commercial collaboration with other companies, such as LG and Acuvue.

== Development ==
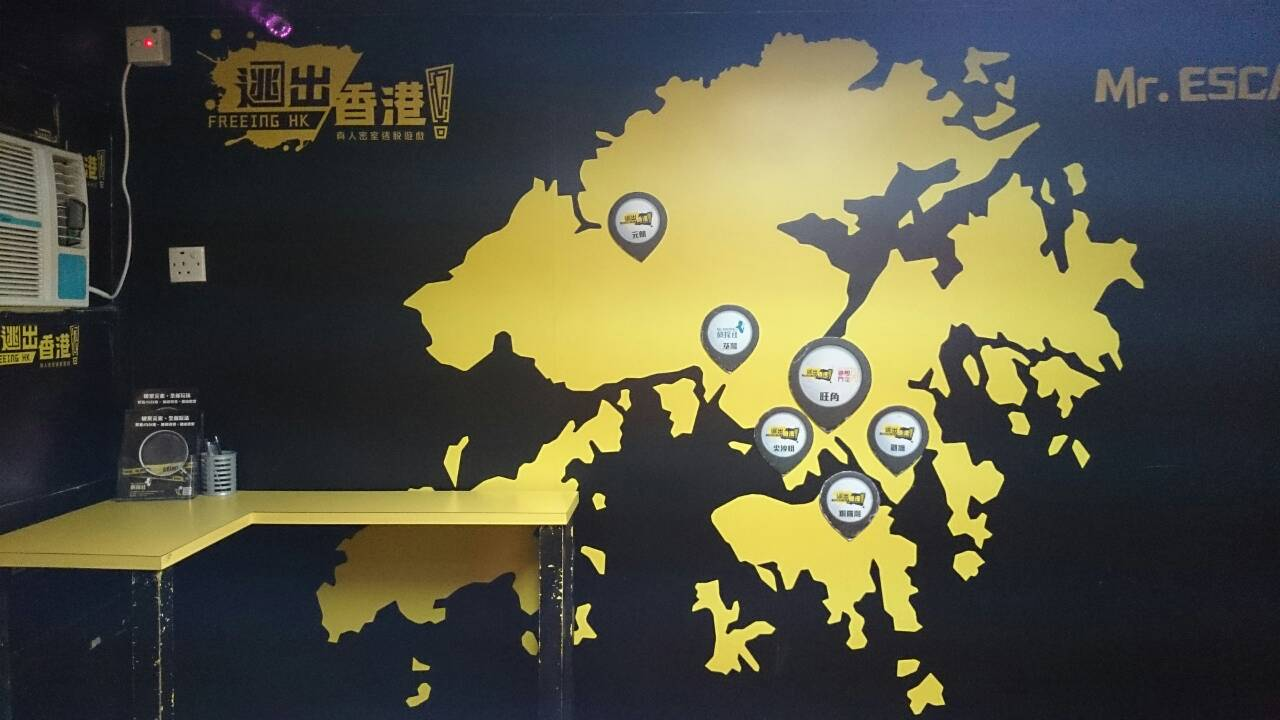
A display board showing the locations of branches

The game had had 5,000 people visiting in the first three months after it launched. Initially, Freeing HK had only one outlet located in Sai Yeung Choi Street South, Mong Kok. In 2013, outlets in Causeway Bay and Tsim Sha Tsui were opened respectively in April and May. In September 2013, the 4th outlet was based in Kwun Tong, which is the first outlet that adopts 3-D technology. Later, the Yuen Long and Tsuen Wan outlets and the first overseas outlets in Macau were launched. Freeing HK is now planning to extend their business to Guangzhou.

In 2013, HK escape, another real-life room escape in Hong Kong was accused by Freeing HK of infringement of copyrights. Freeing HK demanded compensation and immediate injunction to stop HK escape's business.

In 2013, the Freeing SG was set up in Singapore, being the largest "Freeing" flagship globally.

== Characteristics ==
Freeing HK has 7 branches, 6 of them located in Hong Kong and 1 in Macau. All branches have different themes including adventure, technology, Hong Kong style, fantasy, riddle, dream and Macau style. These themed rooms are located in Causeway Bay, Kwun Tong, Mong Kok, Tsim Sha Tsui, Tsuen Wan, Yuen Long and Macau respectively.

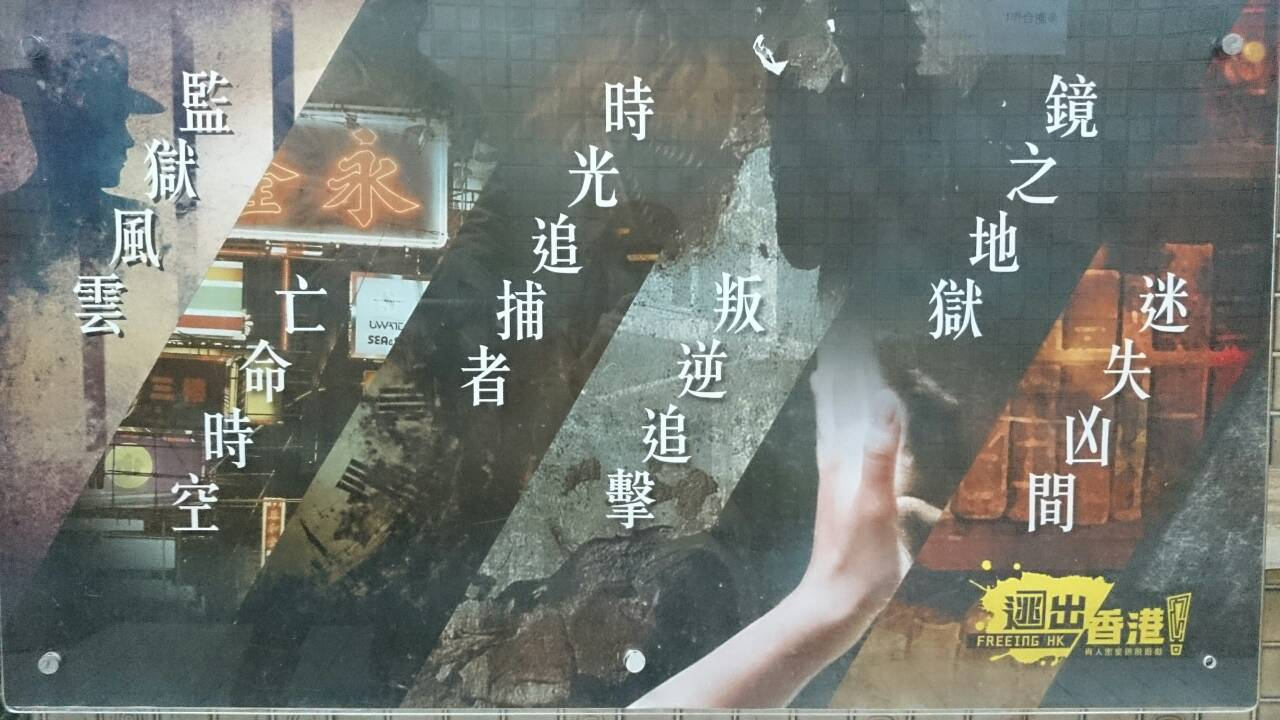
Different themes offered by Mong Kok branch

In order to make the game as a tailor-made experience for Hongkongers, riddles are based on knowledge of Hong Kong or stories, movies and places that local people are familiar with. The outlet in Mong Kok themed Hong Kong were built based on Hong Kong featured stories, sites, tools such as traditional toys and other collective memories in the city. For example, one of the themed rooms is called Stalker's Treachery, and players have to escape by crawling along the tunnel, like most local Gangster wars do.

Technologies such as 3-D animation, laser, projection and interactive inductor are employed to enhance the sense of reality and create tense atmosphere. Besides, Role-playing game (RPG) elements are added into the game. For example, in Kwun Tong branch which uses technology as the theme, players have to use laser to "kill" the monster; while in another themed room, 3 actors who dress like magicians will guide the players through the adventure. Freeing HK makes the real life room escape game into a 21st-century adventure.

== See also ==
- Escape room
