= Schitt's Creek season 6 =

2020 season of Schitt's Creek

Schitt's Creek
- Season 6
- Promotional poster
- Starring: Eugene Levy; Catherine O'Hara; Dan Levy; Annie Murphy; Jennifer Robertson; Emily Hampshire; Chris Elliott; Sarah Levy; Noah Reid
- No. of episodes: 15

Release
- Original network: CBC Television
- Original release: January 7 – April 7, 2020

The sixth and final season of Schitt's Creek, a Canadian television sitcom created by Dan Levy and father Eugene Levy premiered on January 7, 2020, and concluded on April 7, 2020, on CBC Television, and was followed by a one-hour behind-the-scenes retrospective documentary titled Best Wishes, Warmest Regards: A Schitt's Creek Farewell. The season aired 14 episodes and saw the final appearances of the Rose Family, consisting of characters Johnny Rose, Moira Rose, David Rose, and Alexis Rose.

Dan Levy initially envisioned the series ending with season five, but agreed to a sixth season after receiving a two-year renewal following the show's fourth season.

== Cast and characters ==
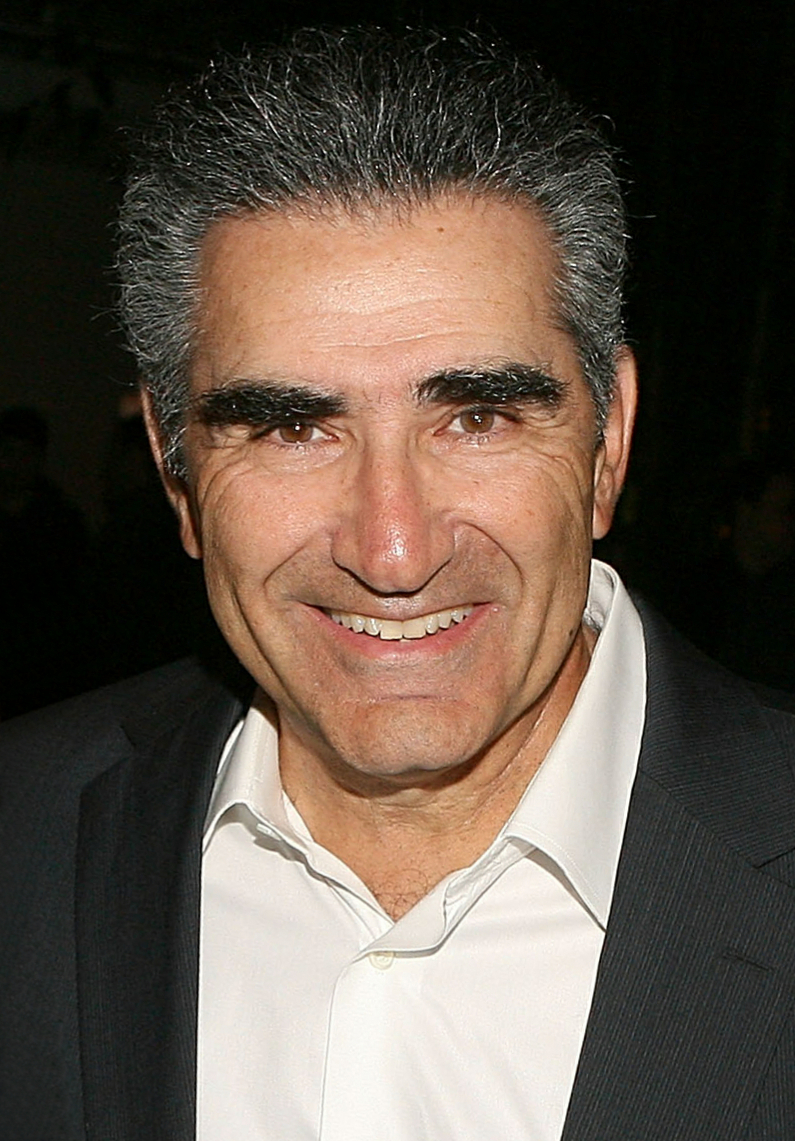
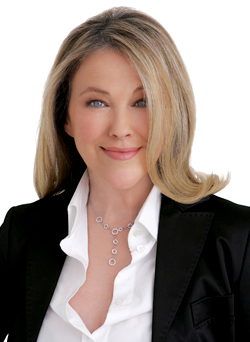
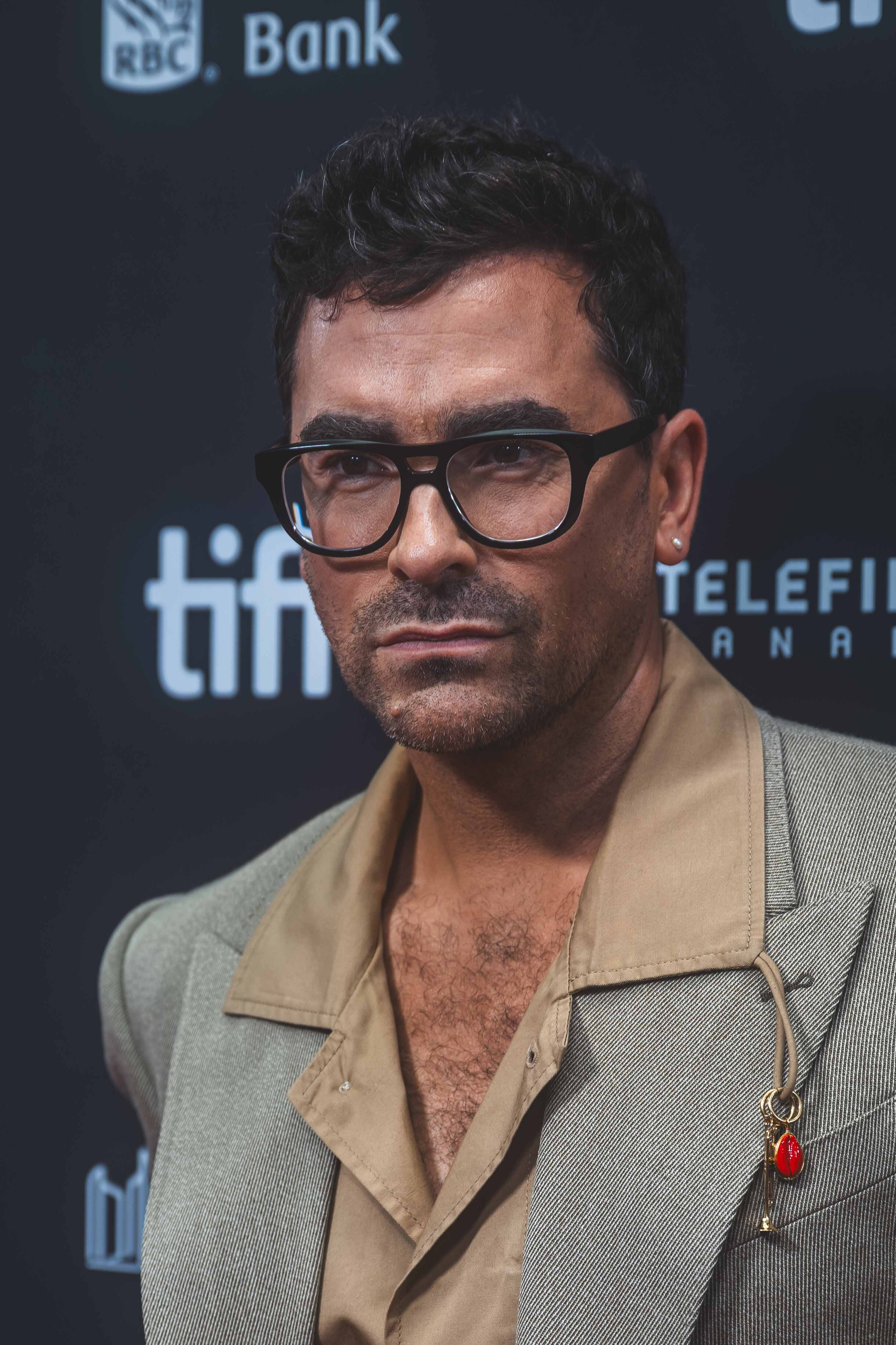
Eugene Levy (Johnny Rose), Catherine O'Hara (Moira Rose), and Dan Levy (David Rose)
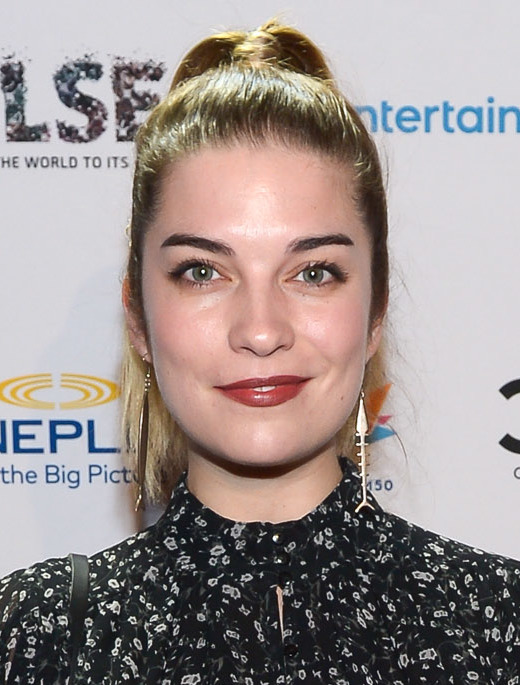
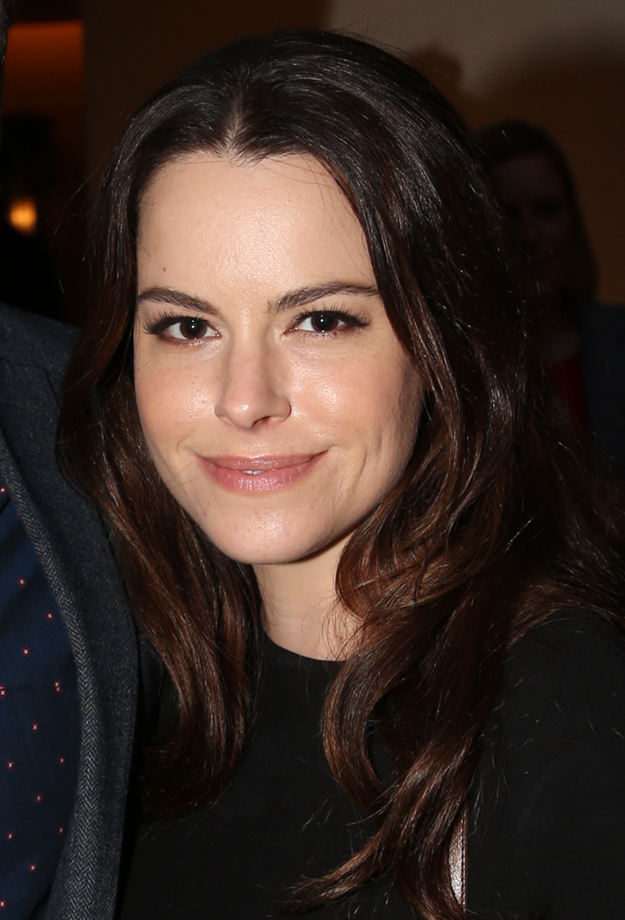
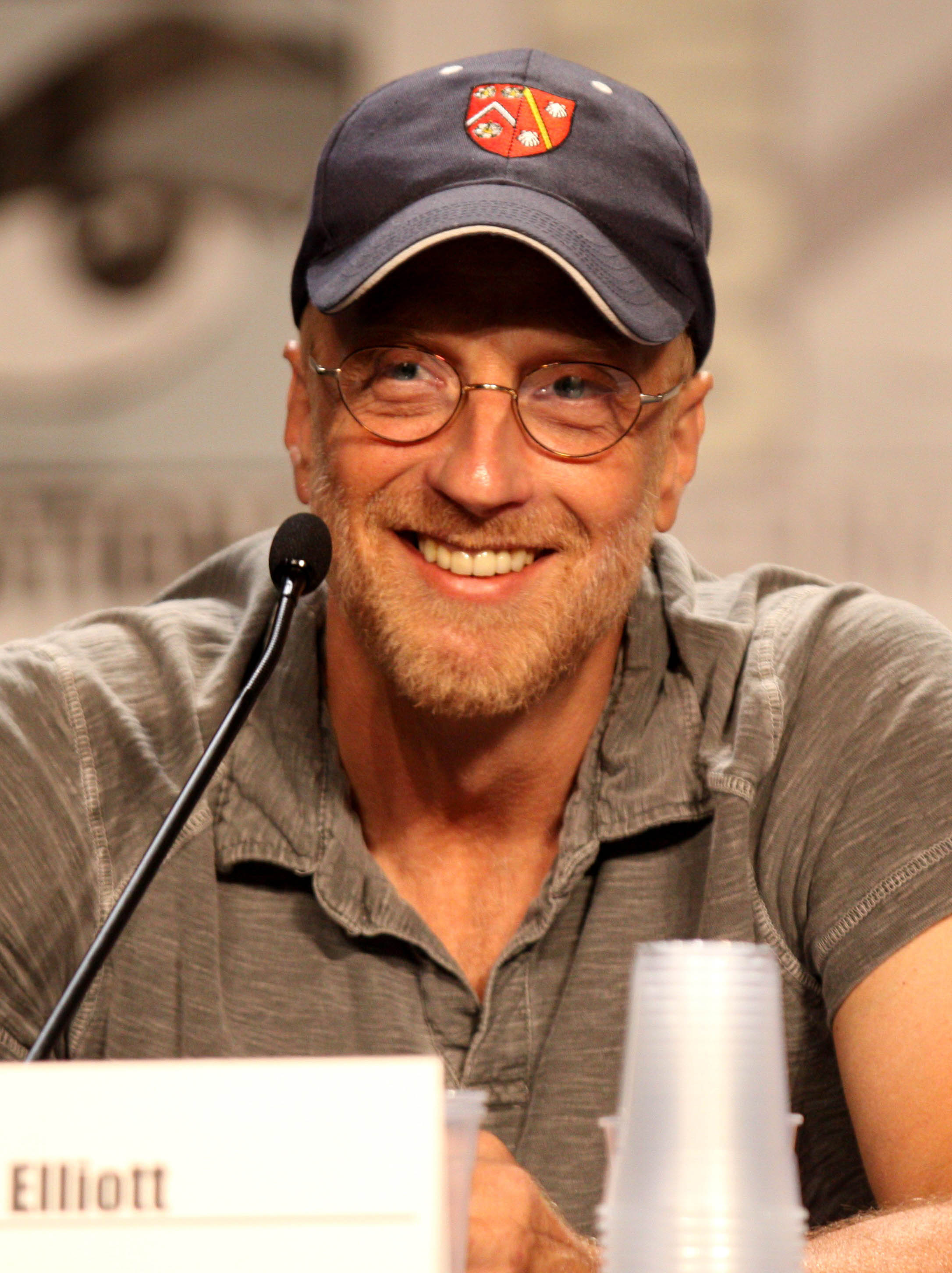
Annie Murphy (Alexis Rose), Emily Hampshire (Stevie Budd), and Chris Elliott (Roland Schitt)

=== Main ===
- Eugene Levy as Johnny Rose
- Catherine O'Hara as Moira Rose
- Dan Levy as David Rose
- Annie Murphy as Alexis Rose
- Jennifer Robertson as Jocelyn Schitt
- Emily Hampshire as Stevie Budd
- Sarah Levy as Twyla Sands
- Noah Reid as Patrick Brewer
- Chris Elliott as Roland Schitt

=== Starring ===
- Dustin Milligan as Ted Mullens
- John Hemphill as Bob Currie
- Karen Robinson as Ronnie Lee

=== Recurring ===
- Rizwan Manji as Ray Butani
- Marilyn Bellfontaine as Gwen Currie
- Steve Lund as Jake

=== Guest ===
- Richard Waugh as Herb Ertlinger
- Elizabeth McEachern as Robin
- Victor Garber as Clifton Sparks
- Saul Rubinek as Tippy Bernstein
- Henry Czerny as Artie
- Kim Roberts as Marnie
- Deborah Tennant as Marcy Brewer
- Ted Whittall as Clint Brewer

== Episodes ==
No. overall	No. in season	Title	Directed by	Written by	Original release date	Prod. code	Canadian viewers (millions)
67	1	"Smoke Signals"	Daniel Levy	Daniel Levy	January 7, 2020	262452-67	N/A
Roland accidentally toasts something that cannot be toasted and floods the motel with smoke, smoke that enters Moira's room where she is trapped in her closet. Roland helps her escape and saves her wigs from the smoke. Alexis is leaving in a few hours to meet up with Ted, or so she thinks, but has transposed the day and month on her airline reservation, resulting in her reservation not being for another month. Meanwhile, David and Patrick find the perfect wedding venue, and learn that Sundays are heavily discounted, making it affordable, and the venue has had a cancellation for an upcoming Sunday. They then learn that the adjacent pig farm butchers pigs with a great deal of noise and smell on Sundays (the reason for the discount) and realize they must keep looking for a suitable venue.
68	2	"The Incident"	Jordan Canning	Daniel Levy	January 14, 2020	262452-68	N/A
Moira has taken over the Instagram feed of the streaming service that is releasing her Crows movie for a day. David's excitement over the wedding plans causes him to wet the bed and he is profoundly humiliated. As Moira and Patrick discuss the bed-wetting incident with sweet and loving understanding, Moira has left a livestream going on her phone, allowing thousands of followers of the Instagram account to hear the conversation.
69	3	"The Job Interview"	Andrew Cividino	Michael Short	January 21, 2020	262452-69	N/A
Stevie and David attend a class/interview to be flight attendants. David is eliminated quickly, and Stevie receives a job offer. Johnny's loan application to purchase a second motel is rejected, as he cannot use the Rosebud as collateral, since only Stevie is listed as the owner. Roland and Jocelyn take out a second mortgage and purchase the second motel, making Johnny, reluctantly, full business partners with them. Alexis has a romantic video conference date with Ted, which Twyla helped set up.
70	4	"Maid of Honour"	Andrew Cividino	Kurt Smeaton	January 28, 2020	262452-70	N/A
Alexis attempts to convince Stevie to give up her maid of honour role, while David and Patrick try on wedding clothes. Moira shares the newly released Crows movie trailer with the Jazzagals. Johnny and Roland find a suspicious bag of money at the new motel.
71	5	"The Premiere"	Andrew Cividino	David West Read	February 4, 2020	262452-71	N/A
Alexis plans a local premiere for the Crows movie and Moira makes a big splash on the red carpet, while David tends to Patrick after his wisdom teeth removal. Stevie asks to be a partner again in the motel business, to Johnny's relief, as he was feeling overwhelmed without her (and Roland tends to be worse than no help at all).
72	6	"The Wingman"	Donna Croce	David West Read	February 11, 2020	262452-72	N/A
A video of the red carpet bird attack fiasco went viral, causing Alexis and Moira to claim that it was a promotional stunt. Johnny, Roland, and Ronnie take Bob out to a bar to help him begin dating. David and Patrick order a coffee table, which is delivered by Jake, David and Stevie's ex-lover. Jake invites David and Patrick over to his house; they are nervous that he wants a threesome but are surprised when Stevie is already there. Alexis and Ted are having trouble communicating while Ted is in the Galápagos, and Ted tells Alexis that she should pursue her career instead of coming to be with him.
73	7	"Moira Rosé"	Jordan Canning	David West Read	February 18, 2020	262452-73	N/A
A local vineyard wants to introduce a wine called Moira Rosé. Moira and David taste samples to pick one and find them all repulsive, but get extremely drunk anyway. Alexis takes some of the ladies to an exercise class for a new client, that turns out to be a cult. At Roland's urging, Johnny has "the talk" with Patrick, which Patrick leads, to Johnny's relief.
74	8	"The Presidential Suite"	Andrew Cividino	David West Read	February 25, 2020	262452-74	N/A
Johnny and Moira compete with Roland and Jocelyn for a night in the presidential suite in the new motel. Ted makes a surprise visit and brings the news that he got offered a permanent job in the Galapagos Islands, leaving him and Alexis with the extremely difficult decision on how to handle the situation: seeing no other solution, they profess once again their love for one another and painfully agree to mutually break up so they can both pursue their dream jobs. David convinces Patrick to get a spray tan for their pre-wedding photos but he turns out orange.
75	9	"Rebound"	Jordan Canning	Michael Short	March 3, 2020	262452-75	N/A
A heartbroken Alexis rebounds by dating an older man (Henry Czerny), to Johnny's dismay but he convinces the man to break up with Alexis. Moira insults the town in an interview with People magazine, so she tries to make amends by making a video advertising the town as a vacation spot, but that is fairly lukewarm too. Jocelyn starts working at Rose Apothecary and to David's surprise is extremely good at making sales, but she declines to work there permanently.
76	10	"Sunrise, Sunset"	Jordan Canning	Kurt Smeaton & Winter Tekenos-Levy	March 10, 2020	262452-76	N/A
The producer of Moira's former soap, Sunrise Bay, proposes a prime-time reboot. Alexis binge-watches the soap and researches its internal politics and ends up giving Moira sound advice. Victor Garber guest stars as the soap's scheming star and Saul Rubinek appears as its producer. Meanwhile, Johnny, Stevie and Roland run into an issue with the new motel that has them rethinking their investment.
77	11	"The Bachelor Party"	Andrew Cividino	David West Read	March 17, 2020	262452-77	N/A
Stevie's planned bachelor party has a part for both David and Patrick: somewhat elegant cocktails for the former and an escape room in Elmdale for the latter. Alexis escorts Moira to her new job as a spokesperson for Larry Air, and both Alexis and Moira doubt their choices. The escape room is Galapagos-themed, much to the delight of Alexis who is missing Ted. During the escape room, Johnny reveals to his family that there is a possible investor for the Rosebud motel chains which would mean a lot of money for the family, but his phone is outside of the escape room. Alexis surprises everyone when she solves the final clue singlehandedly and the family wins the escape room and on Johnny's phone the investor leaves a voicemail asking for a meeting. Alexis contemplates leaving Schitt's Creek to grow her business.
78	12	"The Pitch"	Andrew Cividino	Daniel Levy	March 24, 2020	262452-78	N/A
Johnny, Stevie, and Roland head to New York for their pitch meeting, and the family anxiously awaits their return. When they arrive they learn that Johnny's former assistant, who is their investor, is unable to make the meeting. Meanwhile, in Schitt's Creek, Moira starts packing to leave and Alexis starts looking for New York apartment rentals, which is a little premature because the meeting does not go smoothly at all as technology fails and Roland knocks over some water. David tells Patrick of the family's plan to move to New York and Patrick is not excited about the idea. Johnny, Stevie and Roland bring their presentation around despite their shaky start, but Roland overhears the investors making fun of Johnny and tells them off. The firm decides not to invest in Johnny's idea but a few of the people in the boardroom are planning to defect and start their own firm and want to back the Rosebud motel.
79	13	"Start Spreading the News"	Jordan Canning	Daniel Levy	March 31, 2020	262452-79	N/A
Jocelyn gives Moira the news that Sunrise Bay is greenlit for a reboot, seemingly without her. Stevie lets it slip to David that Patrick has been looking for a house for the two of them. Twyla reveals that, just after the Roses arrived, she won 46 million dollars in the lottery and works in the cafe just for fun. Sunrise Bay unexpectedly gives in to Moira's insane demands and she is set to be on the show again. Moira attends her last practice with the Jazzagals and even Ronnie cries. Twyla buys the café with her lottery money because it makes her smile and gives a large check to Alexis who declines to take it. Stevie and David have a heart-to-heart at the would-be-house of David and Patrick. David reveals that he is staying in Schitt’s Creek while Johnny and Moira head to California and Alexis heads to New York alone.
80	14	"Happy Ending"	Andrew Cividino & Daniel Levy	Daniel Levy	April 7, 2020	262452-80	1.221
On the day of his wedding, David finds out that his special day has been interrupted by a rainstorm. After getting a massage (which inadvertently ended with him receiving a "happy ending"), David is informed that the wedding will now be held at the town hall. When the original officiant cancels, David's mother Moira fills in. In the town hall, David and Patrick are married. The next day, Johnny and Moira depart from Schitt's Creek en route to California.

=== Special (2020) ===
No.	Title	Directed by	Written by	Original release date
81	"Best Wishes, Warmest Regards: A Schitt's Creek Farewell"	Amy Segal	Amy Segal	April 7, 2020
A retrospective behind-the-scenes documentary about the making of the series.

== Reception and release ==
=== Awards and nominations ===
The show received 15 Emmy nominations for its sixth and final season, setting a record for most Emmy nominations for a comedy series's final season. For its portrayal of LGBTQ+ people, the series received three nominations for a GLAAD Media Award for Outstanding Comedy Series, winning twice.

A brief list of awards Schitt's Creek received and/or were nominated for
Year	Award	Category	Nominee	Result	Ref
2021	ACTRA Award in Toronto	Members' Choice Series Ensemble	Schitt's Creek	Won	
2021	American Cinema Editors (ACE) Eddie Awards	Best Edited Comedy Series for Commercial Television	Trevor Ambrose (for "Happy Ending")	Won	
2021	Australian Academy of Cinema Television Arts (AACTA) International Awards	Best Comedy Series	Schitt's Creek	Won	
2021	Australian Academy of Cinema Television Arts (AACTA) International Awards	Best Actor in a Series	Daniel Levy	Nominated	
2021	Australian Academy of Cinema Television Arts (AACTA) International Awards	Best Actress in a Series	Catherine O'Hara	Nominated	

=== Release ===
The first five seasons of the series maintained staggered premieres, with new episodes debuting in Canada before being broadcast in the United States. This changed for this season, with new episodes being broadcast simultaneously in Canada and the United States. The series finale aired on April 7, 2020, at 8:00 pm ET; it was followed by a one-hour behind-the-scenes retrospective documentary titled Best Wishes, Warmest Regards: A Schitt's Creek Farewell. In the United States, the series finale was Schitt's Creek's highest-rated episode ever and simulcast on Logo TV and Comedy Central, which had recently become sibling networks to Pop TV through the ViacomCBS merger.

=== Critical response ===
On Rotten Tomatoes, the final season has an approval rating of 100% based on 43 reviews with an average rating of 9/10. The website's critics' consensus reads: "Witty, warm, and with just the right blend of wisdom and wisecracks, Schitt's Creek's final season is the perfect farewell to the Roses and the town that changed their lives." On Metacritic, the final season has a score of 95 out of 100, based on 4 critics, indicating "universal acclaim". Bridget Read of Vogue wrote that while the series "started off with typical fish out of water scenarios," it has "fully come into its own, with a whole cast of Twin Peaks-meets-Christopher-Guest-universe characters that are as equally endearing".
