= Négone =

Spanish proprietary augmented reality role playing experience

Coordinates: 40.45374°N 3.69415°W

Négone was a Spanish proprietary augmented reality role playing experience played at a facility in Madrid.

== Description ==
In a physical indoor space, an adventure was played out in themed rooms and scenes. The player went through the scenes, interacting with the environment to accomplish the goals of the game. This the player accomplished through physical tasks and by solving puzzles, earning points towards the success of the mission. Time for tasks was limited.

Before entering the game, each player was given a small wristband computer which allowed them to interact with the environment. It also allowed the system to gather information about user actions using RFID and infrared technologies.

Users could continue the game on the internet at home.

== History ==
Négone was created by the Spanish company DifferendGames, S.A., founded in 2002. The first incarnation, “La Maquina” (The Machine), opened in July 2003 at a Shopping Mall on the south of Madrid. A second version opened in downtown Madrid in October 2005, near the Santiago Bernabéu Stadium. This version was entitled La "Fuga" (The Escape), and replicated a futuristic 31st century prison named Mazzinia.

In 2008, the company was working to integrate the first interactive comic book.

Although there were plans to expand Négone to the United States, by mid-2009 Négone had closed.

== See also ==
- Escape room
