= The Dumping Ground series 11 =

The Dumping Ground
- Series 11
- Starring: Andrea Hall; William Wyn Davies; Lara Mehmet; Massimo Cull; Florrie May Wilkinson; Owen Phillips; Zanele Nyoni; Kayleen Ngeuma; Blake Robinson; Michael Carpenter; Raniah Morton; Moses Amedzro; Rochelle Goldie; Robyn Elwell; Charlie Geany
- No. of episodes: 10

Release
- Original network: CBeebies
- Original release: 26 January – 22 March 2024

Series chronology
- ← Previous; Series 10

The eleventh series of the British children's television series The Dumping Ground (revamp CBeebies version) was broadcast from 26 January 2024 to 22 March 2024 on CBeebies. The series followed the lives of the children living in the fictional children's care home of Porter's Lodge, nicknamed by them "The Dumping Ground".

== Cast ==
=== Main ===
- Andrea Hall as Doreen Adebayo
- William Wyn Davies as Ben
- Lara Mehmet as Bonnie Vasiliou
- Massimo Cull as Fraser Vasiliou
- Florrie May Wilkinson as Sabrina Moxley (until episode 10)
- Owen Phillips as Wes Oldfield
- Zanele Nyoni as Izzy Musonda
- Mimi Robertson as Maisie Martin (from episode 1)
- Kayleen Ngeuma as Dita Okomo
- Blake Robinson as Frankie
- Michael Carpenter as Oscar
- Raniah Morton as Shanice
- Moses Amedzro as Jimi
- Rochelle Goldie as Georgia
- Robyn Elwell as Erin
- Emme Patrick as Chelsey
- Charlie Geany as Brodie (from episode 4)

=== Guest ===
- Tracy Collier as Dainty Detective
- Jordan Louis as James
- Ruben Reuter as Finn McLaine
- Pablo Raybould as Ernie the Cleaner

== Episodes ==
No. overall	No. in series	Title	Directed by	Written by	Original release date	UK viewers (millions)
203	1	"Welcome Home"	Daymon Britton	Paul Rose	26 January 2024	N/A
204	2	"I Can Explain"	Lee Skelly	Rob Evans	2 February 2024	N/A
205	3	"Imagine"	Lee Skelly	Jane Wainwright	9 February 2024	N/A
206	4	"Seeing Red"	Lee Skelly	Rob Evans	16 February 2024	N/A
207	5	"Likes"	Lee Skelly	Omar Khan	23 February 2024	N/A
208	6	"Mum's the Word"	Daymon Britton	Jordan Barrett	1 March 2024	N/A
209	7	"Coming Clean"	Daymon Britton	Ciaran Cruickshank	8 March 2024	N/A
210	8	"Big Little Fibs"	Daymon Britton	Tony Cooke	15 March 2024	N/A
211	9	"Fly Away Home"	Duncan Foster	Martin Jameson & Ali Taylor	22 March 2024	N/A
212	10	"Bring the House Down"	Duncan Foster	Ali Taylor	22 March 2024	N/A
