= Claustrophobia (escape room) =

Claustrophobia is a Russian escape room franchise. 142 quests (escape rooms in Russia) have opened under this brand in Russia, Belarus, Ukraine, Andorra, Estonia, and Germany. 120 more quests are under development in Great Britain, Spain, Azerbaijan, and Switzerland. Claustrophobia was included in the “Best in the City” list by Afisha in 2014, and was nominated for RBK Prize 2014 in the “Startup of the Year” category.

== Description ==
A team of 2 to 4 players are locked in a room for 60 minutes. They have to escape the room by solving thematic puzzles. If the players fail to escape within 60 minutes then the doors will still open but the players will not win. The first quests under Claustrophobia's brand, Soviet Apartment and Psychiatric Hospital, appeared in Moscow in December 2013.

Claustrophobia presented a new format – Performance – in September 2014. This is a mix of a game and an interactive performance with real actors, where players become main characters and manage the plot development. In contrast to classic escape rooms, this format focuses on adrenaline and emotions rather than on solving various logical puzzles.

Claustrophobia also has escape rooms designed for children and Arcade, an amusement park with action minigames inspired by classic arcade machines.

== Franchising ==
Claustrophobia's first franchising agreements started in December 2013. The first franchised quests, The Sing-Sing Escape and Australia Motel, opened in Moscow in March 2014. The first quests in St. Petersburg started operating in May, and an office in Nizhny Novgorod followed up in June.

== Quests ==
Country	City	Quest
Andorra	Andorra	An Avalanche of Oblivion
		Cinema despair
Estonia	Tallinn	Gravity
		Baker street, 221 B
		The stormy ocean
Germany	Berlin	Vault 13
		Museum of contemporary art
		Pirate's Hut
