= ClueQuest =

UK escape room company

clueQuest
- Type: Private
- Industry: Escape rooms
- Founded: June 2013
- Founders: Gabor Papp; Peter Papp; Gergely Papp; Zoltan Papp
- Headquarters: London, England, United Kingdom
- Key people: Gabor Papp (CEO)
- Products: Escape room experiences
- Owner: Papp family
- Website: cluequest.co.uk

clueQuest is an escape room company based in the Kings Cross area of London, United Kingdom. According to customer reviews, clueQuest is amongst the top activities to do in London, and the escape games have been rated as some of the best in the UK.

The earliest escape-the-room game, called 'Origin', dates back from 2006. It was created in Silicon Valley by a group of system programmers. In the same year, similar games became popular throughout China and Japan. From 2007, the concept became a worldwide phenomenon, with over 306 companies currently running live escape games.

== Origins ==
clueQuest originally opened in June 2013 as the brainchild of four Hungarian brothers: Gabor, Peter, Gergely and Zoltan Papp. After visiting one of the world's alleged first escape rooms in Parapark, Hungary, the brothers were inspired to create their own experience for the British market.

The first clueQuest location was located in Tottenham Hale and contained clueQuest's first escape room game, PLAN52. In 2014, a second mission titled Operation Blacksheep was launched, and soon after clueQuest expanded and moved to a new location near Liverpool Street Station. In 2015, clueQuest expanded again and relocated to its current location near Kings Cross St. Pancras.

Since its move, clueQuest has continued to create new experiences. In 2016, Revenge of the Sheep was created as a step-up in difficulty from the first two missions, and in 2018, cQ:Origenes was opened, a room which aimed to challenge fans with the company's hardest mission to date.

During the COVID-19 pandemic, clueQuest was forced to temporarily close its doors and focus was instead placed on creating play-at-home games. This evolved to become their 'Print+Cut+Escape' brand, which, consisted of 10 games by 2023. They are primarily made of card or paper, and require the player to cut out the pieces that make up the game. There are different variations of the games, with Easter, Halloween, Christmas and Father's Day versions, and all centre around the story of the clueQuest characters.

In 2023, clueQuest opened its first permanent outdoor escape game, Glitch Hunters, where players use their phones to navigate London, solving puzzles as they go.

== Format ==
=== The Game ===
clueQuest revolves around the spy world of 'Mr Q', a yellow mouse who acts as the mascot of the brand. Participating teams (known as 'agents') have sixty minutes to escape the rooms using teamwork, logic, and common sense to gather clues and solve the puzzles. These games are an accessible experience for both adults and children.

=== The Missions ===
Aspiring secret agents can pick from four available indoor missions: PLAN52, Operation BlackSheep, Revenge of the Sheep, and cQ:Origenes. There is also an outdoor mission which opened in 2023, Glitch Hunters.

==== PLAN52 ====
PLAN52 is the first spy-themed mission created by clueQuest. The room first opened on 6 June 2013 in Tottenham Hale. Additional PLAN52 units were later added in December 2013 and November 2014, allowing larger groups to play the same experience whilst competing with each other. PLAN52 is a classic escape room, in which players must find the identity of a double agent working for Mr Q's arch-nemesis, Professor BlackSheep.

==== Operation BlackSheep ====
Operation BlackSheep is the second escape room that clueQuest opened, and continues the story of Professor BlackSheep's attempts to take over the world. In this mission, the Professor has launched a mind-control satellite into space, and players must work to shoot it out of the sky.

==== Revenge of the Sheep ====
Revenge of the Sheep is the third escape room launched by clueQuest, and involves characters previously seen in PLAN52 and Operation BlackSheep. In this mission, players must work to shut down the SheepMutators which transform humans into sheep, created by the Professor and his evil sidekick.

cQ:Origenes

cQ:Origenes is the fourth escape room to open at clueQuest, and is their most high-tech experience and first 3rd Generation room. When it started in 2018, it was immediately included on lists of top escape rooms in London, and the most difficult ones, too.

The mission involves players shrinking down to fit inside Mr Q's mouse-sized operations centre, finding pieces of a broken computer and stopping the Professor's plans to destroy clueQuest via computer virus.

IAMAI

IAMAI is the most recent escape room at clueQuest, launched in November 2025, and features MM7 as the protagonist. Players must repair damage to MM7 and then find the origin of and then defeat an evil AI.

==== Glitch Hunters ====
Glitch Hunters is clueQuest's first permanent outdoor puzzle game, based around the idea that the world around you is not what it seems to be. Players must make contact with a fictional informant and work together to stop Professor Blacksheep.

This game is played using mobile phones to access an online gaming system, which leads players on a trail across the City of London. The puzzles are mostly solved by comparing digital clues with their physical surroundings.

==== Print+Cut+Escape Games ====
clueQuest's Print+Cut+Escape games were first developed in 2020 in response to the COVID-19 pandemic. They combine an online interface with printed paper pieces. There are currently ten of these games available to be played, all of which feature at least one of the main cast of clueQuest characters.

Stolen IQ, Alpha Brain System, and Humanity 2.0 are the first three Print+Cut+Escape games clueQuest created, forming a trilogy. They tell the story of Lisa Hammerschmidt's attempt to take down Professor Blacksheep.

Survival Escape Training is presented as a training course for agents who need to deal with supernatural creatures, such as vampires and zombies. The contents of the game are not entirely canonical to the clueQuest universe, as it indicates that one of the main clueQuest characters is a vampire.

timeQuest is a game aimed at younger players, and features a new set of villains, the Earlybirds. The Earlybirds also make a cameo in the Christmas game, Falling Star.

Mechanics of the Heart and Codename DAD are both structured around assisting an aspiring agent: the robot MM7. In the former, the robot needs to learn about human emotions, and in the latter they need to go undercover as a DAD'O'TRON 2000.

Operation E.G.G. also features MM7 as a main character. In this game, they are presented as the player's partner in a training exercise. Operation E.G.G. was originally released at Easter time in 2021, and contains many egg related jokes.

Prison of Memories Part 1 explores the backstory of clueQuest and its central characters. It contains direct links to the story of cQ:Origenes, the most recent escape room to open at the Kings Cross location.

Falling Star is a Christmas-themed game that was originally released with more advanced graphical interfaces than the other Print+Cut+Escape games. However, the new interfaces proved to be unreliable, and so it was re-made using the original system.

== Characters ==
=== Mr Q ===
Mr Q, a yellow cartoon mouse, is the fictional leader and main character of the spy-themed world of clueQuest. Created by Gergely Papp, graphic designer and co-founder of clueQuest, Mr Q was initially a university side project, but in June 2013 he became clueQuest's mascot, with his face being the brand's recognisable logo.

Within the fictional universe, Mr Q is the mysterious leader of the crime fighting secret agency, clueQuest. His goal is to save the world and protect mankind from menacing villains, particularly his arch-nemesis Professor BlackSheep.

=== Professor BlackSheep ===
Professor BlackSheep is a villain set on taking over the world and destroying clueQuest. He is Mr Q's mortal enemy. Like Mr Q, he was originally created by Gergely Papp, and is based on the mad scientist trope often portrayed in movies and cartoons.

It is revealed in cQ:Origenes that the Professor was originally a man named Benjamin Shepherd, who was transformed into a sheep after an experiment gone wrong.

=== Mrs Q ===
Mrs Q is the wife of Mr Q and acts as the tech side of the secret agency. Due to the Universal Stem Cell Genome experiment which turned the characters into animals, she is a mouse.

=== Lord Hammerschmidt ===
Lord Hammerschmidt is Mr Q's oldest friend and closest ally. He originally helped to fund the enterprise that would eventually become the clueQuest global intelligence agency.

=== Lisa Hammerschmidt ===
Lisa is the daughter of Lord Hammerschmidt, and is an active clueQuest agent known as Agent Crimson. She is previously been instrumental in taking down several of the Professor's operations.

=== Kevin the Snail ===
A former clueQuest agent, Kevin betrayed the agency and allied himself with Professor BlackSheep. The Professor later mutated Kevin into a snail.

=== MM7 ===
Originally created to be Mr Q's robot assistant, MM7 is a mechanical mouse who has become a clueQuest field agent. He is also the lead character of several Print+Cut+Escape games.
