= Nate Martin =

American entrepreneur, game designer, and software executive

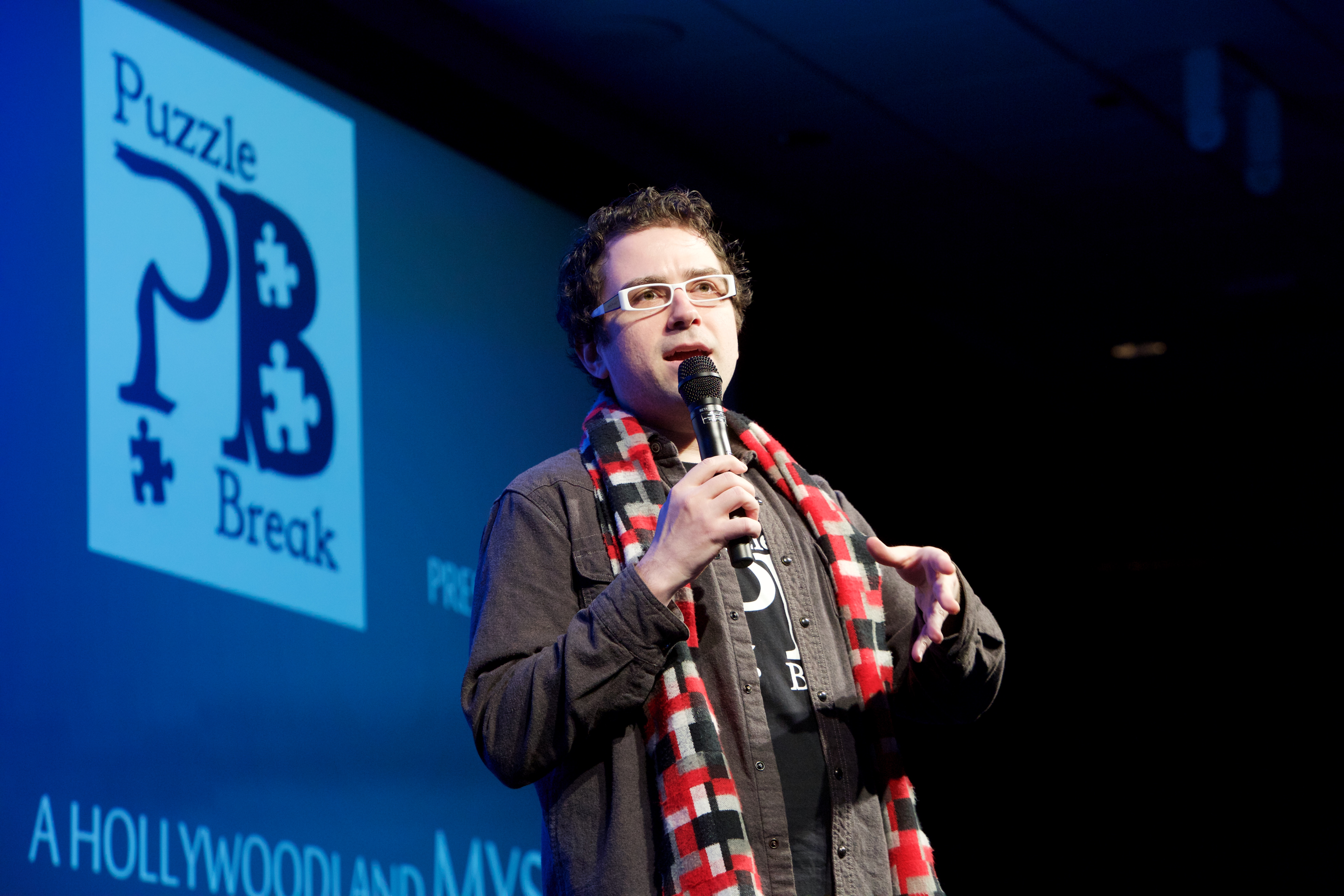
- Born: Nathan Burk Martin; January 13, 1983 (age 43); Beaver, Pennsylvania, U.S.
- Occupation: CEO
- Website: http://www.puzzlebreak.com

Nate Martin (born January 13, 1983) is an American entrepreneur, game designer, and software executive. He is the co-founder and CEO of the escape room company Puzzle Break. He is often referred to as the "Founding Father of Escape Rooms."

== Early life and education ==
He is an alumnus of the DigiPen Institute of Technology with a Bachelor of Science in Real-Time Interactive Simulation and Computer Science.

== Career ==
Martin was recruited by Microsoft early in his career and also worked as a software executive for Electronic Arts before founding Puzzle Break, the first escape room company in the United States, in 2013. Martin funded the company with an initial $7,000 investment and grew the company yearly revenue into $1 million by 2016.

Martin is a frequent lecturer and podcast guest on the topics of escape rooms, interactive entertainment, and entrepreneurship. His interviews have appeared in the New York Times, Entrepreneur Magazine, and Forbes. In 2017, he spoke on the future of experiential storytelling at the Sundance Film Festival.
