= Puzzle Break =

- Industry: Entertainment (Real-Life Escape Game)
- Founded: August 1, 2013 in Seattle, Washington, United States
- Founders: Nate Martin, Lindsay Morse
- Area served: Seattle, Washington, Long Island, New York, Newton, Massachusetts, and United States (portable games), and Royal Caribbean Cruise Line
- Products: Escape from Studio D, The Grimm Escape, Escape from Twenty Thousand Leagues, Hollywoodland Mystery, Escape from the Future, Escape the Midnight Carnival, Escape the Rubicon
- Website: puzzlebreak.us

Puzzle Break is an escape room company headquartered in Seattle, Washington, co-founded by Nate Martin and Lindsay Morse. It is the first American-based escape room company.

== History ==
Puzzle Break's first escape room, Escape from Studio D, opened in the Capitol Hill neighborhood of Seattle, Washington in August 2013. In May 2014, operations expanded to San Francisco, California with the release of its second room, The Grimm Escape. Puzzle Break was named one of Seattle Magazine's Hidden Gems in June 2014. In November 2014, Escape from Studio D was closed to make way for Puzzle Break's next project: Escape from Twenty Thousand Leagues. Escape the Midnight Carnival followed in March 2016.

On March 31, 2015, Puzzle Break announced a partnership with Royal Caribbean International to produce Escape from the Future for the MS Anthem of the Seas, the first Escape Room on a cruise ship. Escape from the Future was later confirmed to be appearing on Ovation of the Seas. On March 15, 2016, Royal Caribbean International announced a new Puzzle Break room, Escape the Rubicon, was under construction on the upcoming Harmony of the Seas. Additional construction was performed by ShowFX, Inc.

== Rooms ==
Puzzle Break participants are locked in a room for one hour and must work together to find hidden clues, solve puzzles, and escape the room. Current locations include Seattle, Washington, Syosset, New York, and Newton, Massachusetts. Most rooms are designed for 6-12 players and the entire experience is approximately 90 minutes. The escape rate for all rooms fluctuates between 15 and 20%. Puzzle Break also offers off-site escape games where they travel to customers' locations.
