= AdventureRooms =

AdventureRooms is a real-life escape the room game that was started in March 2012 as a high school project by Gabriel Palacios, a science teacher, in Bern, Switzerland. He founded the company AdventureRooms in 2013 together with his brother David Palacios. It is considered one of the pioneers of the new game concept and is one of the most famous escape games worldwide. Its main influences were adventure computer games from the 1990s, and scientific experiments from his Physics classes.

The scientific character of its games and the movie-like experience distinguishes AdventureRooms games from similar games. Another innovation was the introduction of "duels", where two teams can play the same game at the same time against each other. This game option is used for larger groups, mainly by companies for team building events.

In 2013 AdventureRooms started to offer a franchising system, and the company quickly spread around the globe. In July 2016 there were thirty-three active AdventureRooms locations worldwide.

The average escape rate amounts to about 20%.

As of July 2016, there were 33 active AdventureRooms centres: In Switzerland, Bern (founding centre, 4 games), Zurich (2 games), Lucerne (3 games), Davos (1 game) and Chur (2 games), in Germany, Cologne (1 game), Dresden (3 games) and Munich (2 games), in Austria, Vienna (2 games), in Italy, Florence (2 games), Bologna (1 game), Pavia (2 games), Perugia (3 games), Pisa (2 games) and Catania (2 games), in Spain, Palma de Mallorca (2 games) and Madrid (2 games), in Ireland, Dublin (2 games), in Oslo, Norway (3 games), in Cyprus, Nicosia (2 games), in Greece, Athens (4 games), in Estonia, Tallinn (3 games), in Qatar, Doha (2 games), in the US, Connecticut (3 games), New Jersey (2 games) and Massachusetts (2 games), in Canada, Kitchener (3 games) and Niagara Falls (2 games), in Australia, Adelaide (5 games), in France, Toulon (2 games), Pau (2 games) and Toulouse (2 games) and in Peru, Lima (2 games).
