= Escape room =

Physical puzzle game played by a team of players

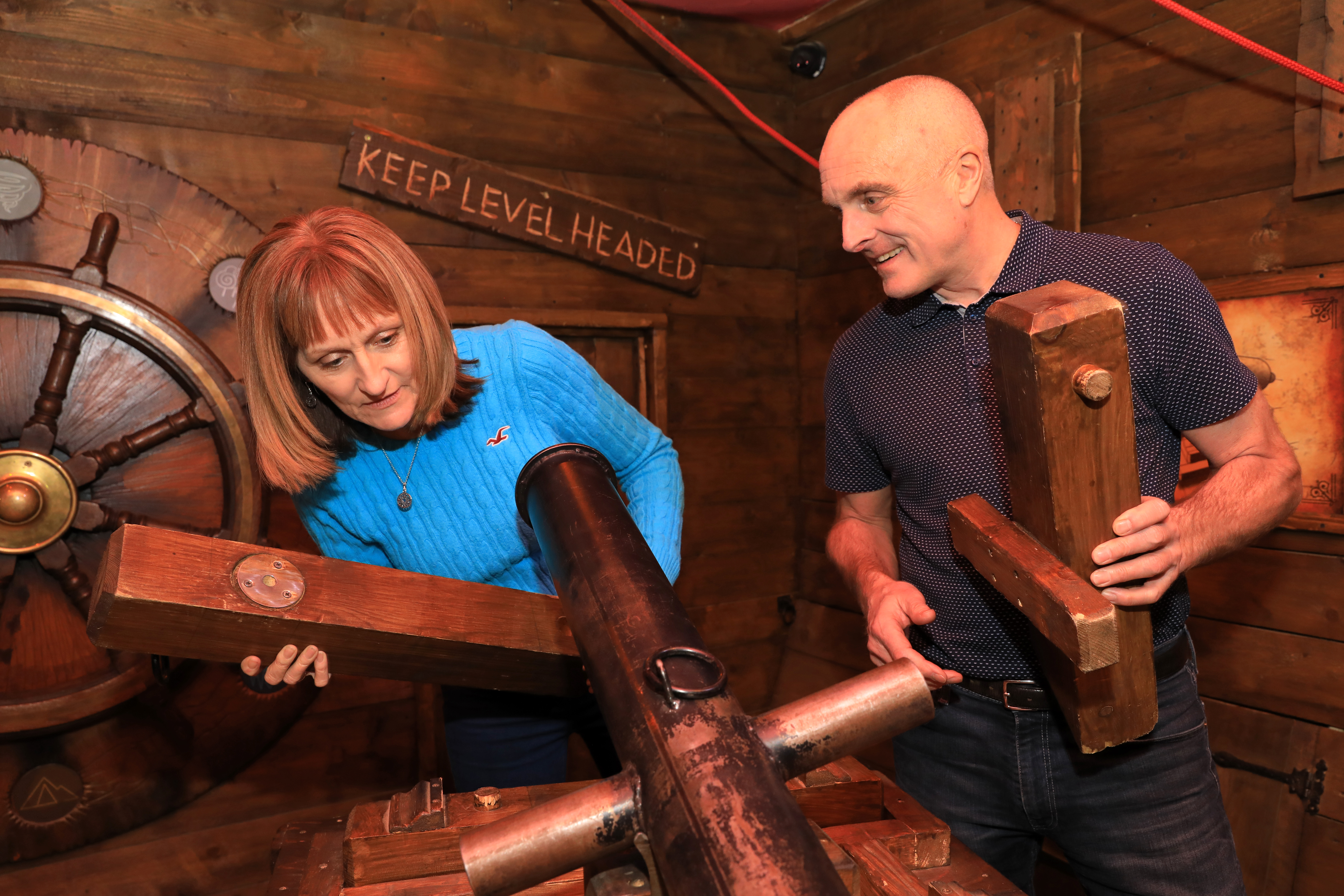
A puzzle being solved in an escape room

An escape room, also known as an escape game, puzzle room, exit game, or riddle room, is a game in which a team of players discover clues, solve puzzles, and accomplish tasks in one or more rooms in order to achieve a specific goal in a limited amount of time. The goal is often to escape the game environment.

Most escape games are cooperative, but competitive variants exist. Escape rooms became popular in North America, Europe, and East Asia in the 2010s. Permanent escape rooms in fixed locations were first opened in Asia and followed later in Hungary, Serbia, Australia, New Zealand, Russia, and South America.

== Definition ==
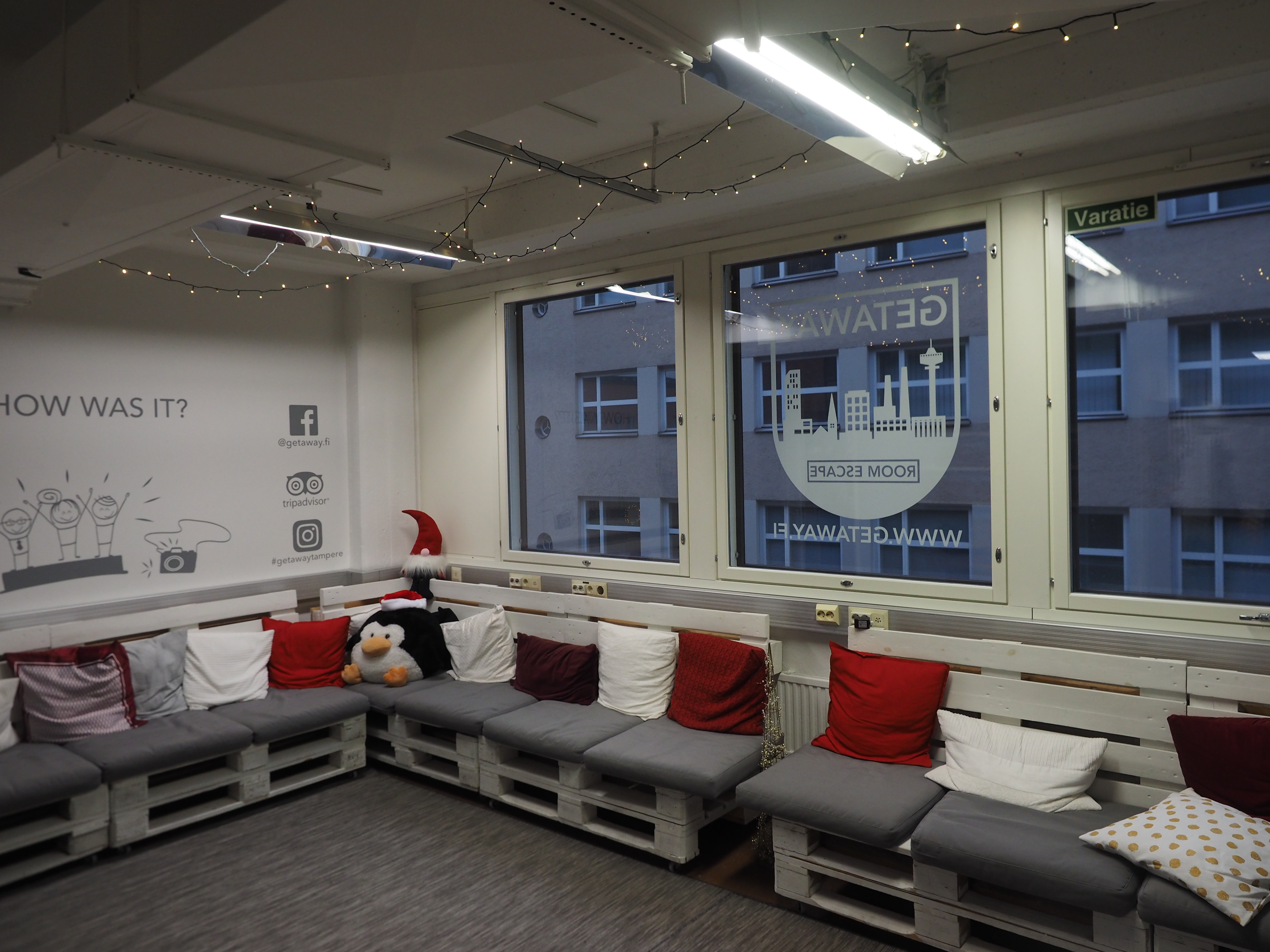
The briefing room of an escape room in Tampere, Finland

Escape rooms are inspired by escape room video games, live-action role-playing, point-and-click adventure games, puzzle hunts, interactive theater, and haunted houses. They are also referred to as "room escapes", "escape games", "exit games", or "live escapes".

In spite of the name, escaping a room may not be the main goal for the players, nor is the game necessarily confined to a single room.

=== Gameplay overview ===
The participants in an escape room normally play as a cooperative team of two to ten players. Games are set in a variety of fictional locations such as prison cells, pirate ships, and space stations. The players' goals and the challenges they encounter usually align with the theme of the room.

The game begins with a brief introduction, including safety instructions, game rules, and typically a brief backstory based on the room's theme. This can be delivered in the form of video, audio, or a live gamemaster.

Players enter a room or area where a clock is started and they have a limited time to complete the game, typically 45 to 60 minutes, while some longer rooms can go from 90 minutes to two hours. During this time, players explore, find clues, and solve puzzles that allow them to progress further in the game. Some escape rooms, especially horror-themed variants, may also include escaping from restraints such as handcuffs or zip ties. Challenges in an escape room generally are more mental than physical, and it is usually not necessary to be physically fit or dexterous. Different skills may be required for different types of puzzles, ranging from chemistry to mathematics, geography, and a basic understanding of other subjects. Well-designed escape room puzzles don't require players to have expert knowledge in any particular field; any specialized or little-known information required to solve a puzzle should be obtainable within the room itself.

If players get stuck, there may be a mechanism in place by which they can ask for hints. Hints may be delivered in written, video, or audio form, or by a live gamemaster or actor present in the room. There may be limitations on how many hints are allowed, or the use of hints may enact a type of penalty such as loss of time, depending on the location.

The players "fail" the room if they are unable to complete all of the puzzles within the allotted time, but most escape room operators strive to ensure that their customers have fun even if they do not win. Players may be given different experiences whether they succeed or fail in forms of "good endings" and "bad endings" within the room if they win or fail, respectively. Good endings are usually represented by either escaping "alive" within the time limit, completing the room's objective, or even stopping the threat or antagonist of the story, while bad endings usually represent the players getting "killed" by the main driving force of the story or an antagonist of the room coming to get the players once the timer has run out. Some venues allow players extra time or an expedited walk-through of the remaining puzzles.

Sometimes, teams with fast times are placed on a leaderboard, and records are kept for future teams to beat.

== Game design ==
An example mathematical puzzle in which gives the combination to a lock on solving it – in the interactive SMIL, solve the balance puzzle, then click the numbers at the bottom until the red circle turns green

=== Puzzle solving ===
Escape rooms test the problem-solving, lateral thinking ("thinking outside the box"), and teamwork skills of participants by providing a variety of puzzles and challenges that unlock access to new items or areas in the game when solved.

Escape room puzzles include word games, numbers, and "arranging things into patterns" such as substitution cyphers, riddles, crosswords, Sudoku, word search, and mathematics; puzzles involving physical objects such as jigsaw puzzles, matchstick puzzles, and chess; and physical activity such as searching for a hidden physical object, assembling an object, navigating mazes, or undoing a rope knot.

== History ==
Different attractions contained elements similar to modern escape rooms and could thus be seen as precursors to the idea, including haunted houses, scavenger hunts, entertainment center 5 Wits or interactive theater (such as Sleep No More, inaugurated in 2003).

The format of a room or area containing puzzles or challenges has been featured in multiple TV game shows over the years, including Now Get Out of That (1981–1984), The Adventure Game, The Crystal Maze, Fort Boyard and Knightmare. Similar experiences can be found in interactive fiction software and escape the room video games.

An additional impetus for escape rooms came from the "escape the room" genre of video games. Escape the room games, which initially began as Flash games for web browsers and then moving onto mobile apps, challenged the player to locate clues and objects within a single room.

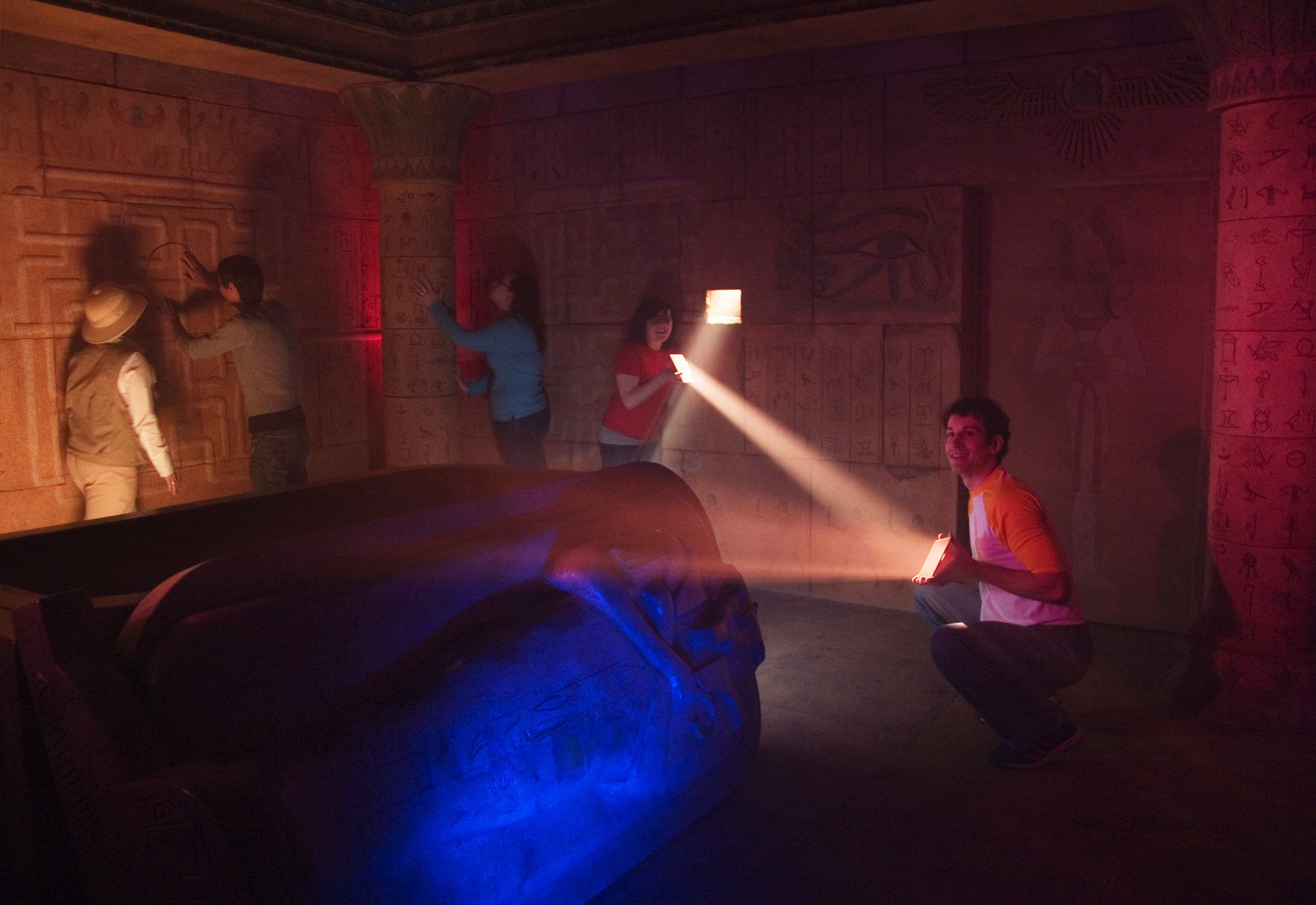
Players solve a puzzle at the original 5 Wits in downtown Boston, circa 2004

An early concept resembling modern escapes room was True Dungeon, which premiered at GenCon Indy in Indianapolis, USA, in July 2003. Created by Jeff Martin (True Adventures LLC), True Dungeon had many of the same elements that people associate with escape rooms today: a live-action team-based game where players explored a physical space and cooperatively solved mental and physical puzzles to accomplish a goal in a limited amount of time. True Dungeon "focuses on problem solving, teamwork, and tactics while providing exciting sets and interactive props".

Four years later, Real Escape Game (REG) in Japan was developed by 35-year-old Takao Kato, of the Kyoto publishing company, SCRAP Co., in 2007. It is based in Kyoto and produces a free magazine by the same name. Beyond Japan, Captivate Escape Rooms appeared in Australia and Singapore from 2011, the market growing to over 60 games by 2015. Kazuya Iwata, a friend of Kato, brought Real Escape Game to San Francisco in 2012. The following year, Seattle-based Puzzle Break founded by Nate Martin became the first American-based escape room company. Japanese games were primarily composed of logical puzzles, such as mathematical sequences or color-coding, just like the video games that inspired them.

In 2003 in Spain Differend Games opened the doors of the escape room Négone first in Getafe with "La Maquina" and then in 2005 in Madrid with "La Fuga".

Parapark, a Hungarian franchise that later operated in 20 locations in Europe and Australia, was founded in 2011 in Budapest. The founder, Attila Gyurkovics, claims he had no information about the Japanese escape games and based the game on Mihály Csíkszentmihályi's flow theory and his job experience as a personality trainer. As opposed to the Japanese precursors, in Parapark's games, players mainly had to find hidden keys or reach seemingly unattainable ones in order to advance.

In 2012, the Swiss physics teacher Gabriel Palacios created a scientific escape game for his students. The game was later offered to the public under the name AdventureRooms and distributed as a franchise in twenty countries. AdventureRooms introduced scientific puzzles (e.g. hidden infrared or polarized codes) to the genre.

In Singapore, escape rooms have been available since the mid-2010s and have been marketed both as leisure attractions and as corporate team-building activities. Lost SG, a franchise of the Hong Kong-based Lost escape room brand, opened in Singapore in late 2014 and features technology-heavy themed rooms such as "Alcatraz" and "Aokigahara". Local lifestyle and team-building media have highlighted its thriller-style narratives, use of automation for puzzles, and suitability for families and corporate groups.

2017 marked the launch of competitive escape room solving on a worldwide scale, with two different global competitions. ER Champ (2017 - present) launched initially as "Poland Escape" and quickly grew in scale to a worldwide annual contest with thousands of competitors per year. Every year, teams of up to four can compete in an online qualifier round, with the finalists traveling to compete in a physical escape room. Another contest, Red Bull Escape Room World Championship (2017-2019), challenged one team from each country to be the fastest solvers of an escape room contest.

As of November 2019, there were estimated to be over 50,000 escape rooms worldwide. Business reports cited escape rooms as potentially having high profits, with low upfront investment costs compared to high hourly rates charged to players. As the industry has grown, start up costs have increased dramatically and so has the competition. Some customers now expect higher production values and games can cost over $50,000 to create.

== Reception ==
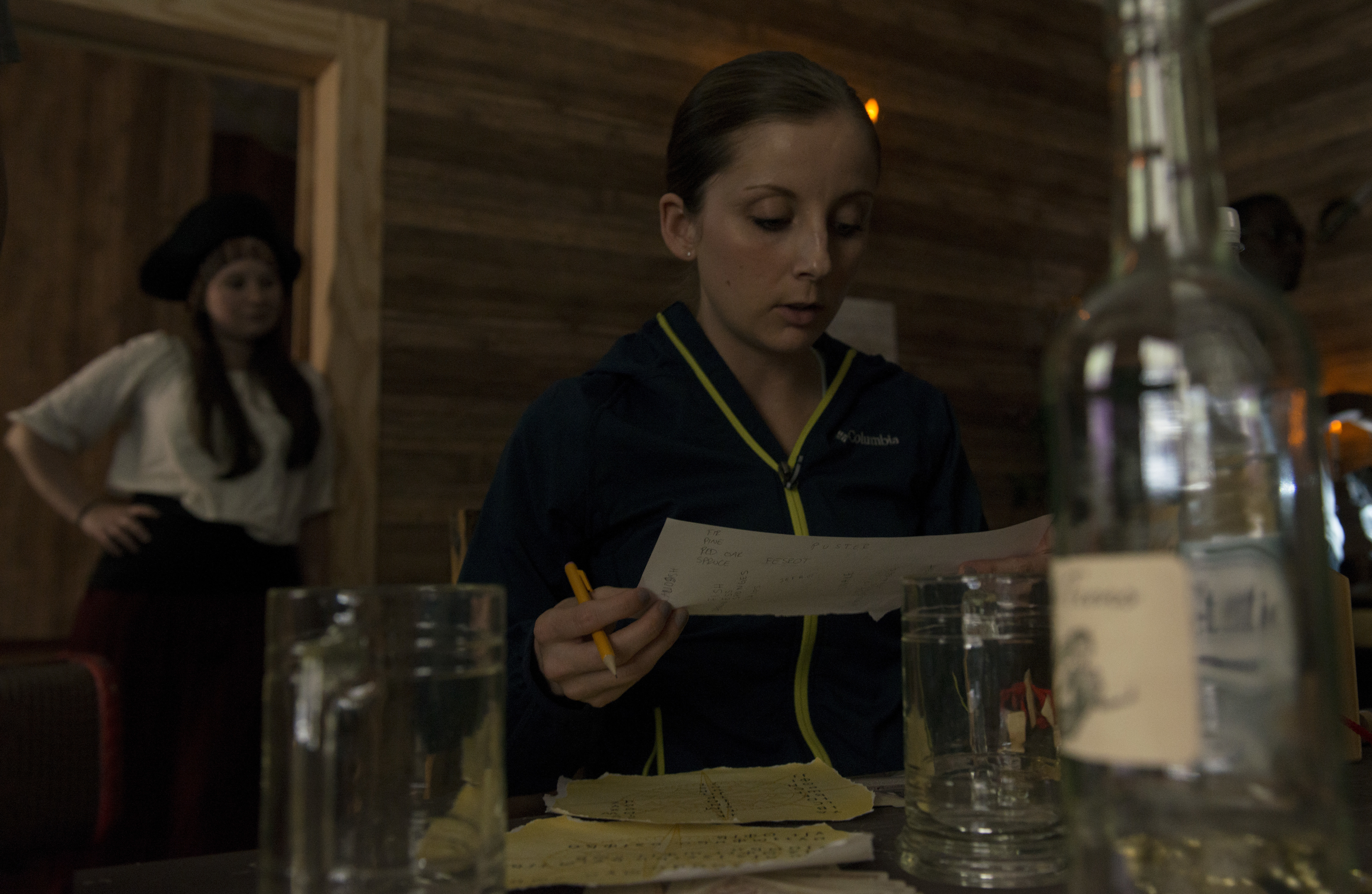
A player studying a clue

The South China Morning Post described escape rooms as a hit among "highly stressed students and overworked young professionals." Sometimes players damage equipment or decorations inside the game area.

The use of Hong Kong room escapes as distractions from the city's living conditions has been commented on by local journalists.

== Evolution ==
Early games consisted mainly of puzzles that were solved with paper and pencil. Some versions are digital or printable only. As escape rooms became more sophisticated, physical locks were introduced that could be opened by finding combinations, hidden keys, and codes using objects found in the rooms. These ideas have evolved to include automation technology, immersive decoration, and more elaborate storylines to make puzzles more interactive, and to create an experience that is more theatrical and atmospheric.

Some escape rooms have begun to incorporate elements such as virtual reality, live actors, and branching paths that change the experience based on the players' decisions.

== Safety ==
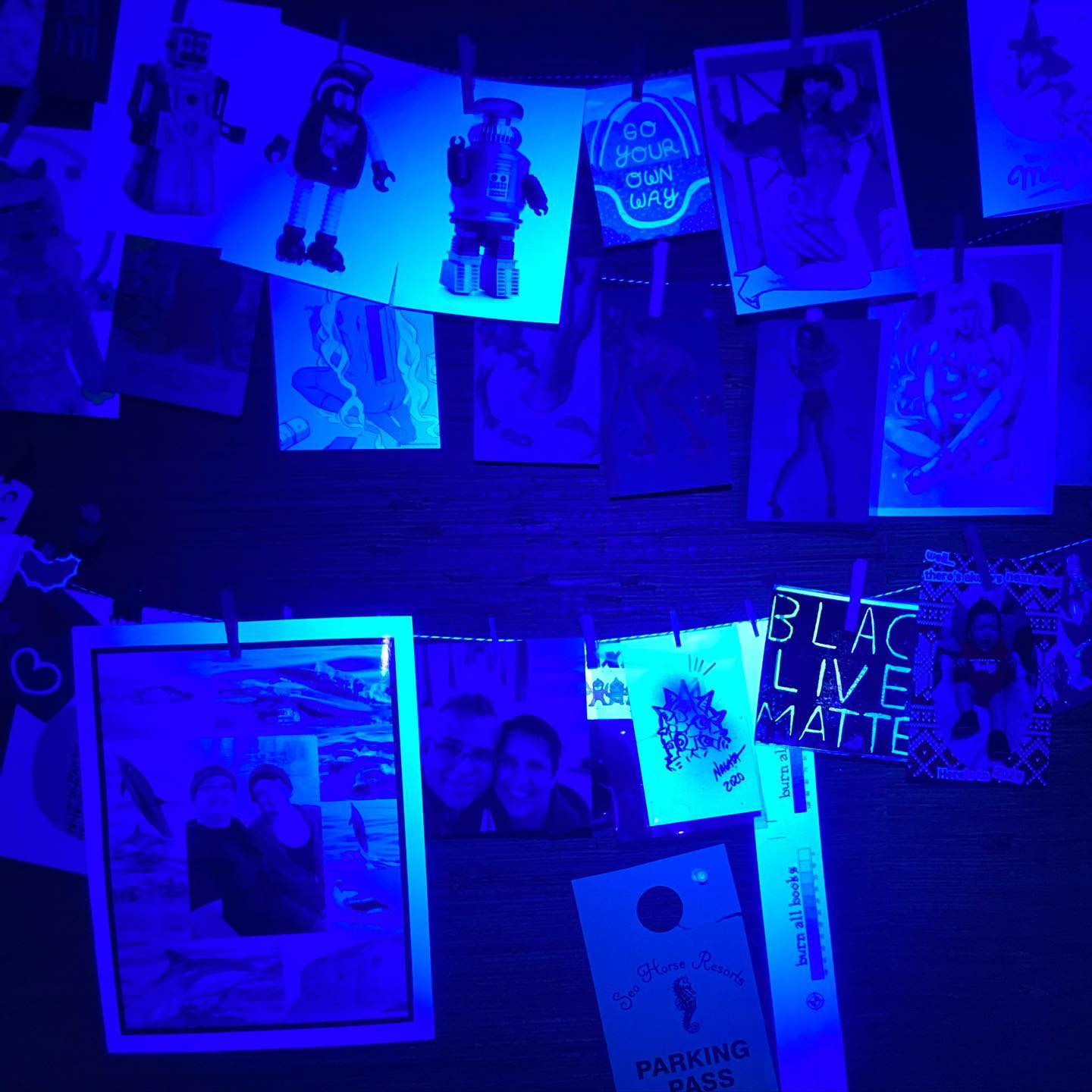
A common task is to find parts of an eye-safe blacklight torch to assemble to reveal messages in invisible ink

The first known fatal accident to occur in an escape room was the death of five 15-year-old girls in a fire in Koszalin, Poland, on January 4, 2019. The fire was caused by a leaky gas container inside a heater and resulted in the death of the five victims from carbon monoxide poisoning. One employee was treated for burns. According to the state firefighting service, the chief failure that led to the deaths was the lack of an effective evacuation route. Shortly after the accident, authorities ordered safety checks in escape rooms across Poland and 13 more such establishments were shut down for safety flaws as a result.

== In popular culture ==
Reno 911, an American comedy show, aired the episode "Escape-O-Rama Room" in August 2020. Canadian comedy show Schitt's Creek aired an escape room episode, "The Bachelor Party", in March 2020. The Big Bang Theory, an American comedy, aired an escape room episode, "The Intimacy Acceleration", in 2015. In 2023, the Dropout game show Game Changer aired the episode "Escape the Greenroom".

The escape room concept has also been explored in other television programs such as It's Always Sunny in Philadelphia, Bob's Burgers, and Harley Quinn.

In 2019, the American psychological horror film Escape Room was released in theaters, and its sequel Escape Room: Tournament of Champions came out in 2021 following several delays due to the COVID-19 pandemic. Both films deal with a mysterious, deadly series of puzzle rooms that explore the traumatic pasts of its players. Escape Room grossed $155.7 million worldwide against a production budget of $9 million, and Tournament of Champions grossed $51.8 million.

In February 2022, the children's book Escape Room by Christopher Edge was named "Children's Book of the Week" by The Times.

Escape rooms started reaching new audiences through the TikTok app. Escape room companies such as Exit Game OC, Breakout Games and Amazing Escape Room have found new customers through organic viral TikTok videos.

== See also ==
- Escape Game (company)
