= List of The Dumping Ground characters =

British television characters

This is a list of characters introduced in CBBC's The Dumping Ground. The series is based on The Story of Tracy Beaker by Jacqueline Wilson. It premiered on 4 January 2013. The series follows The Story of Tracy Beaker, which ran for five series from 2002 to 2005, and Tracy Beaker Returns, which ran for three series from 2010 to 2012. Connor Byrne has played the role of Mike Milligan for all four programmes, although Mike leaves in series 7, episode 24 to live with his family in Ireland. He returned in the last episode of the last season of The Beaker Girls.

== Cast ==
Character	Actor	Series															
Character	Actor	Series 1 (2013)	Christmas Special (2013)	Series 2 (2014)	Series 3 (2015)	Series 4 (2016)	Series 5 (2017)	Series 6 (2018)	Series 7 (2019)	Series 8 (2020–2021)	Series 9 (2021–2022)	Series 10 (2022–2023)	Series 11 (2024)	Series 12 (2024)	Series 13 (2025)	Series 14 (2026)	Series 15 (2027)
Michael 'Mike' Milligan	Connor Byrne	Main	Main	Main	Main	Main	Main	Main	Main								
Gina Conway	Kay Purcell	Main															
Carmen Howle	Amy-Leigh Hickman	Main	Main	Main	Main	Main											
Tee Taylor	Mia McKenna-Bruce	Main	Main	Main	Main	Main	Guest	Guest									
Johnny Taylor	Joe Maw	Main	Main	Main	Main		Guest										
Harry Jones	Philip Graham Scott	Main	Main	Main	Main	Main											
Frank Matthews	Chris Slater	Main	Main	Main	Guest		Guest	Guest									
Lily Kettle	Jessie Williams	Main	Main	Main				Guest				Guest					
Mandy 'Elektra' Perkins	Jessica Revell	Main					Guest			Guest							
Tyler Lewis	Miles Butler-Hughton	Main	Main	Main	Main	Main	Main	Main	Main	Main	Guest						
Ricardo 'Rick' Barber	Daniel Pearson	Main	Main	Main													
Jody Jackson	Kia Pegg	Main	Main	Main	Main	Main	Main	Main	Main	Main	Main	Main					
Gus Carmichael	Noah Marullo	Main															
Faith Davis	Leanne Dunstan	Main	Main	Main	Guest												
Floss Guppy	Sarah Rayson	Main	Main	Main	Main	Main	Main	Main	Main	Main	Main	Main					
Anthony 'Mo' Michaels	Reece Buttery	Main	Main	Main	Main	Main											
May-Li Wang	Stacy Liu		Main	Main	Main	Main	Main	Main	Main	Main	Main	Main					
Bailey Wharton	Kasey McKellar			Main	Main	Main	Main	Guest									
Kazima Tako	Akuc Bol			Main	Main	Main	Main					Guest					
Liam O'Donovan	Richard Wisker			Guest				Guest									
Ryan Reeves	Lewis Hamilton				Main	Main	Main	Main	Main								
Billie Trent	Gwen Currant				Main	Main	Main	Guest				Guest					
Toni Trent	Nelly Currant				Main	Main	Main	Guest				Guest					
Mischief	Sage				Recurring	Recurring	Recurring										
Finn McLaine	Ruben Reuter				Main	Main	Main	Main	Main	Main	Recurring	Recurring	Guest				
Sasha Bellman	Annabelle Davis				Main	Main	Main	Main	Main	Main	Main						
Dexter Bellman	Alexander Aze				Guest	Guest	Main	Recurring									
Murphy Bellman	Thomas and Oliver Waldram				Guest												
Murphy Bellman	Fred Montgomery Scott					Guest											
Murphy Bellman	Lenny Rush										Main						
Chloe Reeves	Hannah Moncur					Main	Main	Main	Main	Main	Main						
Joseph Stubbs	Yousef Naseer					Main	Main	Main									
Archibald 'Archie' Able	Jethro Baliba					Main	Main	Main									
Courtney 'Candi-Rose'	Carma Hylton						Main	Main	Main	Main	Main	Main					
Alex Walker	Connor Lawson						Main	Main	Main	Guest		Guest					
Tazmin 'Taz' De Souza	Jasmine Uson						Main	Main	Main	Main	Main	Main					
Charlotte 'Charlie' Morris	Emily Burnett						Main	Main	Main								
Noah 'Bird' Wallis	Leo James							Main	Main	Main	Main	Main					
Jacob 'Jay' Wallis	Cole Wealleans-Watts							Main	Main	Main	Main	Main					
Tracy Beaker	Dani Harmer							Guest							Guest		
Sid Khan	Josh Sangha								Main	Main	Main	Main		Main	Main		
Rebecca 'Bec' Hyde	Ava Potter								Main	Main	Main						
Katy White	Anya Cooke								Main	Main	Main						
Scott Murray	Louis Payne									Main	Main						
Viv	Chloe Lea									Main							
Ruby Butler	Liv De-Vulgt									Guest	Main						
Max Riley	Jed Jefferson									Main	Main						
Clementine 'Clem' Stephens	Halle Cassell										Main	Main					
Kyle Lawton	Freddy Smith										Main	Main					
Ben Pratt	William Wyn Davies											Main	Main	Main	Main		
Bonnie Vasiliou	Lara Mehmet											Main	Main	Main	Main	Main	
Fraser Vasiliou	Massimo Cull											Main	Main	Main			
Sabrina Moxley	Florrie Wilkinson											Main	Main				
Hugo Little	Hugo Nash											Main					
Wesley 'Wes' Oldfield	Owen Phillips											Main	Main	Main	Main		
Doreen Adebayo	Andrea Hall											Main	Main	Main	Main		
Maisie Martin	Mimi Robertson											Guest	Main	Main	Main	Main	
Izzy Musonda	Zanele Nyoni											Main	Main	Main	Main		
Dita Okomo	Kayleen Ngeuma											Main	Main	Main			
Frankie Hodgeson	Blake Robinson												Main	Main	Main	Main	Main
Oscar Norris	Michael Carpenter												Main	Main	Main	Main	Main
Shanice Omondi	Raniah Morton												Main	Main	Main	Main	Main
Georgia Finch	Rochelle Goldie												Main	Main			
Erin	Robyn Elwell												Main	Main	Main	Guest	
Chelsey Watts	Emme Patrick												Main	Main	Main		
Jimi	Moses Amuzdo												Main	Main	Main		
Brodie	Charlie Geany												Main	Main	Main		
Keira	Eden Patrick													Recurring	Recurring		
Harmony	Alexandra Perez Ramos														Main	Main	Main
Phoenix	Marni Moore														Recurring	Main	Main
Anne Costello	Paula Penman														Main	Main	Main
Bernie	Dave Johns														Recurring	Recurring	Recurring
Sami	Joseph Oshiotse														Main		
Hana Sakamoto	Kanon Narumi														Main	Main	Main
Vinny	Henry Wright														Main	Main	Main
Joshua "Josh" Jeremiah Tersoo	Ebube Chukwuma															Main	Main
Tara	Lily Mae Swift															Main	Main
Kav	Ashwin Sakthivel															Main	Main
Zack	Lucas Lees															Main	Main
Willow	Matilda Rose Walton															Main	Main

== Main characters ==
=== Faith Davis ===
Faith Davis
- Tracy Beaker character
- Portrayed by: Leanne Dunstan
- Duration: 2013–2015
- First appearance: Freedom; 4 January 2013
- Last appearance: "Better Than You"; 21 October 2015
- Introduced by: Foz Allan
In-universe information
- Brothers: Razz Davis

Faith Davis is a resident of Elm Tree House and Ashdene Ridge during the first two series of The Dumping Ground. She is portrayed by Leanne Dunstan. Faith, who shares a room with Elektra while at Elm Tree House, is one of the older children. She tries to be responsible, and proves her capabilities and maturity when she acts as a surrogate care worker in the opening episode of The Dumping Ground. She is 16 in series two.

In "The Real Faith Davis", a police visit prompts the residents to spread rumours that Faith is a drug dealer. She explains that the police may have found the body of her missing brother, Razz. Frank uses this information to attract sponsors for her charity run, upsetting Faith. She tells Elektra that she entered care after telling a teacher that she lived alone. When the police confirm that the body is not Razz's, Faith hides in the garden, where Floss comforts her. She completes the charity run the following day with everyone's support. In the second series, Faith temporarily uses a wheelchair after being hit by a car. Although usually optimistic and ambitious, she fears that she will never walk or run again and becomes aggressive towards the younger children. She makes Harry and Floss clean her room in exchange for a "prize", teases Harry and orders Mo, Floss and Harry out of the lounge so that she can watch a film. When Mo threatens to tell Mike, Faith calls him an informer. Frank challenges her behaviour, reminding her that she will recover, while he has to speak slowly every day to be understood. Faith returns to her caring manner, although she is occasionally irritable in later episodes.

Faith is one of the older residents and is tall for her age, with long black hair. She wants to be a distance runner when she grows up, but a car accident in "Booting Up" temporarily halts her plans. She leaves the series at the end of the second series of The Dumping Ground. Dunstan returns as Faith for one episode of the third series. In series 5, Faith does not appear. However, in "#SaveTheDG", Tee mentions that Faith made a £50 donation to help keep the 'Dumping Ground' running.

=== Floss Guppy ===
Floss Guppy
- Tracy Beaker character
- Portrayed by: Sarah Rayson
- Duration: 2013–2023
- First appearance: "The Real Faith Davis"; 1 February 2013
- Last appearance: "Life Is What You Bake It"; 9 June 2023
- Introduced by: Foz Allan
In-universe information
- Occupation: Owner of Kettle Stand Café (2023-)
- Mother: Jen
- Siblings: Ross Maydons

Floss Guppy, portrayed by Sarah Rayson, made her first appearance on 1 February 2013 in series 1 of The Dumping Ground during the episode "The Real Faith Davis". She remains in the series until her departure in series 10.

Floss is in care because her mother abandoned her in a nail salon when she was 18 months old. Her mother was young and could not cope with raising her. Floss is good friends with Finn McLaine and Toni and Billie Trent. She is initially wary of Harry, who unintentionally scares her with stories of incidents at Elm Tree House, but they eventually become friends. She also takes his toy giraffe, Jeff.

series 1 Floss does not appear much or have many major storylines in series 1 of The Dumping Ground. She arrives at Elm Tree House midway through the series and meets Harry, who gives her a tour around the house. When they reach Harry's room, Floss is drawn to Jeff and asks to hold him. Harry agrees and tries to get Jeff back from her but she refuses, only agreeing to put him back after the tour is over. During the tour, Harry tells Floss about the bad things that happened (such as Lily falling off the roof and Tee falling out of a tree) which scares her off. She ends up in the garden and comforts Faith (who had gotten news about her brother). Faith convinces Floss to go find Harry after telling her that Harry is a good boy. She reunites with Harry and, along with Mike, paints Floss' bedroom to look like the jungle. Floss claims it is for Jeff because he wants to move in. Harry tries to get Jeff back but Floss blackmails Harry into letting her keep Jeff by threatening to tell Mike that Harry scared Floss off. He gives up as Floss smirks in victory.

series 2 In "Kick Off", Floss and Harry decided to continuously take sweets from Tyler's diet plan bucket, after Bailey said Tyler needed to lose weight. Floss was later sick after eating too many sweets.

In "Experience", Carmen uses Floss to sabotage the documentary Jody is making for new social workers about children in care. Instead of discussing life in care, Floss follows Carmen's advice and tells Jody about her sock puppets, Millie and Bob, frustrating Jody.

In "The Barbecue", Lily tells Carmen that her family is moving to Brighton to run her stepmother's sister's seaside cafe. In anger, Carmen kicks Bailey's football through Johnny's bedroom window and leaves before Bailey arrives. Johnny sees Bailey outside and accuses him of breaking the window. Carmen is afraid to confess, unaware that Floss witnessed the incident. Mike contacts the insurer and learns that the damage is considered criminal damage rather than an accident. May-Li also learns that replacing the window could be expensive. Although Mike does not intend to involve the police, Johnny overhears and calls them himself. Before Lily's farewell barbecue, Mo answers the door to two police officers, who arrest Bailey. Carmen watches without admitting responsibility. Floss then demands the "silver dog" necklace Lily gave Carmen as a farewell present in exchange for keeping quiet. Lily had joked that the charm resembled her dog, Shadow, despite having too many legs. Carmen reluctantly gives Floss the necklace. At the barbecue, Lily notices Floss wearing it and asks Carmen why she gave it away. Carmen confesses to breaking the window, and Lily is appalled that she allowed Bailey to be arrested. Carmen asks Mike to take her to the police station to confess. Later, May-Li brings Floss to Lily to apologise and return the necklace. Lily forgives her and asks her to look apologetic for a photograph.

In "Be My Girl", Floss meets some prospective parents. She starts to think about her mother. When a boy in the park taunts her about not having a mother, Floss loses her temper and pushes him and his ice cream to the ground. Floss' potential foster parents shout at Floss, upsetting her. May-Li reveals that Floss is in care because she was abandoned by her mother in a nail salon, when she was 18 months old; this is why she is so attached to nail varnish. At the foster parents' house they ask her to remove her nail varnish, causing Floss to throw food around. Floss tells all the people at the 'Dumping Ground' that whilst there is a chance her mother might return, she will wait.

In series 3, Floss took up dancing. In "Party Games", during an open day for potential foster parents to get to know the children in Ashdene Ridge, Floss performed a dance routine to impress the couples and earn money by busking.

In series 4 she has a major storyline in the episode "Troll". In this episode, fearing that she is being overlooked after Harry's departure, she comes up with an idea which she hopes will make her the centre of attention, but it upsets Finn.

In series 5, she gets a chance to star in a commercial playing the daughter of a woman. Having grown up without her mother, she struggles with the role but eventually performs it well. Although she initially decides to be fostered, she quickly changes her mind when she realises that everyone else cares about her.

Floss is a bubbly young girl, with short curly ginger hair and green eyes. She is very mischievous and can be manipulative, always doing what she can to get what she wants. Although she is very sarcastic and can be rude, she has a good heart and wants to be loved deep down.

In series 8, it is revealed via a DNA test that Ross is her twin brother and her mother's name is Jane Sadler, making her real last name Sadler. They go in search of their mother on their own, following an address that turns out to be incorrect.

In series 9, Floss is given the chance to meet her real mother and ask her the questions she has always wanted to know answers to. However, when she realises that her mother is not coming to take her out of care, she becomes upset and decides to cut contact with her.

In series 10, she enters a baking competition in the hopes of getting into a baking academy. While she does not win, Lily (who was judging the contest) offers to let Floss take ownership of one of her cafes, which also has a flat above it. Floss accepts and moves out of The Dumping Ground, with her friends, both old and new, surprising her at the cafe.

=== Mo Michaels ===
Mo Michaels
- Tracy Beaker character
- Portrayed by: Reece Buttery
- Duration: 2013–2016
- First appearance: "Oh, Mo!"; 1 March 2013
- Last appearance: "Two For Joy"; 2 December 2016
- Introduced by: Foz Allan
In-universe information
- Occupation: Student
- Father: Peter Michaels
- Mother: Caroline Michaels
- Adoptive father: David Michaels
- Grandfathers: David Michaels

Anthony "Mo" Michaels, portrayed by Reece Buttery, made his first appearance on 1 March 2013 in series 1 of The Dumping Ground during the episode "Oh, Mo!". He departed in series 4.

Mo is a kind, eccentric child in the 'Dumping Ground'. He first appeared in "Oh, Mo!" He is ten years old in series 3 of The Dumping Ground. In series 4, Mo is annoyed by younger residents like Joseph.

The Dumping Ground series 1 – Mo arrives at Elm Tree House before "Oh, Mo!" and shares a room with Tyler. Mo collects rubbish from bins, calling it "treasure", and uses it for arts and crafts. His collection fills their bedroom, frustrating Tyler, who eventually throws it down the stairs. Mo is told to move his collection to the attic, and Tyler moves into Rick's room. Delighted to have a room to himself, Mo tries to hug Tyler. While most of the residents are out, Mo takes belongings from their rooms and, with Floss's help, uses jam to attract ants to them, creating an "Ant Theme Park". The other residents become angry, but Tee intervenes. Later, Mo offers to build a scarecrow from his collection to protect Gina's vegetables. Tee helps him settle in by assisting with the project. Mo declares her his best friend and follows her around, annoying her and amusing the other residents. The following morning, Mo wants to give Tee his grandmother's pearls, which Jody and Elektra have stolen. Unable to find them, he asks Tee for help. Frustrated, Tee destroys the scarecrow with a cricket bat, but it falls on Mo, who has followed her. Mo is taken to hospital, and Mike plans to move him into emergency foster care because he has struggled to settle at Elm Tree House. The others recognise that Mo has had a difficult start in life, like them, and rebuild the scarecrow as a welcome-home present. Jody returns the pearls, to Elektra's annoyance, so Mo can give them to Tee. Tee initially refuses but eventually accepts them.

In "Seriously Funny", Tee and Carmen left for a sleepover at Lily's flat, and Mo gave Tee a hug (as he was fond of doing) as the girls hugged each other. After the girls left, he said that he wished he could go. The following day, Mo took Tyler's practical joke toys on learning that Tyler no longer wished to play practical jokes.

Prior to "Scary Beasts", Mo purchased a "magic" egg, thinking that it would hatch into a bird. One night, the egg hatched. Mo declared this to the house the following morning, declaring that it had hatched into a bird and it had gone missing. It later transpired that Mo's "bird" was in fact a snake, which Johnny and Elektra found. Mo decided to call his snake "Mike", which the others joked would lead to confusion.

The Dumping Ground series 2 – When Faith is admitted to hospital, Mo makes her a get-well card and gets glitter on his face. On her return, he tells her that the residents have prepared a surprise. Hearing her angrily throwing things around her room because she needs a wheelchair, he doubts that she will appreciate his invention, a watering can attached to a pole. Later, Mo uses one of Bailey's football boots to make prints, but Tyler and Rick take it because they are trying to sell the boots. The following day, Mo, Harry and Floss are watching television when Faith orders them out so that she can watch a film. When a training video for care children was being filmed at the 'Dumping Ground', Mo was given an old camera for him to use. After getting the camera to work, Mo filmed the other residents (including Johnny making a "Care Kid Sandwich") which was later seen by the lady making the training video. On the day of Lily's leaving barbecue, Carmen tricked Mo into thinking that there was gold underneath the potatoes in the vegetable patch, in order to avoid her chores. Later that day, Mo found a golden wrapper in the vegetable patch and believed it to be treasure (when really it was from one of Floss's sweets). On the day the older residents went out to look for Frank, Mo was due to have a dentist appointment. Mo, fearing the dentist, hid in the garden, but was found by Floss and Harry. Mo was coaxed out, only for a bird to poo on him. Harry cheered up Mo, saying that being pooed on by a bird was lucky (something Sapphire had told him). Mo then found a pound coin on the ground and was then told by May-Li that his appointment had been cancelled as the dentist was ill. On learning that Frank had gone missing, Mo, Floss and Harry waited for birds to poo on them, thinking that the lucky bird poo would lead to Frank being found. However, this initially did not work as Mo ended up chasing the birds away by running toward them and shouting at them to pick him. Instead, Floss had Mo and Harry untie one of May-Li's washing lines while she took bread to attract the birds while May-Li was distracted. Consequently, all three children were punished (by being made to tidy up the garden and take the sheets in) when May-Li discovered what had happened with the bread. Some time afterwards, the other 'DG' residents teased Mo's snake, now renamed "Rocky", saying that he was boring. Out to prove otherwise, Mo purchased a box of locusts that escaped after Mike removed the tape from the box and left it on the piano with the lid open. Consequently, Mo, with Harry and Floss, set about rounding up the more than 50 locusts from other places in the 'Dumping Ground'. After finally rounding them up, Mo revealed to the rest of the 'DG' why he had bought them: they were bait for Rocky to perform tricks in a show he was putting on. Rocky refused to respond to Mo's commands (despite having responded in practice) even when Mo attempted to charm him with a recorder. Faith later suggested to Mo that Rocky was depressed, prompting Mo to give Rocky to a man who owned numerous other snakes, on the reasoning that Mo could play with his friends whenever he wanted and so wanted to let Rocky do the same thing. When the 'DG' residents held the "Touch The Telly" challenge, Mo was the only care child to not pick a side. Instead, he was appointed the referee and was responsible for seeing who was out of the game, how long people had taken on their toilet breaks and how many they had been on. Like the other children, Mo fell asleep in the lounge the following night and saw neither the football game nor the talent show. In "I Have a Dream", the DG residents were informed of a short story competition and May-Li decided to hold a competition in the house and would send off the winning entry. Mo decided that he wanted to submit a story, but had trouble deciding what to write about (though he did get as far as the first line "I like cheese"). He was also made to go shopping with Bailey, whom he annoyed by asking who decided where everything in the supermarket was positioned. Mo later pestered Bailey by asking why he had not yet read his letter, saying that he would be excited to receive one, and eventually realised that Bailey was dyslexic, going on to say that his father was dyslexic and that he had to read letters for him. Bailey initially denied being dyslexic, then later asked for Mo's help in reading it (albeit, claiming he could not read it because the writing was untidy). Mo then decided to help Bailey write a short story at the cost of writing his own story. However, Mo revealed the plot when he started reading Bailey's story and when Carmen read the story for herself, she wondered how Mo could have known the plot if Bailey had written the story. This led to Johnny accusing Bailey of bullying Mo to write his story, Mo shouted that they had misunderstood and stormed out, later telling May-Li about Bailey's difficulty reading. Bailey went on to win the competition and won tickets for himself and another person to take with him, so he picked Mo, who proceeded to hug him. When Harry was told that he could not go to a wrestling tournament, he came up with the idea of having a wrestling tournament with one of the other 'DG' children. Mo declined to be Harry's opponent, but they both went to find Tyler, who agreed to be the announcer. Later, after Harry had had his costume made by Tee, Mo suggested that Harry have a tattoo on his face, which he agreed to. On learning that Floss was to be adopted, Mo asked her if she would still live at the 'DG', only to be told by Harry that adoption meant Floss would be leaving and never returning. This upset Mo, who told May-Li that she needed to turn away any parents who wanted to adopt him, to which May-Li said to him that Mo was not going to be adopted and was only living at Ashdene Ridge until his parents were fit to take care of him. Some time afterwards, when Liam came to the 'Dumping Ground' to look for Frank, Mo answered the door to him. When asked where Frank was, Mo told Liam that he was at the cinema with Johnny, prompting Liam to leave, despite Mo offering to get Mike. Later when Liam came to temporarily stay at the 'DG', Mo's part in the plan to get Faith her work placement back was to sing "Twelve Tiny Hours" (a song Liam had written) with Johnny and Rick, but Mo's singing was so atrocious he decided that he did not want to sing at all.

The Dumping Ground series 3 – On the day of the 'Dumping Ground's' open day in "Party Games", Mo helped to add food colouring to some cupcakes for the guests. Later in the day; however, Mo decided to run a bath and poured in the food colouring that he had used on the cupcakes. The water overflowed the bath, fell into the living room downstairs (soaking Matt, Stephanie Brantston and Carmen) and also soaked Johnny's bedroom as well. Mo was caught after he tried to leave the living room and was made to show his hands which were coloured red by the food colouring. Mo explained that he did this to stop the fostering party and prevent Carmen being fostered by the Brantstons, calling them "nasty people". The day after "Grand Theft DG", Mo is made to share a room with Ryan. He finds the missing purses in a bin outside the home and plans to tell Mike. Ryan persuades him to show him first, then warns that the police might blame Mo because his fingerprints will be on the purses. Tee eventually persuades Mo to explain what happened, but the purses have disappeared when they search the bins. Ryan denies moving them. Later, Tee records a conversation in the attic between Ryan and Maude Gordon, Harry's prospective foster sister, who stole the money. Mo follows Tee and sneezes, alerting Ryan, who persuades Maude to confess. In "Stuck With You", Kazima notices that Mo is feeling down and buys him a "Build Your Own Robot" kit from a neighbourhood yard sale to cheer him up. When Mo discovers that pieces are missing, he becomes more upset and shouts at her. He locks himself in Faith's old bedroom and builds a fort from boxes containing her belongings, but the boxes collapse on him. Mike and May-Li rescue him. Mo explains that he has received a letter from the man he believes to be his father, saying that the woman he believes to be his mother needs surgery. Mike reads the letter and reassures Mo that the operation is nothing to worry about. In "Where Is Love?", the couple are revealed to be Mo's grandparents.

Mo's last appearance was in the series 4 finale "Two For Joy". It was mentioned in the first episode of series 5 that Mo had moved back in with his grandfather.

=== May-Li Wang ===
May-Li Wang
- Tracy Beaker character
- Portrayed by: Stacy Liu
- Duration: 2013–2023
- First appearance: "Jody in Wonderland"; 16 December 2013
- Last appearance: "Life Is What You Bake It"; 9 June 2023
- Introduced by: Lis Steele
In-universe information
- Occupation: Head Care Worker (S8–S10); Care worker (S2–S7)
- Wife: Alice
- Sons: Henry
- Adoptive sons: Jake
- Adoptive daughters: Ivette
- Grandmothers: PoPo
- First cousins: Jing

May-Li Wang, portrayed by Stacy Liu, made her first appearance on 16 December 2013 in the Christmas special episode "Jody in Wonderland", between series 1 and series 2 of The Dumping Ground. She joins after Gina leaves for a better-paid job to support her mother, who has dementia.

When new boy Bailey (Kasey MacKellar) arrives, May-Li prevents him from running away. His social worker Serjay (Danny Ashok) tries to pass the responsibility of telling Bailey that he will be remaining at the 'Dumping Ground' to Mike and May-Li, but May-Li insists he is to do so. May-Li and Mike (Connor Byrne) prevent Bailey from leaving with his father, Jimmy (Mark Theodore), as they are now legally responsible for him. May-Li lectures the young people when they go to find Frank (Christopher Slater). May-Li accompanies Tyler (Miles Butler-Hughton) during a day out with his mother, Sally (Diveen Henry), but Sally, who has not taken her medication for bipolar disorder, runs off with Tyler. When the young people are divided on what to watch on TV, May-Li sides with those who want to watch football, but they all fall asleep after a competition. Frank ruins Faith's (Leanne Dunstan) and Rick's (Daniel Pearson) clothes by putting a red top in the wash, turning the other clothes pink. May-Li suggests they have a cake-baking competition in which the losing team has to wear a pink dress. She comforts Mo (Reece Buttery) after he writes a competition entry for Bailey, who has difficulty reading. Floss (Sarah Rayson) takes a liking to Carmen's nail stuff, so May-Li talks to Floss about having been left in a nail salon as a baby, suggesting that Carmen's nail varnish may trigger memories. May-Li learns that Johnny (Joe Maw) is considering joining the army and Mike disagrees with May-Li, who encourages Johnny and views his plans positively. May-Li supervises Floss when potential adoptive parents, Doug (Michael Hodgson) and Nerys (Lucy Speed) meet her at the 'Dumping Ground'. May-Li accompanies and observes Floss, Doug and Nerys at the park and when Floss runs away after pushing a boy, Jesse (Alex Humprey), May-Li finds her. May-Li allows Tee (Mia McKenna-Bruce) to go with Floss to Doug and Nerys' house, but after the visit, Floss shows Tee and May-Li her scrapbook full of celebrity images as Floss tries to imagine her mother. May-Li tells Floss she can live at the 'Dumping Ground'.

Bailey takes on responsibility of a dog, Mischief (Sage), after he blames himself for the death of his homeless owner Mal (Dai Bradley) and he wins Mike and May-Li round upon training him. When Harry Jones leaves the 'Dumping Ground' for a foster family, Floss cuts off Jeff the giraffe's head and May-Li later returns Jeff to him. Mike and May-Li lecture Tee and Kazima when they leave a holiday club and what they should have done after catching two burglars. Ryan (Lewis Hamilton) accesses everyone's records and he receives a text from Harry, asking for help and he tells Mike and May-Li about Harry's foster placement. Ryan takes Harry and his foster brother, Finn (Ruben Reuter), from their foster home and when they arrive at the 'Dumping Ground', Harry does not want to return. Harry and Finn tell May-Li what their foster home was like. A rabbit is found in the garden and Toni (Nelly Currant) calls it Mr Nibbles. Billie (Gwen Currant) and Finn show May-Li a picture of Toni with her father and a rabbit, Mr Nibbles, resembling the one they found. Toni and Billie tell May-Li that their father let Mr Nibbles out of the hutch and they had foxes. May-Li receives a call from the rabbit owner and she breaks the news to Toni. Toni decides not to accept May-Li's offer of a rabbit when the rabbit has baby rabbits.

New girl Sasha (Annabelle Davis) arrives at the 'Dumping Ground' before being moved to secure accommodation. She smashes the minibus lights to prevent the young people seeing Lily (Jessie Williams), but chooses to apologise. Whilst out shopping with May-Li, Sasha sees her brother, Dexter (Alexander Aze), shoplifting and deliberately knocks over a display. Kazima tells May-Li. May-Li collects Jody Jackson (Kia Pegg) from a shop after Jody takes the blame for shoplifting. Bailey is promised football tickets by his reviewing officer, Abi (Kemi-Bo Jacobs), Bailey gets Faith to help him alter his record, but May-Li catches him. When Abi is impressed with Bailey, May-Li prevents Bailey receiving the tickets, informing her of what Bailey did. May-Li receives some expensive cheese from her mother, but she later finds it stolen. Carmen and Kazima question everyone and the culprit is revealed to be Mischief. May-Li lends Carmen an antique necklace, but Carmen drops it down the toilet accidentally and when Carmen thinks about either leaving it or attempting to get it out, she decides to tell May-Li. May-Li allows Sasha to go out to a skate night if she makes dinner, but she leaves Toni (Nelly Currant) and Billie (Gwen Currant), to put a lasagne in the oven, but the dinner burns after Ryan interferes with the oven settings. May-Li bans Sasha from the skate night, but Tee and Sasha decide to go as May-Li will not be at work and Toni and Billie agree to cover them. May-Li ends up having to work, so Billie and Toni lock her in the bathroom. Tee owns up to going to the skate park, after Billie and Toni are grounded; May-Li already knows that Sasha went. Tee makes amends with the young people and convinces May-Li and Mike to let Sasha stay. May-Li's grandmother, PoPo (Pik-Sen Lim), visits, but May-Li does not want to take over her shop. May-Li allows PoPo to teach the young people kung fu and when Jody tells May-Li that she and PoPo should make up, May-Li explains how PoPo does not accept her family as her partner is a woman. When May-Li discusses taking over the business, PoPo hurts May-Li when she will not allow May-Li's adopted children to inherit it, insisting that they are not her family and May-Li did not give birth to them. After a kung fu contest, May-Li gives PoPo the chance to meet her children. Later, May-Li receives a family heirloom from PoPo, her great-great-grandfather's diary. Jasna (Dolya Gavanski) gives Kazima the results of the age assessment intended to establish whether she is a minor. It gives her birth year as 1997, making her 18 and facing deportation. May-Li comforts Kazima, reassuring her they are going to appeal the decision and Carmen arranges for Kazima's appeal to be filmed. Kazima is allowed to stay when she is reunited with her father, Hakim Tako (Richard Pepple).

The 'Dumping Ground' is inspected by OFSTED inspectors, Rowena (Alison Hammond) and Lizzie (Kate Copeland), who are impressed by a play put on by the young people. Sasha returns after learning that her mother is pregnant, so she tells May-Li she wants to be fostered and May-Li and Mike tell her she has been matched to potential adoptive parents. Floss decides she wants to leave the 'Dumping Ground' when she bullies Finn and May-Li figures out she misses Harry, so gets Floss to apologise to Finn. Kazima confesses to breaking into the office when the young people are threatened with being grounded, telling May-Li and Mike she wants to be adopted to stay in the UK and took files of those who were adopted. May-Li and Mike explain the difficulty of finding adoptive parents for someone her age, explaining that adoption at her age usually involves someone who already knows the child. The young people figure out Kazima is taking an interest in things May-Li likes, realising she wants May-Li to adopt her and the young people overhear May-Li telling Mike she will think about it, but Kazima changes her mind and is told later she can stay. On Tee and Carmen's last day, they are told they will not be housed together due to a change in council policy and Tee declines May-Li's offer to tell Carmen. When May-Li comments on how Tee and Carmen are with each other, their social worker manages to house them together.

May-Li, Mike and the young people are invited to meet their new neighbours, Peter and Janet Umbleby (Simon Ludders and Alison Pargeter), who mistake the young people for Mike and May-Li's children and when they discover they are from a care home, they decide to hold a public meeting. May-Li and Mike are worried that they may receive another Ofsted visit and Ryan (Lewis Hamilton) believes he is going to be sent away after overhearing a conversation. However, Joseph (Yousef Naseer) chooses to volunteer to leave, but it turns out it was for a theme park trip as a representative of the home. May-Li and Mike are not happy when Chloe (Hannah Moncur) disappears with a girl, Candi Rose (Carma Hylton), while out with Ryan. May-Li also realises that Kazima likes the Umblebys' son, Edward Umbleby (Jaimie Boubezari) after noticing her dislike of Peter's treatment of Edward. Chloe is shocked when Candi-Rose arrives at the 'Dumping Ground' with May-Li, as is Candi-Rose when she sees Chloe, Both girls had lied about their lives. Candi-Rose says that she intended to tell Chloe the truth, while Chloe tearfully tells May-Li that she wanted a friend who would like her for herself. May-Li helps Archie (Jethro Baliba) when he injures himself and Archie offers to help May-Li do a border in the garden, coming up with plans, and Archie denies Ryan's suggestion that he sees May-Li as a mother figure. May-Li and Mike realise Archie's feelings when Ryan is accused of trashing the border, but May-Li reassures him he is special. Floss is picked to appear in a commercial and May-Li helps her when Floss struggles with how to act with a TV mother without having her own and she tells May-Li and Mike she wants to be adopted. When Archie is convinced he is getting younger, May-Li and Mike give him a parcel of things from his father. When May-Li returns from holiday, a boy and an older man, Alex (Connor Lawson) and George (Paul Barber), are hiding in the attic with Kazima and Tyler's help. May-Li discovers them when Alex confronts Kazima about George's disappearance. George leaves to encourage Alex to stay at the home, upsetting the young people. After receiving a video call from her father in Denmark, Kazima chooses to join him and May-Li takes Kazima to the airport.

In series 5, episode 20, Mike and May-Li argue after he writes critical comments on her assessment form. The young people arrange a meal to help them reconcile, but the argument continues and May-Li says she will leave.

After Finn and Joseph discover that she has been eating coal, May-Li tells Mike and the young people that she is pregnant and due before Christmas. She later gives birth to a son, Henry, named after Charlie's grandfather.

In series 10, May-Li is offered a better-paid job closer to home, which would allow her to spend more time with Alice and their children. She argues with Alice and turns down the job because she does not want to leave everyone at Ashdene Ridge but she seems to regret her decision. With support from the children, May-Li decides to take the new job.

On her last day at the Dumping Ground, she learns that Candi-Rose's real name has been exposed and that her parents have tracked her down. Because of this, Candi-Rose has to leave Ashdene Ridge that day to be moved to a new care home with a new name. May-Li reassures Candi-Rose that she will be fine and watches Candi-Rose leave for her new care home before she leaves to go on holiday with Alice before she starts her new job.

=== Bailey Wharton ===
Bailey Wharton
- Tracy Beaker character
- Portrayed by: Kasey MacKellar
- Duration: 2014–2018
- First appearance: Booting Up; 10 January 2014
- Last appearance: "Missing Presumed Single"; 7 December 2018
- Introduced by: Lis Steele
In-universe information
- Occupation: Student
- Father: Jimmy Wharton
- Mother: Alison Wharton
- Half-sisters: Tia

Bailey Wharton, portrayed by Kasey MacKellar, made his first appearance on 10 January 2014 in series 2 of The Dumping Ground during the episode "Booting Up - Part 1". He departed in series 5 during the episode "Back In The Game - Part 2".

He is shown to be quite aggressive and cocky, with a very short temper, and likes to wind people up, especially Johnny and Mike. He is a skilled footballer and is often criticised by the others for thinking he is better than he is and making unnecessary comments. It is later revealed he is dyslexic. Bailey later befriends Mo Michaels and Jody Jackson, but does not always see eye to eye with Jody during the progression of series 2. During series 3 and 4, Bailey becomes more reserved, spending much of his time with Mischief or playing football. He also becomes calmer and shows his sensitive side when he comforts Mo and meets a woman claiming to be his mother in series 4.

In the fourth episode of series 3, Bailey argues with a homeless man, Mal, while trying to retrieve his football. Mal falls over, and Bailey believes that he pushed him. The next day, Bailey finds a memorial where Mal used to sit with his dog, Mischief, and fears that he caused Mal's death. Feeling guilty, he takes in Mischief without Mike Milligan or May-Li Wang's permission. They eventually allow him to keep the dog. Ryan Reeves, who is afraid of dogs but embarrassed to admit it, cuts Mischief's collar and lets him out of the garden to make it look as though he has run away. Bailey and Tee post his picture on a missing-dog website. When Bailey finds Mischief nearby, the dog runs across the road towards him and is hit by a car. At the vet's, Mike warns Bailey that Mischief might not survive. Bailey confesses that he believes he killed Mal, so Mike takes him to the police station to make a statement. They learn that Bailey was not responsible for Mal's death. Meanwhile, the other residents sell Kazima's soup to raise money for Mischief's operation. They raise enough, and Mischief returns home with Bailey as his new owner.

On his last episode he and Sasha saved Dexter from getting into more trouble that Roddy dragged him into (it is revealed Roddy is a thief). Bailey makes his final appearance in the second episode of series 5, when he accepts a position as a junior football coach in the United States and moves there with Mischief.

=== Kazima Tako ===
Kazima Tako
- Tracy Beaker character
- Portrayed by: Akuc Bol
- Duration: 2014–2017, 2023
- First appearance: "Finding Frank"; 31 January 2014
- Last appearance: "Life Is What You Bake It"; 9 June 2023
- Introduced by: Lis Steele
In-universe information
- Father: Hakim Tako
- Brothers: Amir Tako

Kazima Tako also Durrani, portrayed by Akuc Bol, made her first appearance on 31 January 2014 in series 2 of The Dumping Ground, during the episode "Finding Frank". She departed in series 5, during the episode "Farvel".

Frank has not been seen or heard from for a while, so Carmen (Amy-Leigh Hickman), Rick (Daniel Pearson), Bailey (Kasey MacKellar) and Tee (Mia McKenna-Bruce) try to track him down. They notice Kazima buying Frank's pocket watch, claiming it was her mother's and they find Frank and Kazima at a burger van. It emerges that Kazima and Frank are sleeping rough. Frank and Mike (Connor Byrne) later talk and Frank decides to move back in. Frank later informs Kazima that Mike is sorting things for her through children's services. Carmen reluctantly agrees to share her room with Kazima; however, Carmen is annoyed by Kazima's behaviour and orders Kazima to leave. Kazima sleeps on Frank's bedroom floor and when Mike and May-Li (Stacy Liu) discover this, they tell Kazima boys and girls cannot share rooms for safeguarding reasons. Kazima plans to sleep in the garage, but Carmen learns of it and makes up with her.

Tee works on an Art project, but Kazima criticises it and she introduces Tee to her friend, street artist Roscoe (Simeon Zack). When there is a trip to a theme park and not enough tickets, Kazima does not mind staying behind. Tee decides to remain behind to allow Toni (Nelly Currant) and Billie (Gwen Currant) to go together. Kazima and Tee are forced to attend a fun day, but they leave early and go home. Unknown to them, money was planted in Kazima's bag by Maz (Natifa Mai) and Max (Frankie Wilson). Maz and Max break into The Dumping Ground and when Kazima checks her bag, she and Tee decide to refuse to hand it back due to the large amount. Kazima and Tee attempt to scare Maz and Max out of The Dumping Ground. They end up locking Max in the attic and trick Maz into the kitchen before tying her up. Maz and Max are arrested and the other residents arrive home after Mike learns that Kazima and Tee have left the fun day. Mike and May-Li lecture Kazima and Tee on the situation and all the children are sent to the fun day. When Tyler (Miles Butler-Hughton) learns to play a trombone, Kazima helps him and she reveals her father and brother were kidnapped for making music.

New girl, Sasha (Annabelle Davis), arrives at The Dumping Ground. After going home to collect her bedroom key, Sasha goes shopping with May-Li and Kazima. Kazima witnesses Sasha knocking down a display so she can speak to her brother, Dexter (Alexander Aze). When May-Li receives some expensive cheese from her mother, she later finds it stolen. Kazima and Carmen question everyone and they later reveal Mischief (Sage) as the culprit. Carmen drops May-Li's antique necklace down the toilet and Carmen thinks about what would happen if she left the necklace or if she tried to get it back. When Carmen thinks about getting it back, she enlists Kazima's help to retrieve it and they arrange for a plumber to fix the toilet.

As part of her application to stay in the UK, Kazima must prove she is a minor and undergo an age assessment. After learning of Kazima's situation, Carmen tries to get Kazima to open up about what happened. Kazima explains how her father was captured by the army and her mother died at a Kenyan refugee camp before she fled to England. Kazima gets the results for her age assessment and is informed by Jasna (Dolye Gavanski) that they believe she was born in 1997 and is 18 years old. Kazima decides to run away and she goes to Frank's, but she runs away when Mike and Carmen go visit. Later, Kazima is reunited with her father, Hakim (Richard Pepple) and Kazima's age can be proved by documents. Kazima and Hakim learn that Kazima's brother may be alive in Somalia and Hakim decides to go to Somalia, leaving Kazima at The Dumping Ground.

Kazima left The Dumping Ground halfway through the fifth series, in episode 12, as she moved to Denmark with her father and brother. Kazima featured in 55 episodes of the series.

=== Ryan Reeves ===
Ryan Reeves
- Tracy Beaker character
- Portrayed by: Lewis Hamilton
- Duration: 2015–2019
- First appearance: Law and Disorder; 16 January 2015
- Last appearance: "There's a Million Ways to Say Goodbye"; 15 March 2019
- Introduced by: Lis Steele
In-universe information
- Occupation: Hostler
- Mother: Sarah Reeves
- Brothers: Owen (foster)
- Sisters: Chloe Reeves

Ryan Reeves, portrayed by Lewis G. Hamilton, made his first appearance on 16 January 2015 in series 3 of The Dumping Ground during the episode "Law & Disorder: Part 2". He was sixteen in the seventh series.

He is a skilled liar who joins Ashdene Ridge in the wake of a disastrous foster party where wallets and purses were reported stolen and he becomes embroiled in the events, eventually working out the identity of the thief and blackmailing them to keep it a secret. He is aged thirteen with a Liverpudlian accent and short brown hair and quickly proves himself to be mischievous, deceitful and intelligent. He also becomes friends with Johnny Taylor when Ryan manages to keep Johnny's army dream alive by finding the thief of wallets and purses to clear Johnny's name. In "Mischief" it is revealed that he has cynophobia (fear of dogs). In "Who Are You?" it is discovered that he has a sister from whom he was separated. During his first episode, Ryan deleted an email sent to Mike concerning both mental health and himself, before destroying the computer keyboard.

Ryan and Tee Taylor often have issues, and they always fall out and accuse each other of things, which often becomes quite serious in certain situations. In series 6, Ryan is hailed as a hero after a burglar runs into him while escaping through the garden. Later, at Mike's stag party, Ryan is embarrassed to discover that the other boys have brought presents for Mike, as he did not know about the arrangement. When he trips over a fossil given by Bird and Jay, the boys laugh at him. Ryan loses his temper and smashes the wedding cake. He later phones Mike to make amends, but tells him that he will never change and hangs up. Mike finds Ryan, who refuses to return home. Tracy arrives and persuades him to come back, and Ryan apologises to Mike and the other residents.

In Series 7 Ryan encounters his mother whilst he is in town with Mike. She later comes to the Dumping Ground, where he becomes angry that she has turned up. Later on, Ryan takes her to their old house and tells her that he is not the bad person that she thinks he is. After his mother leaves, Ryan decides to leave the Dumping Ground and writes a letter to his friends explaining that they should look after Chloe, and that he is sorry for everything he ever did.

=== Toni Trent ===
Toni Trent
- Tracy Beaker character
- Portrayed by: Nelly Currant
- Duration: 2015–2018, 2023
- First appearance: "Stuck with You"; 23 January 2015
- Last appearance: "Life Is What You Bake It"; 9 June 2023
- Introduced by: Lis Steele
In-universe information
- Occupation: Student
- Adoptive father: Dom Harper
- Adoptive mother: Sally Harper
- Sisters: Billie Trent

Toni Trent, portrayed by Nelly Currant, made her first appearance on 23 January 2015 in series 3 of The Dumping Ground during the episode Stuck With You.

In "Fake it to Make It", Toni and Billie try to convince everyone that they are telepathic. However, the plan backfires when Bailey, Mo and Tyler start avoiding the twins because of it.

In "Breaking in" Toni is upset as there are not enough tickets for her to go to the theme park with Billie and the other Dumping Ground children. However, she is allowed to go after all as Tee gives Toni her ticket.

In "Dragon Slayer", Toni finds a rabbit in the garden, and believes it is the reincarnation of a rabbit she had owned which had been killed by foxes after her father left open its hutch to punish her. She is upset when she learns that it has an owner. Eventually, May-Li manages to convince Toni that the rabbit was not hers as it was female.

In "Better Than You", Toni falls out with Billie, who does not like her bossing her about, leading to Floss and Toni stealing Billie's idea of giving tours around Ashdene Ridge.

In "The Switch", Toni and her twin sister Billie are adopted by a couple called Dom and Sally Harper.

It was revealed on 7 September 2018 that Nelly would reprise her role as Toni Trent, along with some other old residents, as she can be seen walking up to the Dumping Ground in the new trailer.

=== Billie Trent ===
Billie Trent
- Tracy Beaker character
- Portrayed by: Gwen Currant
- Duration: 2015–2018, 2023
- First appearance: "Stuck with You"; 23 January 2015
- Last appearance: "Life Is What You Bake It"; 9 June 2023
- Introduced by: Lis Steele
In-universe information
- Occupation: Student
- Adoptive father: Dom Harper
- Adoptive mother: Sally Harper
- Sisters: Toni Trent

Billie Trent, portrayed by Gwen Currant, made her first appearance on 23 January 2015 in series 3 of The Dumping Ground during the episode Stuck With You.

In "Fake it to Make It", Billie and Toni tried to convince everyone that they were telepathic. However, the plan backfired when Bailey, Mo and Tyler started avoiding the twins because of it.

In "Dragon Slayer", Billie was worried about her sister, Toni, who got upset about a rabbit she found in the garden. Eventually Billie told May-Li that Toni had owned a rabbit when they lived with their parents.

In "Free to Good Home", Floss and Toni try to get Billie to pretend to be a gymnast in order to win a trampoline. However, Billie is unwilling and runs away.

In "Better Than You", Billie starts giving other children tours round the Dumping Ground, getting them to pay. However, when she falls out with Toni, Floss steals her idea, and she and Toni decide to give tours of their own. Billie teams up with Tyler and they plan their own rival tour; however, Faith tells them they should not treat the Dumping Ground like a freak show, and persuades Billie and Tyler to stop giving tours. Billie eventually makes up with Toni.

In "The Switch", Billie and her twin sister Toni are adopted by a couple called Dom and Sally Harper.

It was revealed on 7 September 2018 that Gwen would reprise her role as Billie Trent, alongside other former residents shown approaching the Dumping Ground in a trailer.

=== Mischief ===
Mischief
- Tracy Beaker character
- Portrayed by: Sage
- Duration: 2015–2017
- First appearance: "Mischief"; 30 January 2015
- Last appearance: "Back in the Game"; 20 January 2017
- Introduced by: Lis Steele
- Species: Border Collie
In-universe information
- Owners: Bailey Wharton; Mal

Mischief, portrayed by ten-year-old Border Collie Sage, made his first appearance on 30 January 2015 in series 3 of The Dumping Ground during the episode "Mischief". He departed in series 5 during the episode "Back In The Game".

Mischief is owned originally by a homeless man who Bailey bumps into; when the man later dies in hospital after an incident with Bailey, Bailey feels guilty and becomes Mischief's new owner. However, when Mischief returns to Ashdene Ridge, his unruly behaviour means that Bailey must train him to prevent him from being put down. Bailey succeeds, and Mischief becomes the new Ashdene Ridge pet. Mischief left the show when Bailey did in series 5 as both went to America.

=== Finn McLaine ===
Finn McLaine
- Tracy Beaker character
- Portrayed by: Ruben Reuter
- Duration: 2015–2021, 2023-2024
- First appearance: "The Long Way Home"; 6 March 2015
- Last appearance: "Mum's The Word"; 1 March 2024
- Introduced by: Lis Steele
In-universe information
- Occupation: Porter
- Father: Paul (step-father)
- Mother: Melanie
- Adoptive father: Adam Aycliffe (foster)
- Adoptive mother: Nina Aycliffe (foster)
- Brothers: Louis (half brother); Harry Jones (foster)
- Sisters: Claire Aycliffe (foster)

Finn McLaine, portrayed by Ruben Reuter, made his first appearance on 6 March 2015 in series 3 of The Dumping Ground during the episode "Long Way Home".

Finn is initially fostered by the same family as Harry. When problems arise and Harry sends for help, they leave the foster home and join the Dumping Ground. Finn quickly befriends Harry and Ryan, and later becomes friends with Floss, Toni, Billie and Joseph. He grows closer to Alex in the second half of series 5. In "Rough Justice" (series 5, episode 19), Finn steals money to replace a statue he broke that belonged to Alex. In series 6, Charlie explains that Finn's father put him into care on the day he was born. Finn has Down syndrome.

In series 7, Finn meets his girlfriend, Ivy (Bethany Asher). It is assumed that they are still together as of series 10.

At the end of series 8, Finn gets a job at the local hospital as a porter.

Finn appears in only three episodes of series 9 because Reuter was shielding during most of the filming. He has small or background roles in "Moment of Truth", "The Remote" and "Festival Fibber".

In between series 9 and 10, Finn moved out of Ashdene Ridge to live with Alex. He returns in "Intergalactic", where he tends to Jay in the hospital after Jay has an injury. Later on, he sneaks over to Ashdene Ridge in the night for a visit where he reveals the truth about his current living situation. He tells Floss, Taz, Jay and Sid that Alex got a job in Manchester. Alex invited Finn to join him, but he did not want to leave his job at the hospital. However, Finn has struggled to live alone since Alex left. Although he originally was going to be sent to another care home, Jay decides to move out and lets Finn take his room.

In episode 17 of series 10, Finn meets his mother, Melanie, who abandoned him as a baby one day after giving birth to him. It was revealed that Melanie did not think she would be able to cope looking after a baby with Down syndrome, and thought Finn would be best with someone else to look after him. She has regretted that decision ever since. A couple of years later, Melanie married a man named Paul, and they had a son together, called Louis. Louis is 12 years old, and he does not have Down syndrome.

In episode 6 of series 11, Finn visits Porter's Lodge for one last goodbye and to leave "The Dumping Ground" mark there. He has fun helping Frankie, Oscar, and Shanice pull some pranks and complete some tasks like stealing Chelsey's phone and setting off a stink bomb to get Erin's cookies and also passes the Peter Pan book down to Erin before he leaves the care home for good.

=== Sasha Bellman ===
Sasha Bellman
- Tracy Beaker character
- Portrayed by: Annabelle Davis
- Duration: 2015–2022
- First appearance: "Three Days"; 6 October 2015
- Last appearance: "The Beat Goes On"; 18 February 2022
- Introduced by: Lis Steele
In-universe information
- Occupation: Student
- Mother: Kelly Bellman
- Stepfather: Kev
- Brothers: Dexter Bellman; Murphy Bellman; Roddy (step)
- Sisters: sister (name unknown)

Sasha Bellman, portrayed by Annabelle Davis, made her first appearance on 6 October 2015 in series 3 of The Dumping Ground during the episode "Three Days" and departed on 18 February 2022 in series 9.

Sasha initially causes chaos but gradually settles into Ashdene Ridge. She gets on well with most of the residents, except Ryan, and befriends Carmen and Tee.

Sasha is delighted when Kelly announces she is pregnant with Sasha's half-sister, but is left upset when Kelly says it would not work with Sasha being at home. Sasha decides she wants to be fostered and is matched with an adoptive couple, Lou (Warwick Davis) and Ange (Francesca Papagno), but on a trip to the seaside, Sasha realises she is not ready to give up her family and she plants goods from a shop in Ange's bag. Sasha convinces Harry to get to know Lou and Ange. Sasha has dwarfism, most likely due to spondyloepiphyseal dysplasia congenita.

In series 6, Sasha considers leaving Ashdene Ridge to join Dexter and her family in their new home, but ultimately decides to stay in "SorryNotSorry".

Sasha develops an interest in art from series 5 onwards and takes up knitting in series 7.

In series 7, Sasha's former best friend, Freya, arrives at Ashdene Ridge and tries to make her life difficult.

In series 9, Sasha meets Drew, the lead singer of her favourite band, Death Night Thrashers, and tries to stop the band from breaking up. Her efforts lead to an offer to become Drew's assistant. Although initially conflicted, she accepts the opportunity with encouragement from Jody and Murphy and leaves the Dumping Ground.

=== Dexter Bellman ===
Dexter Bellman
- Tracy Beaker character
- Portrayed by: Alexander Aze
- Duration: 2015–2018
- First appearance: "Three Days"; 6 October 2015
- Last appearance: "SorryNotSorry"; 9 February 2018
- Introduced by: Lis Steele
In-universe information
- Occupation: Student
- Mother: Kelly Bellman
- Stepfather: Kev
- Brothers: Murphy Bellman; Roddy (step)
- Sisters: Sasha Bellman; Unknown (maternal)

Dexter Bellman, portrayed by Alexander Aze, made his first appearance on 6 October 2015 in series 3 of The Dumping Ground during the episode "Three Days".

series 3
Dexter turns up at the 'Dumping Ground' looking for his sister, however his sister, Sasha (Annabelle Davis) tells him he has to go and she gets him out of the 'Dumping Ground'. Sasha realises Dexter took her room key, so she goes home for it and discovers that Dexter needs her help to get nappies. Sasha ends up going shopping with May-Li (Stacy Liu) and she catches Dexter shoplifting nappies and Dexter tells her he could not find any money. After catching Dexter trying to shoplift, Sasha returns home and finds Murphy (Thomas and Oliver Waldram) alone. Dexter turns up unexpectedly, asking for Sasha. Dexter later throws rubbish over the health and safety inspector's (Shameem Ahmed) car in order to be taken into care, but his family are given the support of social services.

series 4
After Sasha is teased by Ryan (Lewis Hamilton) after he discovers her vlog, Sasha goes home and goes to the park with Dexter and his friend, but Sasha believes their mother is rubbish at looking after him. At home after speaking to their mother, Sasha realises Dexter is fine.

series 5
When Sasha discovers that their stepbrother, Roddy (Alfie Browne-Sykes), is involving Dexter in burglaries, she finds Dexter in a building containing stolen goods and discovers that Kelly is involved. Dexter is placed under a voluntary care order. In the episode "Sasha Bellman P.I", a package that was sent to Archie was stolen by Dexter out of curiosity, as he rarely receives packages from home, and Sasha has to cover up for him, resulting in the package being found in Jody's room, Tyler being blamed but then proven innocent and the whole house having extra chores - Only Sasha, Jody and Dexter know who stole it. Dexter promises Sasha that he will never steal other people's belongings again.

Dexter leaves off-screen between series 5 and 6, moving back in with his mother, stepfather, brother and baby sister. He makes two guest appearances in series 6, confirming that he has returned to his mother. Sasha plans to join him in "SorryNotSorry" but decides to remain at the Dumping Ground.

=== Murphy Bellman ===
Murphy Bellman
- Tracy Beaker character
- Portrayed by: Thomas and Oliver Waldram (2015); Fred Montgomery Scott (2016); Lenny Rush (2021–2022)
- Duration: 2015–2016, 2021–2022
- First appearance: "Free to Good Home"; 13 October 2015
- Last appearance: "Breaking Chains"; 25 March 2022
- Introduced by: Lis Steele
In-universe information
- Occupation: Student
- Mother: Kelly Bellman
- Stepfather: Kev
- Brothers: Dexter Bellman; Roddy (step)
- Sisters: Sasha Bellman; Unknown (maternal)

Murphy Bellman made his first appearance in the series 3 episode "Free to Good Home" broadcast on 13 October 2015. Introduced as the infant brother of Sasha (Annabelle Davis) and Dexter Bellman (Alexander Aze), he was played by Thomas and Oliver Waldram in series 3 and Fred Montgomery Scott in series 4. He was reintroduced as part of the main cast in the series 9 episode "Run, Rescue, Repeat" broadcast on 13 August 2021, now played by Lenny Rush.

Sasha visits her old home and finds Dexter and Murphy by themselves while their mother sleeps. She later finds Dexter shoplifting for nappies and realises that Murphy has been left home alone. Social services arrange support for their mother to help her take care of her sons.

Some years later, in series 9, Sasha finds Murphy trying to steal Scott Jenson's (Louis Payne) phone and discovers that he has been left on his own again whilst their mother is on holiday in Spain. Arrangements are made to put Murphy in temporary care at Ashdene Ridge, but he refuses to settle in and has several tantrums, smashing the TV and destroying Sasha's college art project in the process. Enraged, Sasha goes to their home to get away from him and learns that their mother has been neglecting Murphy again, which has caused problems at school. Returning to the DG, Sasha manages to calm Murphy down and starts helping him learn how to settle in.

Murphy does not return in series 10.

=== Chloe Reeves ===
Chloe Reeves
- Tracy Beaker character
- Portrayed by: Hannah Moncur
- Duration: 2016–2021
- First appearance: "Hold the Front Page"; 20 February 2016
- Last appearance: "Memory Lane"; 6 August 2021
- Introduced by: Lucy Martin
In-universe information
- Occupation: Student
- Mother: Sarah Reeves
- Brothers: Ryan Reeves
- Sisters: Iona (foster)

Chloe Reeves, portrayed by Hannah Moncur, made her first appearance on 19 February 2016 in series 4 of The Dumping Ground during the episode "Hold the Front Page". Chloe's brother is Ryan, and they are constantly arguing and fighting. In "The Fairytail Princess", Chloe meets Candi-Rose, and wants to make a good impression on her. Both girls end up lying to make themselves sound better. Candi-Rose then moves in, much to Chloe and Ryan's surprise. Chloe's best friend is Candi-Rose. In later episodes, Chloe has been with Joseph, and has blackmailed her brother.

In series 9, Chloe has the chance to live with her Scottish friend Iona and her family. Although reluctant to leave Candi-Rose, she decides to be fostered and leaves the Dumping Ground.

=== Joseph Stubbs ===
Joseph Stubbs
- Tracy Beaker character
- Portrayed by: Yousef Naseer
- Duration: 2016–2018
- First appearance: "It Takes Two"; 28 October 2016
- Last appearance: "Missing Presumed Single"; 7 December 2018
- Introduced by: Lucy Martin
In-universe information
- Occupation: Student

Joseph Stubbs, portrayed by Yousef Naseer, made his first appearance on 28 November 2016 in series 4 of The Dumping Ground during the episode "It Takes Two". Joseph enjoys chores: when Mike tells Tyler to wash the floor, Joseph volunteers while sorting out the residents' shoes. He also loves space and breaks into an observatory with Finn so that he could see the moon more clearly. He correctly calculates that 40 divided by 3 is 13.3 recurring. He gets along with the older residents like Tyler, Jody, Kazima, Tee and Bailey. He is also best friends with Finn, Archie and Dexter. In "Rough Justice", Joseph challenges the others when they blame Alex for an outbreak of nits because of his temper. He is also close to Johnny, who makes a guest appearance in "Save the DG" and helps with efforts to save the home.

series 4 (TDG)
Joseph arrives after Sammy leaves. He initially has strained relationships with Mo, Ryan, Floss and Finn, but befriends Archie, Chloe, Tyler, Bailey and Jody. He apologises to Bailey Wharton for kidnapping Mischief and feels sorry for Tyler Lewis when Bailey mocks his dancing. Bailey later explains that he was joking rather than trying to insult Tyler.

series 5 (TDG)
In "One Giant Leap", Ryan mistakenly believes that Mike wants to make him leave the home. Assuming that Joseph has no friends, he tries to persuade the other residents to send Joseph away instead. It turns out that Mike is choosing someone to represent Ashdene Ridge at a fair, and he has selected Ryan. After learning of the misunderstanding, the residents want Joseph to go instead.

In "Wardrobe", Ryan resents being left at home with Joseph and Kazima. He had tried to manipulate a card game so that Tyler would pick Finn, but Joseph distracted Finn by asking about dinosaurs. While Joseph and Kazima move a newly delivered wardrobe, Joseph becomes locked inside it. They chase after the wardrobe but lose track of it. Joseph eventually escapes using Ryan's grandfather's medal. Kazima is delighted to find him, and Ryan later makes amends with him.

In "Rough Justice", Joseph and Jody are accused of stealing money despite having witnesses who can support their innocence. Floss gives false testimony against them. Joseph had raised the money to buy a lava lamp from the planetarium, with Jody's help. Floss tries to bribe Joseph into accusing Jody, but he refuses and exposes her lies. Finn is eventually revealed to have stolen the money to buy Alex a replacement ornament.

Joseph leaves after the sixth series.

=== Archie Able ===
Archie Able
- Tracy Beaker character
- Portrayed by: Jethro Baliba
- Duration: 2016–2018
- First appearance: "How to Be Perfect"; 18 November 2016
- Last appearance: "Two Sides to Every Story"; 2 March 2018
- Introduced by: Lucy Martin
In-universe information
- Occupation: Student

Archibald Jeremiah "Archie" Able, portrayed by Jethro Baliba, made his first appearance on 21 November 2016 in series 4 of The Dumping Ground during the episode "How to Be Perfect". Archie tends to get on well with everyone. He has been shown to be closest to Joseph, Bailey and Ryan.

series 4 (TDG)
Archie is introduced to the young people by May-Li Wang (Stacy Liu) in the episode "How To Be Perfect". When Kazima Tako (Akuc Bol) asks May-Li to adopt her (to help with her application to stay in the UK), Archie is one of the others to compete with Kazima to be adopted. Archie also told Kazima, after she asked about his father and brother, that he has no family at all. He said that he often moves around and called himself unique and collectable. He sees Bailey Wharton as a brotherly figure, and the two get along well. Archie's best friend is Joseph Stubbs. He has also been shown to be quite close with Dexter Bellman.

series 5 (TDG)
In "Sittin' In A Tree" Archie seems to see May-Li as a mother-like figure. Ryan notices this. Archie asks to go to the garden centre with May-Li. She agrees but ends up going with Toni. Upset, Archie trashes the garden. May-Li feels bad for going to the garden centre without Archie, as she did not realise how important it was to Archie. Archie later expresses his worries out loud to Ryan about getting too attached to care workers, and Ryan tells him "It's just a phase - and then you get over it." Ryan reassures Archie by telling him that he too became attached to a care worker in the past.

In "Sasha Bellman P.I." Toni and Billie Trent convince Archie that he is ageing backwards because he told them he remembers being in a wheelchair giving talks to students, as well as knowing an old song. Archie concludes that he has only eight years left before he disappears, so he makes a bucket list that includes swimming with dolphins, relearning to swim and seeing the Queen. May-Li explains that he remembers sitting in a pushchair while his father gave talks, and that he recognises the song because his father often played it. That very day, Dexter steals his package but Archie gets it back. It contains books from his father's university and Archie's emotional reaction suggests that Archie's father died.

series 6 (TDG)
In "Jody on the Ropes", Archie competes in the Hunger Games style battle to win a luxury attic bedroom, which later turns out not to be intended for Ashdene Ridge. Archie teams up with Charlie. Archie earned third place in the battle, as he was "taken down" by Alex and used as bait to try and take down Charlie.

In "Saved By the Bell", Jody argues with Sasha and pushes her out of her bedroom. When Archie opens the door, Jody mistakes him for Sasha and slams it, giving him a bloody nose. His nose is not broken. Jody does not intend to hurt him but is struggling to control her anger.

In "Give and Take", Archie becomes angry after losing a football game to Alex and Jody. May-Li suggests yoga and meditation to help him stay calm. He asks her to join him, but she is trying to finish a book and suggests that he meditate alone in the garden. Insects disturb him outside, so he joins May-Li in the quiet room. An argument between Charlie and Sasha interrupts him again, and he complains to May-Li. He eventually completes his meditation and feels more relaxed.

In "Heroes", Joseph asks to move into Archie's room. Mike agrees, provided that both Archie and Joseph's current roommate, Finn, are happy with the arrangement. Mike also gives Joseph a colourful coat from the lost-and-found box. The coat turns out to belong to Archie, who accuses Joseph of stealing and no longer wants to share with him. They snub each other and fight over the last sausage at lunch, knocking over plates and drinks before Taz takes it. Mike and May-Li pretend that one of them will have to move to Sleepy Hollow, a home on an island, unless they reconcile. Archie and Joseph ask the other residents to vote on who should stay, but nobody wants to choose between them. Finn, left with the deciding vote, insists that they stop arguing and share a room. They make up, and Joseph moves in.

In "SorryNotSorry", when Sasha is set to leave the 'Dumping Ground' and move back in with her mother and family, Dexter returns to say goodbye to everyone before leaving properly. As Dexter used to share a room with Archie, he grows jealous and feels left out when seeing Joseph sharing the room with Archie now.

In "Cat's in the Cradle", Archie buys a large quantity of discounted carrots, hoping to sell them at a profit. May-Li wants them out of the kitchen, but Archie cannot find buyers. Joseph suggests making carrot ice cream, which they abandon after tasting it. Feeling sorry for Archie, May-Li gives him £1 and makes him promise to spend it only when necessary. She later discovers parsnips hidden under his bed sheets, showing that he has repeated the mistake.

In "Challenging Times", Ashdene Ridge competes against Graybridge, another care home, to win a trip to London. One quiz task is to remember objects shown in a video starring Joseph and Archie in a spoof of Doctor Who. Archie plays a Cyberman, while Joseph plays the Doctor, dressed as Matt Smith's incarnation.

In "Utopia", May-Li mentions that Archie is away meeting some potential foster parents, and he does not return to the show after this.

=== Candi-Rose ===
Candi-Rose
- Tracy Beaker character
- Portrayed by: Carma Hylton
- Duration: 2017–2022
- First appearance: "The Fairytale Princess"; 3 February 2017
- Last appearance: "The Hardest Word"; 2 December 2022
- Introduced by: Jonathan Phillips
In-universe information
- Other names: Courtney
- Occupation: Student
- Father: Adam
- Mother: Jasmine
- Sisters: Lauren

Candi-Rose (real name Courtney), portrayed by Carma Hylton, made her first appearance on 3 February 2017 in series 5 of The Dumping Ground during the episode "The Fairytale Princess". Like Carmen Howle in Tracy Beaker Returns, Candi-Rose likes pink and fashion and can be naive. When she arrives in the 'DG', she tells the other children that she is in care because her father works for the RAF and her mother is a make-up artist who works on films. However, her account is inconsistent: she later says that her mother works with singers and that her father is in the navy. Candi-Rose is introduced when she makes friends with Chloe. Later in series 6B, she also makes friends with Bird Wallis after he joined the cast in series 6A. Her friendship with Chloe resembles Carmen's friendship with Tee.

In "Sittin' in a Tree", Candi-Rose is shocked when she is told by the others that Jody and Tyler are just friends, because she and the other residents think they would make a good couple. Candi-Rose offers both Jody and Tyler advice about love, helping Tyler ask a girl for her number and Jody understand her feelings towards Tyler after she deliberately messes things up for Tyler and the girl he likes. Jody makes it clear that she and Tyler are just friends, but Candi-Rose is still convinced that Jody wants to be more than just friends with Tyler at some point in the future.

In "Faking It", Candi-Rose competes with Floss for a role in a TV advert and sabotages Floss by gluing Floss' shoes to the floor, stopping her clock and stealing a scrapbook of Floss' mother. She later feels guilty and confesses. Floss forgives her after telling Candi-Rose that she is rubbish at everything. Floss then persuades the director in charge of the advert to allow Candi-Rose to play a part in the advert as Floss' friend.

In "Making Waves", when a new resident (Taz) is due to arrive, Mike and May-Li thought it best for some of the residents to go out for the day so Taz would not be too overwhelmed on her first day. Sasha was originally having a trip to the beach just for her, but much to Sasha's annoyance, Mike invited half of the children along: Tyler, Ryan, Candi-Rose, Finn, Dexter, Joseph and Archie. When they arrive at the beach, Mike splits the children up into teams with various tasks. Mike teamed Candi-Rose with Sasha (again, much to Sasha's annoyance as the girls are the complete opposite in personality) to build a sand sculpture. Candi-Rose was much more enthusiastic than usual as she had never had a trip to the beach before. Candi-Rose and Sasha start getting along while they make an octopus sand sculpture. When they finish it Candi-Rose suggests for them to take a selfie in front of the sculpture. But when Tyler and Ryan arrive, Ryan starts to tease Sasha by saying she is starting to turn all pink and girly. Sasha does not take it well and starts to lash out at Candi-Rose and destroy their sand sculpture. This upsets Candi-Rose and causes her to run off crying. Sasha starts to feel bad and panics when she cannot find Candi-Rose. She asks Tyler and Ryan for help. Ryan refuses, but Tyler joins the search. Sasha and Tyler follow footprints leading to the sea, and end up finding her phone on the floor. They go to Mike to tell him that Sasha lost Candi-Rose, but before they tell Mike, Candi-Rose appears looking for her phone and much to everyone's shock, Sasha immediately hugs Candi-Rose after thinking she had lost her.

In "The Phantom of Ashdene Ridge", Candi-Rose and Chloe hide from what they think is a ghost. Candi-Rose mentions that she and her sister used to hide under their bed whenever they heard footsteps coming up the stairs. In "Candi-Rose?", she also reveals that her real name is Courtney and that she has an older sister named Lauren, from whom she is kept apart to avoid being found by their parents. Her favourite beauty blogger is Savannah B, and she wins a competition in series 8B which sees Savannah come to Ashdene Ridge and meet her.

In "The Real Candi-Rose", Candi-Rose's real name is overheard by Sabrina, who desperately tries to figure out who Courtney is and she ends up posting online asking about a Courtney at Ashdene Ridge. While the children are originally able to convince Sabrina that Courtney is a ghost, it is revealed in "The Hardest Word" that Candi-Rose's parents were able to track her down thanks to that post. Candi-Rose's mother claims to have changed, but this is a ruse to lure her away with her father. Jay helps Candi-Rose escape, and May-Li and Doreen help her evade her parents. Because her name and location have been exposed, Candi-Rose must move to another care home under a new identity. May-Li reassures her before she leaves.

=== Alex Walker ===
Alex Walker
- Tracy Beaker character
- Portrayed by: Connor Lawson
- Duration: 2017–2020, 2023
- First appearance: "Belief"; 3 March 2017
- Last appearance: "Life Is What You Bake It"; 9 June 2023
- Introduced by: Jonathan Phillips
In-universe information
- Occupation: Student; Café worker
- Mother: Aileen Peters
- Half-sisters: Alice Peters

Alex Walker, played by Connor Lawson, made his first appearance on 3 March 2017 in series 5 of The Dumping Ground during the episode "Belief".

Alex is quite a hot-tempered boy who has experienced a difficult childhood. Having lived on the streets from the age of twelve, Alex has learnt to take care of himself and finds it hard to listen to authority. He is shown to be gentle and sensitive at times, particularly to those he cares about. He respects Mike and he takes a particular liking to Floss soon becoming her best friend for a short time, in spite of his "tough" exterior. He prefers to be alone and can seem aloof, but is caring and has a strong sense of integrity. Although reluctant to be vulnerable, he eventually confides in Finn and Charlie.

Background
Before entering care, Alex lives with his mother, Aileen Peters, who struggles financially. When he is five, she takes him for a drive, buys him a comic and a bottle of fizzy drink, and leaves him outside his father's workplace. She believes that leaving him with his father is the right decision. Alex moves in with his father, who is frequently absent, and eventually enters care. He often runs away from care homes and is homeless by the age of twelve. After about two years on the streets, he befriends George, an older homeless man. George describes Alex as the grandson he never had, and they promise to look after each other.

series 5
In his first episode "Belief", Alex is still living homeless on the streets and frequently receives donations from Kazima Tako, who feels sorry for him since she once lived on the street and knows what it is like, but one day he runs off with her shopping bags and it is discovered he lives in a squat on his own. When Kazima convinces him to return to the 'DG' for some food, he steals the residents of the 'Dumping Ground's' belongings but they recover them at the end of the episode. He refuses help from Ashdene Ridge and Kazima and ultimately stays on his own.

In "Free", Alex returns to the 'DG' seeking help from Kazima because his friend George is ill and the council has boarded up their squat, leaving them with nowhere to go. Kazima manages to hide them both in the attic for a bit and gives them food until May-Li realises what is going on. Alex ends up staying at Ashdene Ridge after George tries to run away without Alex, and when Alex caught up with him, George shouted at him, telling him that he is trying to get away from him. He claims that their pact no longer suits him and that he does not want Alex around. He tells Alex to get lost but confesses to Kazima when Alex is returned to Ashdene Ridge by May-Li and Tyler, that he did not mean a word of what he just said, and just wanted to give Alex the best chance he had.

Alex was not a very popular person in the 'Dumping Ground', to begin with, as he is already known as a thief by the others and he has many angry outbursts, especially when Kazima announced she was leaving to live with her father in Denmark and Kazima was the only person in Ashdene Ridge that liked Alex, although Tyler had promised Kazima to look out for Alex. Although Alex does not become particularly close to Tyler, he eventually settles in and befriends Finn, Charlie and Jody. He also develops a strong rivalry with Ryan, although Ryan tried to stop Alex from egging the Mayor and Mr Umbelby.

series 6

In the episode "Cats in the Cradle", Alex and Charlie go round people's houses offering to do gardening. Alex sees a woman he recognises as his mother. He walks out of the job because of this, still angry at his mother's disappearance but he later meets his half-sister, Alice. Alex hears from Alice that his mother won a trophy and became rich. Alex is angry that his mother never returned for him but does not reveal himself to Alice or Aileen, not wanting to ruin their lives.

In episode 20, Alex uses his talent for cooking to be hired at Lily Kettle's cafe but working there does not go quite to plan as Ryan tries to sabotage it, making Alex rub avocado on Ryan's face. However, despite what had happened at the cafe, Lily visits the 'Dumping Ground' and tells Alex that he has got the job and Ryan finds himself being barred from the cafe.

series 7

In episode 3, Alex reveals himself to Aileen and Mike arranges for them to meet in a park. Alex becomes angry with his mother for leaving him homeless but eventually agrees to go on visits to see her.

In episode 16, shortly before Charlie leaves, Alex and Charlie realise that they have romantic feelings for each other. Charlie considers staying but ultimately decides to go.

In episode 23, he leaves the 'DG' to live with his mother and work at Lily's cafe.

He makes a guest appearance in series 8 episode "Risk", where he was spending his time with Finn, who wants to live with Alex as he said that Finn is always welcome.

=== Taz De Souza ===
Taz De Souza
- Tracy Beaker character
- Portrayed by: Jasmine Uson
- Duration: 2017–2023
- First appearance: "Making Waves"; 20 October 2017
- Last appearance: "Bright Sparks"; 23 June 2023
- Introduced by: Jonathan Phillips
In-universe information
- Occupation: Student
- Father: Jerome De Souza
- Mother: Mayumi De Souza

Tasmin "Taz" De Souza, played by Jasmine Uson, made her first appearance on 20 October 2017 in series 5 of The Dumping Ground during the episode "Making Waves". Her behaviour on arrival resembles Jody's when she first entered the home. In series 5, episode 20, Taz bursts into tears and clings to May-Li after hearing that she plans to leave following an argument with Mike. May-Li subsequently decides to stay. In "Cat's in the Cradle", Mike wants to sell the old piano, but Taz objects. She explains that her parents taught her to play it. Her father stopped playing after her mother died and placed Taz in care because he could not cope with raising her alone. Tyler, Jody and Floss support her efforts to keep the piano, and Mike changes his mind. Taz is of Filipino descent.

Gradually in the first half of series 7, she makes friends with Sid.

In series 7, episode 15, her father moves nearby and May-Li takes Taz to visit him. Taz hopes she can go on regular day visits to visit him but she overhears Mike and May-Li talk about whether they should actually let her. Taz then goes to lengths to impress Mike and May-Li so she can regularly go to see him.

In series 7, episode 23, Katy arrives at the 'DG'. Taz and Katy are made to share rooms which neither one is happy about. However, Taz and Katy eventually make friends in the first few episodes of series 8 after often arguing.

She does not return in series 11.

=== Charlie Morris ===
Charlie Morris
- Tracy Beaker character
- Portrayed by: Emily Burnett
- Duration: 2017–2019
- First appearance: "Mission Totally Possible"; 10 November 2017
- Last appearance: "Letting Go"; 18 October 2019
- Introduced by: Jonathan Phillips
In-universe information
- Other names: Lottie Morris
- Occupation: Student
- Mother: Melanie
- Grandfathers: Henry Lawrence

Charlotte "Charlie" Morris (also Lottie Morris), played by Emily Burnett, made her first appearance on 10 November 2017 in series 5 of The Dumping Ground during the episode "Mission Totally Possible".

Charlie arrives at the 'Dumping Ground' and gains permission to set up a den in the garden to watch wildlife, which Taz (Jasmine Uson) joins in with. Charlie and Jody (Kia Pegg) grow annoyed with Floss (Sarah Rayson) when she takes their spot cream and deodorant, but May-Li (Stacy Liu) reminds them that Floss is going through puberty, so Charlie and Jody make her a teenage survival kit. Charlie acts as judge in a kangaroo court when Jody and Joseph (Yousef Naseer) are suspected of stealing money. The young people are devastated when the 'Dumping Ground' is to be knocked down and Charlie works out what will happen to them, but the young people manage to prevent the 'Dumping Ground' being sold and celebrate Christmas.

In series 6, episode 3 "Give and Take", Charlie decides to sell some of her things and Sasha (Annabelle Davis) suggests they make T-shirts to sell, but becomes annoyed with Jody and Finn (Ruben Reuter) helping her. Charlie tells Sasha that she needs money to pay for yoga for her grandfather that helped him when he fell, but he is no longer getting classes as his home has stopped paying. Sasha offers to help her write a letter to the council to continue the funding.

In series 6, episode 16, "Home", Charlie's grandfather, Henry Lawrence, visits Ashdene Ridge. He tells her that his doctors do not expect him to live much longer. Charlie initially refuses to believe him and wants to leave the home to care for him, but Henry reassures her that he is being looked after and wants her to stay where she is.

In series 6, episode 23 "To Have and Not to Hold", Charlie's grandad passes away.

In series 7, episode 10 "A Mother's Love", Charlie goes with Mike to visit her mother, Melanie, in prison. She is later released from prison and moves into a hostel nearby. Around the same time, Charlie discovers Henry left his old house to her in his will.

In series 7, episode 16, "Letting Go", Charlie leaves Ashdene Ridge to travel around the world. Alex gives her a journal as a leaving present and thanks her for supporting him. When she leans towards him for a hug or a kiss on the cheek, he kisses her, then apologises and leaves. Sasha notices Alex leaving in a hurry and later asks Charlie what happened. Charlie admits that they kissed and that she may have feelings for him. She briefly postpones her trip to spend more time with Alex, but a visit to her grandfather's house reminds her how much she wants to travel. Alex encourages her to go, knowing that it is what both Charlie and her grandfather wanted, and promises to wait for her. They hug and say goodbye. Before leaving for the airport, Charlie sends Alex a video message for everyone at Ashdene Ridge. She asks Jody and Tyler to look after the other residents, encourages Bird's music and Jay's ambitions, and tells Floss to stay true to herself. She says she will miss Candi-Rose and Chloe's chats, encourages Taz's spirit and Sid's interest in the skies, and expresses confidence in Finn's future and Sasha's artwork. She tells May-Li that she will never forget helping to deliver her son, then thanks Mike and asks him to take care of Alex.

=== Bird Wallis ===
Bird Wallis
- Tracy Beaker character
- Portrayed by: Leo James
- Duration: 2018–2023
- First appearance: "Challenging Times"; 23 February 2018
- Last appearance: "Life Is What You Bake It"; 9 June 2023
- Introduced by: Jonathan Phillips
In-universe information
- Occupation: Student
- Father: Nana
- Half-brothers: Jay Wallis

Noah "Bird" Wallis, played by Leo James, made his first appearance on 23 February 2018 in series 6 of The Dumping Ground during the episode "Challenging Times". Bird is shown to be quite a shy and reserved person who hardly ever talks. When he first arrives he always wears headphones. The headphones appear to help him distance himself from difficult situations. Bird's younger brother "Jay" is more talkative than Bird, and is protective of him. Jay says that he and Bird have been in 10 different homes, and they both move into the 'Dumping Ground' in the middle of the night. In the episode "Two Sides to Every Story", it is confirmed that Bird has diabetes. In the same episode, when Jay tells Mike and Fiona that May-Li hit him, Bird supports him, but after talking to Sasha, he decides to tell the truth. This clears May-Li of the allegation and protects her job. Jay is not happy with Bird after this, but they make up when Bird convinces Jay to give Ashdene Ridge a chance. Sasha tells Bird that the home, Mike and May-Li are different from those he and Jay have known before. He and Jay later become good friends with Candi-Rose and Chloe. He is two years older than Jay.

In "Broken Record", after encountering their father in public, Bird remained sceptical about his claims of having changed. His doubts were soon proven correct, after learning that their father was actually homeless and wanted Jay to live with him, but not Bird. Bird later confronted him about this, only to be told that he was not actually his son.

In "My Greatest Composition", Bird believes that a famous musician named Femi is his real father so he sets off to find him. After questioning Femi, he discovers that Femi never had any children but that his real father is Femi's brother, Nana. After the truth is revealed, Bird is invited by Nana to go on tour with him. In the following episode, Bird moves out of the Dumping Ground to go on tour with Nana but Bird makes a guest appearance in series 10, episode 18.

=== Jay Wallis ===
Jay Wallis
- Tracy Beaker character
- Portrayed by: Cole Wealleans-Watts
- Duration: 2018–2023
- First appearance: "Challenging Times"; 23 February 2018
- Last appearance: "Life Is What You Bake It"; 9 June 2023
- Introduced by: Jonathan Phillips
In-universe information
- Occupation: Student
- Father: Reggie Wallis
- Half-brothers: Bird Wallis

Jacob "Jay" Wallis, played by Cole Wealleans-Watts, made his first appearance on 23 February 2018 in series 6 of The Dumping Ground during the episode "Challenging Times".

Jay is protective of his quieter older brother, Bird. He says that they have lived in ten different homes before arriving at the Dumping Ground in the middle of the night. In "Two Sides to Every Story", Jay resents May-Li's diet and exercise plan for Bird's diabetes, especially when she asks Jay to participate in support of his brother. He falsely tells Mike that May-Li hit him hard on the arm and persuades Bird to back up his account. Mike's former girlfriend Fiona, also a care worker, is present and insists that the allegation must be investigated. She tells May-Li to go home, despite Mike's belief that May-Li would never hurt a child in her care. Floss overhears and tells the others, who confront Jay and Bird until Mike intervenes. Sasha later questions the brothers in the attic, where they maintain their story. After Mike stops the questioning, Sasha speaks to Bird privately and urges him to give the home a chance and tell the truth. Bird admits that Jay lied, clearing May-Li. Jay feels betrayed and tries to run away, but Bird persuades him to stay, explaining that he is tired of moving between homes.

Jay is shown to be incredibly smart as he does well academically. He applied for a place at a prestigious private school as he got a great result of 93% in an entrance exam. However, he became upset when he did not get it.

In "Trouble in Paradise", Jay and new boy Nazeer did not get along well. Their rivalry started when Nazeer already knew a "magic" trick that Jay was showing the rest of the 'DG', which turned out to be a prank. It escalated quickly when Jay called Sid weird and Nazeer got upset by this. He comforted Sid, which made Jay mad. The rivalry continued in "Go Your Own Way" when the 'DG' Olympics were held. Jay was made team captain of the "Top Dogs" and Sid was made team captain of the "Underdogs". Jay laughed at the fact Sid was team captain and said that winning would be a piece of cake. Sid eventually led his team to victory, upsetting Jay.

Jay is also a skilled liar, which upsets Bird, who wants him to be honest. Their disagreement is explored in "Moment of Truth" (series 9, episode 1).

Jay leaves in series 10, episode 15 to work in the space centre.

=== Sid Khan ===
Sid Khan
- Tracy Beaker character
- Portrayed by: Josh Sangha
- Duration: Since 4 January 2019
- First appearance: "Rage"; 4 January 2019
- Introduced by: Jonathan Philips
In-universe information
- Occupation: Student
- Aunts: Jean

Sid Khan, played by Josh Sangha, is a character introduced in the first episode of series 7 of The Dumping Ground. He is of Indian heritage, with roots in Mauritius. He is mischievous and eccentric, carries a doll and wears unusual clothes. Little is initially revealed about his background. He later makes friends with Taz and then Katy when Katy arrives at the 'DG'. He is very sad when May-Li resigns after the first episode of series 8 of the 'Dumping Ground' and tries to find May-Li. It is unclear why Sid was initially put into care, but he tells Jody that when he first arrived at his old care home, he ran away and found his doll, Fred, in a dumpster. He kept Fred because he felt like they were the same, as they were both unwanted. He has also talked about his aunt, who was his foster parent for a short amount of time. He used to help her do her makeup, and when he left her, she gave him a makeup mirror to remind him of her. In "Go Your Own Way", Jody gave him the Peter Pan book, which was passed onto different care children when they leave care. In series 9, a man says that he performed on stage with Fred before losing the doll and asks for him back. Sid is reluctant but agrees to return Fred.

Sid does not appear in series 11 but returns in series 12 and also appears in series 13.

=== Bec Hyde ===
Bec Hyde
- Tracy Beaker character
- Portrayed by: Ava Potter
- Duration: 2019–2020, 2021-2022
- First appearance: "Go Fish"; 1 November 2019
- Last appearance: "Breaking Chains"; 25 March 2022
- Introduced by: Jonathan Phillips
In-universe information
- Occupation: Student
- Grandmothers: Joan Hyde
- Aunts: Hannah

Rebecca "Bec" Hyde, played by Ava Potter, is first introduced in the 18th episode of the seventh series. She is seen as a difficult person when Sid and Taz want to introduce themselves. She is initially reluctant to talk. It is later revealed that her emotionally abusive grandmother, who took her in after her mother died, bullied her and treated her as a servant. This creates tension between her and the other residents, especially at the welcome meal, where she will not eat with the others. She appears reluctant to live at the home.

Two episodes later, in the episode "Champions", it is revealed that she does not want any friends, and she says this in front of Floss.

In the final episode of series 7 ("The Last Dance"), she re-encountered a girl, Evie, who had previously bullied her. As Evie was picking on Floss at the time, she stuck up for Floss in front of Evie.

In series 8, she reveals to Taz that it is the anniversary of her mother's death. Taz tells everyone this, making Bec very angry. Later on, a stray dog becomes attached to her and follows her to Ashdene Ridge. Bec tries to hide the dog from May-Li and Scott.

In the second episode of series 9, Candi-Rose reveals that Bec has moved back to live with her aunt. However, in episode 11, it emerges that her aunt is ill and her grandmother, who moved in a few months earlier, has resumed abusing Bec. When Ruby discovers this, Bec is taken back to Ashdene Ridge.

In the series 9 finale, Bec meets a girl called Joy and starts to have feelings for her after spending some time with her. However, when she learns that Joy already has a boyfriend, she is upset and does not want to spend time with her. Jay gets her to open up and she reveals that she might like girls but is still figuring things out and that it is up to her to decide when she is ready to share. She also apologises to Joy for her attitude and makes up with her.

Bec does not return in series 10.

=== Katy White ===
Katy White
- Tracy Beaker character
- Portrayed by: Anya Cooke
- Duration: 2019–2022
- First appearance: "Mighty Mike Milligan"; 29 November 2019
- Last appearance: "Breaking Chains"; 25 March 2022
- Introduced by: Jonathan Phillips
In-universe information
- Occupation: Student
- Mother: Maria White

Katy White was introduced in series 7, episode 23 "Mighty Mike Milligan". She required much convincing to come and live at Ashdene Ridge and leave her mother and tried to escape back to her mother. She made friends with Taz and Sid in early series 8. She is in care because her mother has a drinking problem.

Katy does not return in series 10.

=== Scott Murray ===
Scott Murray
- Tracy Beaker character
- Portrayed by: Louis Payne
- Duration: 2020–2022
- First appearance: "Natural Selection"; 10 January 2020
- Last appearance: "Breaking Chains"; 25 March 2022
- Introduced by: Jonathan Phillips
In-universe information
- Occupation: Care Worker
- Brothers: Nathan Murray

Scott Murray, portrayed by Louis Payne, was a temporary care worker introduced in series 8 but then became a permanent care worker at Ashdene Ridge by the end of episode 2. Floss discovers how good he is at scamming in series 8, episode 4 and Taz gives Scott a hard time (in episode 7) when she escapes the 'DG' to go into the town centre and use her talent of piano playing to raise money as her father is running low on money. In series 8, episode 16, Scott and Viv volunteer at a food bank and he catches someone stealing food.

Scott does not return for series 10, the reason is not discussed on-screen, and the character has not been mentioned since.

=== Viv ===
Viv
- Tracy Beaker character
- Portrayed by: Chloe Lea
- Duration: 2020–2021
- First appearance: "Sugar and Spice"; 7 February 2020
- Last appearance: "Dream Life"; 5 February 2021
- Introduced by: Jonathan Phillips
In-universe information
- Occupation: Student
- Uncles: Ray

Viv, played by Chloe Lea, lived with her uncle Ray but as her uncle kept stealing things to pay the rent, she was taken to a care home. She had lived in at least two care homes before coming to Ashdene Ridge.

Viv came to live at Ashdene Ridge in episode 5 of series 8 of the 'Dumping Ground'. In this episode, she meets Sasha and she and Sasha become competitive over general knowledge of some of the other young people at Ashdene Ridge.

In series 8, episode 10 ("Do the right thing"), Viv leaves to live with her uncle Ray again, believing that he has changed. However, she soon discovers that her uncle is still stealing after losing his job and struggling to pay the rent. Annoyed, she returns to Ashdene Ridge. In series 9, it is mentioned in the first episode by Jay that Viv has once again moved in with her uncle. Viv is funny, competitive and friendly, and has a known passion for football - specifically Manchester United.

The actress did not return for series 9 filming for personal reasons and also filming another show at the time.

=== Nazeer ===
Nazeer
- Tracy Beaker character
- Portrayed by: Tut Nyuot
- Duration: 2020
- First appearance: "Trouble in Paradise"; 20 March 2020
- Last appearance: "Truth or Scare"; 23 October 2020
- Introduced by: Jonathan Phillips
In-universe information
- Occupation: Student

Nazeer, played by Tut Nyuot, used to live with his father. They enjoyed building electric models together and were regarded as eccentric, much as Sid is at the Dumping Ground. Nazeer's circumstances changed after his stepmother arrived, and he was eventually taken into care.

Nazeer first appeared in episode 11 ("Trouble in Paradise") and Jay soon started to dislike Nazeer and tries to prove to Nazeer that he is in charge of the 'DG'. Jay is unkind to Sid while trying to prove this. Nazeer and Sid later become friends and Jay and Nazeer officially become enemies.

In "Great Expectations", May-Li mentions that he has moved back in with his father.

=== Ruby Butler ===
Ruby Butler
- Tracy Beaker character
- Portrayed by: Liv De-Vulgt
- Duration: 2020–2022
- First appearance: "Keeping Face"; 9 October 2020
- Introduced by: Jonathan Phillips
In-universe information
- Occupation: Student
- Mother: Hazel Butler

Ruby Butler, played by Liv De-Vulgt, made her first appearance in the series 8 episode "Keeping Face", broadcast on 9 October 2020. Introduced as a guest character, she joined the main cast in the series 9 episode "Run, Rescue, Repeat", broadcast on 13 August 2021. She is due to return in series 14.

Ruby was placed into care after her mother (Nia Gwynne) was sent to prison for the accident which killed Bec Hyde's (Ava Potter) mother. She remained in care after her mother was released early due to her release conditions requiring her to avoid contact. She is placed into Ashdene Ridge temporarily and shares a room with Bec. The pair begin to strike up a friendship until Bec learns of her mother's identity. Enraged at her early release, Bec tricks Ruby into going to see her mother so as to send her back to prison for breaching her release conditions. May-Li (Stacy Liu), having learned the truth about the pair, arrives, but Bec's conscience gets the better of her and she changes her mind about calling the police. Ruby is subsequently moved to a different care home.

At some point Ruby returns to live with her mother, but her struggles to adjust lead to Ruby returning to Ashdene Ridge. With Bec now gone, Ruby tries too hard to fit in, claiming to like everything the others say they do despite having no knowledge of most of it. After being tricked by Clem (Halle Cassell), Ruby admits she copied everyone because she did not fit in at her last home, with everyone there considering her weird. May-Li encourages her to open up, which she does.

In episode 11, she decides to visit Bec to thank her for how things are going with her and her mother but she discovers that Bec is living rough at her aunt's farm because her aunt is ill and her gran has moved in and has been abusing Bec. Thanks to Sasha, Scott is able to find out and rescue Bec from her situation.

Ruby does not appear in series 10–13 and is due to return in series 14.

=== Max Riley ===
Max Riley
- Tracy Beaker character
- Portrayed by: Jed Jefferson
- Duration: 2020–2022
- First appearance: "Everybody Needs a Friend"; 16 October 2020
- Last appearance: "Rocket Man"; 18 March 2022
- Introduced by: Jonathan Phillips
In-universe information
- Occupation: Student

Max Riley, played by Jed Jefferson, made his first appearance in episode 16 ("Everybody Needs a Friend") as a new roommate and friend for Sid. It is mentioned in "Sasha Claus" that his parents would often quarrel but Christmas would reunite them. However, in series 9, his father gives him a video game and towards the end of the series, Max goes to stay with him for a bit.

Max does not return in series 10. Jefferson confirmed on Twitter that he would not return and was filming another drama for CBBC.

=== Clem Stephens ===
Clem Stephens
- Tracy Beaker character
- Portrayed by: Halle Cassell
- Duration: 2021–2023
- First appearance: "Partners in Crime"; 16 July 2021
- Last appearance: "Bright Sparks"; 23 June 2023
- Introduced by: Jonathan Phillips
In-universe information
- Occupation: Student
- Sisters: Nicole

Clementine "Clem" Stephens, played by Halle Cassell, made her first appearance in series 9, episode 6 ("Partners in Crime"). In episode 11 of series 9, it was revealed that she is used to moving around often and she has an older sister named Nicole with her own flat. In episode 5 of series 10, Clem is diagnosed with ADHD.

She does not return in series 11.

=== Kyle Lawton ===
Kyle Lawton
- Tracy Beaker character
- Portrayed by: Freddy Smith
- Duration: 2022–2023
- First appearance: "The Beat Goes On"; 18 Feb 2022
- Last appearance: "Bright Sparks"; 23 June 2023
- Introduced by: Jonathan Phillips
In-universe information
- Occupation: Student
- Father: Gary Lawton

Kyle Lawton, played by Freddy Smith, made his first appearance in series 9, episode 15 ("The Beat Goes On"). He is moody and often snaps at the other children, though the arrival of Hugo in "A Hole New Start" allows him to show his more caring side and the two strike up a brotherly relationship. This culminates in "Bright Sparks", the finale of series 10, when he rescues Hugo from the Ashdene Ridge fire.

He also has a difficult relationship with his father, who often lets him down, and recruits him for a crime in "Take Flight". It is revealed in "Under New Management" that his father has been arrested for theft.

He does not return in series 11.

=== Ben Pratt ===
Ben Pratt
- Tracy Beaker character
- Portrayed by: William Wyn Davies
- Duration: 2022–2025
- First appearance: "A Whole New Start"; 30 Sep 2022
- Introduced by: Jonathan Phillips
In-universe information
- Occupation: Care Worker
- Spouse: Dan (fiancé)

Benjamin "Ben" H. Pratt, played by William Wyn Davies, made his first appearance in series 10, episode 1 ("A Whole New Start") and replaces Scott as a care worker.

In series 13, episode 4, Ben announces that he is going to marry his boyfriend, Dan, and move to Australia to live with him.

Ben Pratt leaves the care home to live in Australia.

=== Bonnie Vasiliou ===
Bonnie Vasiliou
- Tracy Beaker character
- Portrayed by: Lara Mehmet
- Duration: 2022–2026
- First appearance: "A Whole New Start"; 30 Sep 2022
- Last appearance: "Gifted"; 2026
- Introduced by: Jonathan Phillips
In-universe information
- Occupation: Student
- Brothers: Fraser Vasiliou

Bonnie Vasiliou, played by Lara Mehmet, made her first appearance in series 10, episode 1 ("A Whole New Start"). She is the older sister of Fraser Vasiliou.

=== Fraser Vasiliou ===
Fraser Vasiliou
- Tracy Beaker character
- Portrayed by: Massimo Cull
- Duration: 2022–2024
- First appearance: "A Whole New Start"; 30 Sep 2022
- Last appearance: "Day Trip"; 6 December 2024
- Introduced by: Jonathan Phillips
In-universe information
- Occupation: Student
- Sisters: Bonnie Vasiliou

Fraser Vasiliou, played by Massimo Cull, made his first appearance in series 10, episode 1 ("A Whole New Start"). He is the younger brother of Bonnie Vasiliou.

Fraser left off-screen after series 12 to join a football academy.

=== Sabrina Moxley ===
Sabrina Moxley
- Tracy Beaker character
- Portrayed by: Florrie Wilkinson
- Duration: 2022–2024
- First appearance: "A Whole New Start"; 30 Sep 2022
- Last appearance: "Bring the House Down"; 22 March 2024
- Introduced by: Jonathan Phillips
In-universe information
- Occupation: Student

Sabrina Moxley, played by Florrie Wilkinson, made her first appearance in series 10, episode 1 ("A Whole New Start") and her final appearance in series 11, episode 10.

=== Hugo Little ===
Hugo Little
- Tracy Beaker character
- Portrayed by: Hugo Nash
- Duration: 2022–2023
- First appearance: "A Whole New Start"; 30 Sep 2022
- Last appearance: "Bright Sparks"; 23 June 2023
- Introduced by: Jonathan Phillips
In-universe information
- Occupation: Student

Hugo Little, played by Hugo Nash, made his first appearance in series 10, episode 1 ("A Whole New Start"). Hugo owns a treasured teddy bear named "Little Hug". Hugo was closest to Kyle, viewing him as an older brother figure.

He does not return to series 11, nor does Little Hug.

=== Wes Oldfield ===
Wes Oldfield
- Tracy Beaker character
- Portrayed by: Owen Phillips
- Duration: 2022–
- First appearance: "A Whole New Start"; 30 Sep 2022
- Introduced by: Jonathan Phillips
In-universe information
- Occupation: Student
- Father: Shane Oldfield
- Grandfathers: Jack Oldfield
- Grandmothers: Dorothy Oldfield

Wesley "Wes" Oldfield, played by Owen Phillips, made his first appearance in series 10, episode 1 ("A Whole New Start").

=== Doreen Adebayo ===
Doreen Adebayo
- Tracy Beaker character
- Portrayed by: Andrea Hall
- Duration: 2022–
- First appearance: "A Whole New Start"; 30 Sep 2022
- Introduced by: Jonathan Phillips
In-universe information
- Occupation: Regional Care Manager; Head Care Worker

Doreen Adebayo, played by Andrea Hall, made her first appearance in series 10, episode 1 ("A Whole New Start"). She was the head care worker at Ashdene Ridge after the fire started. She is the regional care manager of Pottiswood and was formerly the temporary head care worker at the former care home Bridley Hill. She becomes the replacement care worker for May-Li Wang in "Under New Management".

Doreen is firm and fair, helping Clem be aware of her potential ADHD in "Frogs On A Train" and stopping Candi-Rose's parents from getting hold of her in "The Hardest Word", though she shows her stricter side in "Under New Management" when she imposes new rules, leading to a rebellion fronted by Floss. Doreen has the children's best interests at heart, and presses Floss about her pathway plan throughout the second half of series 10 because she knows Floss has a bright future ahead of her.

=== Maisie Martin ===
Maisie Martin
- Tracy Beaker character
- Portrayed by: Mimi Robertson
- Duration: 2023–
- First appearance: "Natural Habitat"; 5 May 2023
- Introduced by: Jonathan Phillips
In-universe information
- Occupation: Student
- Mother: Diane Martin
- Aunts: Pat Martin

Maisie Martin, played by Mimi Robertson, made her first appearance in series 10, episode 13 ("Natural Habitat"), in which she deceives Taz De Souza and the others into raising money for otters. In fact, she plans to keep the money to support her disabled mother.

Maisie returns in series 11, episode 1 ("Welcome Home") as a resident, after it was deemed her mother was no longer in a state to care for her. She resents being put into the care system, and views it only as a temporary measure until she can return to her mother. Her character displays a volatile and selfish attitude, often lashing out when upset by disrupting the other children's happiness. She shares a room with Chelsey and, despite initially finding her cheerful manner and vlogging annoying, becomes close friends with her. She also befriends Brodie when he moves into the house in series 11, episode 4.

In series 11 she stole Dita's diary in episode 3, then read it aloud to the other children after taking offence to what she had written about her. In episode 8 she accidentally damaged Wes' book, then lied about it and attempted to frame Jimi for it before being caught, taking heavy criticism from several of the children. In the following episode ("Fly Away Home") she attempted to run away from the house after taking this criticism to heart, feeling that nobody likes her. She is eventually returned by Georgia and Brodie.

In series 12 episode 5 ("Best Day Ever") a visit to her mother was cancelled, so she took her frustration out on Erin's annual Treasure Hunt by sabotaging it.

=== Izzy Musonda ===
Izzy Musonda
- Tracy Beaker character
- Portrayed by: Zanele Nyoni
- Duration: 2023–2025
- First appearance: "The Mole Hunt"; 28 April 2023
- Last appearance: "Tangled"; 28 February 2025
- Introduced by: Jonathan Phillips
In-universe information
- Occupation: Student
- Father: unnamed father
- Aunts: unnamed aunt

Izzy Musonda, played by Zanele Nyoni, made her first appearance in series 10, episode 12 ("The Mole Hunt").

Before entering care, Izzy lived with her father. They shared a passion for repairing and upcycling discarded items into useful objects, such as go-karts and gadgets. Izzy witnessed her father suffer a fatal heart attack. She was subsequently placed in care and moved to Ashdene Ridge.

Izzy was closest to Dita, Erin and Harmony.

In series 13 she left off-screen to live with her aunt, but came back briefly to help Erin and Harmony fix Shanice's hair problems.

=== Dita Okomo ===
Dita Okomo
- Tracy Beaker character
- Portrayed by: Kayleen Ngeuma
- Duration: 2023–2024
- First appearance: "Sister to Sister"; 26 May 2023
- Last appearance: "Day Trip"; 6 December 2024
- Introduced by: Jonathan Phillips
In-universe information
- Occupation: Student

Dita Okomo, played by Kayleen Ngeuma, made her first appearance in series 10, episode 16 ("Sister to Sister").

Dita left off-screen between series 12 and series 13 for unknown reasons.

=== Frankie ===
Frankie
- Tracy Beaker character
- Portrayed by: Blake Robinson
- Duration: 2024–
- First appearance: "Welcome Home"; 26 January 2024
- Introduced by: Jonathan Phillips
In-universe information
- Occupation: Student

Frankie, played by Blake Robinson, made his first appearance in series 11, episode 1 ("Welcome Home"). Viewed as the main troublemaker of the house, he displays a mischievous and bossy character. He is the self-appointed leader of a club containing Oscar and Shanice, located in a hidden den within the house. He regularly plots ambitious schemes, usually with the aim of making money or getting out of events.

In series 11 he immediately announces himself to the new arrivals by tricking them into donating money to a fictitious charity. In episode 2 ("I Can Explain") he organises a kung fu match with an admission charge between Shanice and Izzy. In the series finale he and his sidekicks attempt to get out of attending Sabrina and Bonnie's concert by pretending they contracted fleas, only for Georgia to stymie the plan when she says they are highly contagious and places the whole house into lockdown.

In series 12 Sid joins the club after discovering their secret den. In episode 8 ("Day Trip") he and his gang lie about going on either of the day trips and end up staying home alone.

=== Oscar Norris ===
Oscar Norris
- Tracy Beaker character
- Portrayed by: Michael Carpenter
- Duration: 2024–
- First appearance: "Welcome Home"; 26 January 2024
- Introduced by: Jonathan Phillips
In-universe information
- Occupation: Student
- Father: Tom Chance

Oscar Norris, played by Michael Carpenter, made his first appearance in series 11, episode 1 ("Welcome Home"). He is closest to Frankie and Shanice, his two partners in crime. The three love to scheme and plan pranks to pull on anyone and everyone. Oscar is naive but occasionally stands up to Frankie, the group's leader.

In series 13, episode 6, Oscar met Tom Chance, his dad, for the first time. Tom is a magician who performs magic shows on cruise ships.

=== Shanice ===
Shanice
- Tracy Beaker character
- Portrayed by: Raniah Morton
- Duration: 2024–
- First appearance: "Welcome Home"; 26 January 2024
- Introduced by: Jonathan Phillips
In-universe information
- Occupation: Student

Shanice, played by Raniah Morton, made her first appearance in series 11, episode 1 ("Welcome Home"). Part of Frankie's secret club, she frequently joins the others in causing trouble. She can be sarcastic and often criticises Frankie's schemes.

In series 12 episode 6 ("Swapsies") she has a falling out with Doreen, before a magical pair of dance shoes she purchased causes them to switch bodies for a day.

=== Georgia Finch ===
Georgia Finch
- Tracy Beaker character
- Portrayed by: Rochelle Goldie
- Duration: 2024
- First appearance: "Welcome Home!"; 26 January 2024
- Last appearance: "Day Trip"; 6 December 2024
- Introduced by: Jonathan Phillips
In-universe information
- Occupation: Care worker Co-head care worker

Georgia Finch, portrayed by Rochelle Goldie, made her first appearance on 26 January 2024 in series 11 of The Dumping Ground during the episode "Welcome Home" as the co-head care worker of Porters Lodge, the new Dumping Ground. In the ninth episode of series 11, it is revealed that Georgia grew up in care after Maisie notices that the bird tattoo on her leg resembles a drawing on Maisie's bedroom wall.

Rochelle Goldie appeared in The Dumping Ground before her debut as Georgia, as an extra at the prom in series 7. She can be seen hanging out with Evie, the rival of Bec Hyde.

=== Jimi ===
Jimi
- Tracy Beaker character
- Portrayed by: Moses Amedzro
- Duration: 2024–2025
- First appearance: "Welcome Home"; 26 January 2024
- Last appearance: "Game Over"; 31 January 2025
- Introduced by: Jonathan Phillips
In-universe information
- Occupation: Student
- Brothers: Leon

Jimi, played by Moses Amedzro, made his first appearance in series 11, episode 1 ("Welcome Home"). An avid gamer, he displays a lazy and often slobbish attitude. He shares a room with Wes, with his messy side of the room being a stark contrast to that of his well-presented roommate.

Jimi was moved to another care home after his older brother tracked him down at Porters Lodge, for his own safety.

=== Erin ===
Erin
- Tracy Beaker character
- Portrayed by: Robyn Elwell
- Duration: 2024–
- First appearance: "Welcome Home"; 26 January 2024
- Introduced by: Jonathan Phillips
In-universe information
- Occupation: Student

Erin, played by Robyn Elwell, made her first appearance in series 11, episode 1 ("Welcome Home"). She is kind, upbeat and proactive, but also anxious and highly strung. She is talented at baking and arts and crafts.

In series 12 episode 5 ("Best Day Ever"), she reveals to Maisie that her parents were supposed to return for her five years previously, but never showed up and have not been in contact since. Consequently, she organises a treasure hunt on that same day every year in order to please the other children and hide her pain over the memory.

=== Chelsey Watts ===
Chelsey Watts
- Tracy Beaker character
- Portrayed by: Emme Patrick
- Duration: 2024–
- First appearance: "Welcome Home"; 26 January 2024
- Introduced by: Jonathan Phillips
In-universe information
- Occupation: Student
- Sisters: Keira
- Aunts: Janice (foster)

Chelsey Watts, played by Emme Patrick, made her first appearance in series 11, episode 1 ("Welcome Home"). She presents a vain and self-obsessed character, her main obsession being running a personal vlog detailing her "life hacks", although she does on several occasions display a more thoughtful attitude. She shares a room with Maisie and has become close friends with both her and Brodie.

In series 12 episode 3 ("Trouble Doubled") she discovers she has an estranged twin sister called Keira (played by Emme Patrick's real-life twin sister Eden) who was fostered. They were abandoned separately as infants and picked up by different care homes. After visiting Keira's home she is overwhelmed at seeing the life she feels she could have had, but eventually decides to befriend her sister.

In series 13 episode 3 ("WrestlePalooza") Chelsey began developing feelings for Brodie, and pretended to be into Wrestling just so she could spend more time with him. She ultimately decided not to act on her feelings because a romantic relationship would mean they could no longer live in the same care home.

=== Brodie ===
Brodie
- Tracy Beaker character
- Portrayed by: Charlie Geany
- Duration: 2024–
- First appearance: "Seeing Red"; 16 February 2024
- Introduced by: Jonathan Phillips
In-universe information
- Occupation: Student

Brodie, played by Charlie Geany, made his first appearance in series 11, episode 4 ("Seeing Red"). He displays a caring and helpful attitude, particularly towards Maisie and Chelsey.

In series 11 he immediately befriends Maisie by assisting her in stealing her personal file from the carers' office. In episode 8 ("Big Little Fibs") he and Chelsey try to organise a surprise for an upset Maisie, then in the following episode attempt to track her down after she runs away from the house.

In series 12 episode 7 ("The Howling") he attempts to hide a stray dog in the house during a storm. He reveals the dog reminds him of the one he used to have, and that when he was first placed in care after being abandoned his dog was all he had left.

=== Harmony ===
Harmony
- Tracy Beaker character
- Portrayed by: Alexandra Perez Ramos
- Duration: 2025–
- First appearance: "The Wild Card"; 17 January 2025
- Introduced by: Jonathan Phillips
In-universe information
- Occupation: Student
- Sisters: Phoenix

Harmony, played by Alexandra Perez Ramos, made her first appearance in series 13, episode 1 ("The Wild Card").

=== Phoenix ===
Phoenix
- Tracy Beaker character
- Portrayed by: Marni Moore
- Duration: 2025–
- First appearance: "The Wild Card"; 17 January 2025
- Introduced by: Jonathan Phillips
In-universe information
- Occupation: Student
- Sisters: Harmony

Phoenix, played by Marni Moore, made her first appearance in series 13, episode 1 ("The Wild Card"). She is the younger sister of Harmony.

=== Anne Costello ===
Anne Costello
- Tracy Beaker character
- Portrayed by: Paula Penman
- Duration: 2025–
- First appearance: "The Wild Card"; 17 January 2025
- Introduced by: Jonathan Phillips
In-universe information
- Occupation: Care Worker; Prison Officer (formerly)

Anne Costello, played by Paula Penman, made her first appearance in series 13, episode 1 ("The Wild Card").

Before becoming a care worker, Anne used to work in a prison as a prison officer.

=== Bernie ===
Bernie
- Tracy Beaker character
- Portrayed by: Dave Johns
- Duration: 2025-
- First appearance: "WrestlePalooza"; 24 January 2025
- Introduced by: Jonathan Phillips
In-universe information
- Occupation: Gardener

Bernie, portrayed by Dave Johns, made his first appearance on 24 January 2025 in series 13 of The Dumping Ground during the episode "WrestlePalooza" as the new gardener and handyman for Porters Lodge.

Although not a care worker, Bernie is shown to care about the children at the Dumping Ground.

=== Sami ===
Sami
- Tracy Beaker character
- Portrayed by: Joseph Oshiotse
- Duration: 2025–
- First appearance: "The Right Place"; 7 February 2025
- Introduced by: Jonathan Phillips
In-universe information
- Occupation: Student

Sami, played by Joseph Oshiotse, made his first appearance in series 13, episode 5 ("The Right Place").

=== Hana ===
Hana
- Tracy Beaker character
- Portrayed by: Kanon Narumi
- Duration: 2025–
- First appearance: "The Magician's Oath"; 14 February 2025
- Introduced by: Jonathan Phillips
In-universe information
- Occupation: Student

Hana, played by Kanon Narumi, made her first appearance in series 13, episode 6 ("The Magician's Oath").

=== Vinny ===
Vinny
- Tracy Beaker character
- Portrayed by: Henry Wright
- Duration: 2025–
- First appearance: "Chaos and Confusions"; 21 February 2025
- Introduced by: Jonathan Phillips
In-universe information
- Occupation: Student

Vinny, played by Henry Wright, made his first appearance in series 13, episode 7 ("Chaos and Confusions").

== Guest characters ==
=== Kingsley Jackson ===
Kingsley Jackson
- The Dumping Ground character
- Portrayed by: David Avery
- Duration: 2013, 2016
- First appearance: "S.O.S."; 18 January 2013
- Last appearance: "Two For Joy"; 2 December 2016
- Introduced by: Foz Allan
In-universe information
- Mother: Denise Jackson
- Brothers: Luke Jackson
- Sisters: Jody Jackson

Kingsley Jackson, portrayed by David Avery, made his first appearance on 18 January 2013 in series 1 of The Dumping Ground during the episode "S.O.S.".

When Jody (Kia Pegg) moves back home to Kingsley, their mother Denise (Victoria Alcock) and brother Luke (James Bartlett), Gina visits Jody with Carmen (Amy-Leigh Hickman) and Tyler (Miles Butler-Houghton). When Gina, Carmen and Tyler leave, Denise and Kingsley do not want Jody's friends visiting. Jody runs away to The Dumping Ground, giving the others presents and Mike (Connor Byrne) arranges for Jody to stay the night and for their social worker, Rob (Neil Armstrong) to sort things out the following day. Kingsley and Denise arrive the following day to collect Jody and she reluctantly agrees to return. Jody tells the others that she needs the presents back because they belong to Kingsley, who has no idea she has taken them. Carmen, Tyler, Tee (Mia McKenna-Bruce) and Lily (Jessie Williams) go to Jody's house when Carmen cannot reach her on the mobile phone she gave her. Carmen and Tyler sneak into the house and go to Jody's room, which is filled with stolen, expensive goods. When Kingsley arrives home, Carmen and Tyler hide in Jody's room. Kingsley is angry to find the door unlocked and Carmen's phone, which he believes belongs to Jody. He locks Jody in her bedroom. Tee sends Elektra (Jessica Revell) a video of Tyler sending a Morse code message for Gus (Noah Marullo) to work out. Gus works out they are saying "S.O.S". When Kingsley learns that Carmen and Tyler have been with Jody the whole time, he threatens them to make them stay quiet. Gina arrives and she is angry with Denise for not protecting Jody and Jody returns to the Dumping Ground.

With Kingsley's trial coming up, Denise does not want Jody to testify, but after dreaming about being in Alice's Adventures in Wonderland, Jody decides to testify against Kingsley.

Jody is pleased to see Kingsley when he moves into his new flat and Kingsley reassures Jody that going to prison was not her fault. Kingsley introduces her to his girlfriend, Rosie (Zoe Iqbal) and Jody lets them sell Mike's carriage clock when Kingsley owes money to a gang. Kingsley tells Jody to leave the door of the Dumping Ground open, so he and Rosie can steal things. Jody is trapped in a fire at Kingsley's flat and Kingsley runs off when he finds out. Jody later confronts Kingsley after learning that he did not try to save her. Rosie overhears, returns Mike's clock to Jody and reveals that the gang was invented to trick Jody into stealing things for them to sell. Rosie then ends her relationship with Kingsley.

Years later, Jody learns that Kingsley was killed in a car accident and struggles to move on from the situation. With Tyler's help, she begins to come to terms with Kingsley's abuse and death.

In series 9, episode 20, Kingsley died off-screen in a car crash. Jody was the only member of his family to attend his funeral.

=== Denise Jackson ===
Denise Jackson
- The Dumping Ground character
- Portrayed by: Victoria Alcock
- Duration: 2013, 2018
- First appearance: "S.O.S."; 18 January 2013
- Last appearance: "Saved By the Bell"; 19 January 2018
- Introduced by: Foz Allan
In-universe information
- Sons: Kingsley Jackson; Luke Jackson
- Daughters: Jody Jackson

Denise Jackson, portrayed by Victoria Alcock, made her first appearance on 18 January 2013 in series 1 of The Dumping Ground during the episode "S.O.S.". She is Jody's emotionally abusive mother.

When Jody (Kia Pegg) moves back home to Denise and her brothers, Kingsley (David Avery) and Luke (James Bartlett), Gina (Kay Purcell) visits Jody with Carmen (Amy-Leigh Hickman) and Tyler (Miles Butler-Houghton). When Gina, Carmen and Tyler leave, Denise and Kingsley do not want Jody's friends visiting. Jody runs away to The Dumping Ground, giving the others presents and Mike (Connor Byrne) arranges for Jody to stay the night and for their social worker, Rob (Neil Armstrong) to sort things out the following day. Kingsley and Denise arrive the following day to collect Jody and she reluctantly agrees to return. Jody tells the others she needs the presents back as they belong to Kingsley, who has no idea she has taken them. Carmen, Tyler, Tee (Mia McKenna-Bruce) and Lily (Jessie Williams) go to Jody's house when Carmen cannot reach her on the mobile phone she gave her. Carmen and Tyler sneak into the house and go to Jody's room, which is filled with stolen, expensive goods. When Kingsley arrives home, Carmen and Tyler hide in Jody's room. Kingsley is angry to find the door unlocked and Carmen's phone, which he believes belongs to Jody. He locks Jody in her bedroom. Tee sends Elektra (Jessica Revell) a video of Tyler sending a Morse code message for Gus (Noah Marullo) to work out. Gus works out they are saying "S.O.S". When Kingsley discovers Carmen and Tyler have been with Jody the whole time, he threatens them to make them stay quiet. Gina arrives and is furious that Denise knew about Kingsley's abuse but did nothing to protect Jody. Luke convinces his mother that the Dumping Ground is the best place for Jody as she is better off with Mike and Gina, and Jody returns to the Dumping Ground.

With Kingsley's trial coming up, Denise does not want Jody to testify, but after dreaming about being in Alice's Adventures in Wonderland, Jody decides to testify against Kingsley, angering Denise. Denise ended up running away, scared of how Kingsley would react to her other children betraying Kingsley.

Denise does not appear in series 3 but is mentioned several times. In "Coming Round", Jody confides in May-Li's grandmother, PoPo, about her family. She is upset that Denise has ignored her since she testified against Kingsley. PoPo suggests that Jody express her feelings in a letter, then put it away rather than send it. Ryan overhears their conversation, finds the letter in Jody's room and posts it. Jody asks Luke to intercept it before Denise can read it.

Denise appears in the opening episode of series 6, "Jody on the Ropes".

=== Luke Jackson ===
Luke Jackson
- The Dumping Ground character
- Portrayed by: James Bartlett
- Duration: 2013, 2021
- First appearance: "S.O.S."; 18 January 2013
- Last appearance: "Snakes and Ladders"; 15 January 2021
- Introduced by: Foz Allan
In-universe information
- Occupation: Call Center Operations Manager
- Mother: Denise Jackson
- Brothers: Kingsley Jackson
- Sisters: Jody Jackson

Luke Jackson, portrayed by James Bartlett, made his first appearance on 18 January 2013 in series 1 of The Dumping Ground during the episode "S.O.S.".

Luke is the middle child of Denise and the older brother of Jody (Kia Pegg) and younger brother of Kingsley (David Avery). When Jody moves back in with Denise, Gina (Kay Purcell) visits Jody with Carmen (Amy-Leigh Hickman) and Tyler (Miles Butler-Houghton). When Kingsley arrives home, Carmen and Tyler hide in Jody's room and Kingsley is angry to find the door unlocked and Carmen's phone, which he believes belongs to Jody. Luke tells Kingsley to go easy on Jody as she is just a child, but Kingsley ignores him and locks Jody in her bedroom. Gina arrives at Jody's when Tee (Mia McKenna-Bruce) sends a Morse code message to Elektra (Jessica Revell) for Gus (Noah Marullo) to work out what is being said, which is "S.O.S". Gina is angry with Denise for not protecting Jody and Luke agrees with Gina, believing that Jody is better off at The Dumping Ground.

In "Jody in Wonderland", Luke initially follows his mother's decision not to give a witness statement against Kingsley, fearing what he might do if he is acquitted. After seeing Jody find the courage to testify, Luke changes his mind and gives a statement to the police.

In series 8, episode 20 (Snakes and Ladders), Luke assigns Jody to some work experience at the Call Center he now manages.

In series 9, episode 20, "Breaking Chains", Luke is overseas and cannot attend Kingsley's funeral, but messages Jody to check that she is all right.

=== Shannay Kelly ===
Shannay Kelly
- The Dumping Ground character
- Portrayed by: Holly Quin-Ankrah
- Duration: 2013
- First appearance: "Baby"; 11 January 2013
- Last appearance: "Seriously Funny"; 8 March 2013
- Introduced by: Foz Allan
In-universe information
- Spouse: Steve Kettle
- Sons: Jonah Kettle
- Stepdaughters: Lily Kettle; Rosie Kettle; Poppy Kettle

Shannay Kelly, portrayed by Holly Quin-Ankrah, made her first appearance on 11 January 2013 in series 1 of The Dumping Ground during the episode "Baby". She is the girlfriend of Steve Kettle, and the mother of Jonah. Steve's daughter Lily (Jessie Williams) was unhappy about her moving in, especially after learning that Shannay is also bringing her cat, Wilbur. Lily therefore goes to the Dumping Ground. Steve visits to talk to Lily with Shannay and an angry Lily tells Steve and Shannay to have the new baby adopted. Lily feels guilty when Shannay goes into labour, but is happy when she learns that she has a brother. When Lily returns home, Steve is upset as Shannay has left; however, Lily persuades Shannay to give things a chance. Lily organises an unsupervised sleepover with Carmen (Amy-Leigh Hickman) and Tee (Mia McKenna-Bruce) by persuading her parents to let her stay at The Dumping Ground when they visit Shannay's sister.

In series 2, Shannay's sister gives her and Steve the opportunity to run her cafe down in Brighton and live in the flat above. They accept and move down there, taking Lily, Jonah, Shadow and Wilbur with them. This ultimately led to Lily's future career, opening her own cafe (The Kettle Stand) and starting her own business.

=== Jimmy Wharton ===
Jimmy Wharton
- The Dumping Ground character
- Portrayed by: Mark Theodore
- Duration: 2014, 2016
- First appearance: "Booting Up"; 10 January 2014
- Last appearance: "Slings and Arrows"; 29 January 2016
- Introduced by: Lis Steele
In-universe information
- Sons: Bailey Wharton

Jimmy Wharton, portrayed by Mark Theodore, made his first appearance on 10 January 2014 in series 2 of The Dumping Ground during the episode "Quitters - Booting Up: Part 2".

Jimmy is the father of Bailey (Kasey McKellar). When Jimmy attempts to take Bailey from The Dumping Ground, Mike (Connor Byrne) and May-Li Wang (Stacy Liu) inform Jimmy that they are legally responsible for Bailey. Inside, Mike and May-Li tell Jimmy he will have to contact social services about getting Bailey back, but Jimmy devastates Bailey when he says that he was not expecting to get Bailey back straight away. Bailey runs away to his father and they attend a football match. However, Jimmy is ejected from the match by a police officer (Jon Regan). To avoid getting into trouble when Jody (Kia Pegg) mentions to the police officer that Jimmy abducted his son, Jimmy lies that he does not have a child, hurting Bailey. Jimmy arrives at the Dumping Ground after learning that Bailey has seen Alison, a woman claiming to be his mother. They discover that she has left. When they find her, Jimmy reveals that Alison is actually Briony, a friend of Bailey's mother. Bailey later makes amends with Jimmy.

=== Sally Lewis ===
Sally Lewis
- The Dumping Ground character
- Portrayed by: Diveen Henry
- Duration: 2014–2016, 2018
- First appearance: "Holding On"; 7 February 2014
- Last appearance: "Faker"; 19 October 2018
- Introduced by: Lis Steele
In-universe information
- Spouse: Kamal Hameed (fiance)
- Sons: Tyler Lewis

Sally Lewis, portrayed by Diveen Henry, made her first appearance on 7 February 2014 in series 2 of The Dumping Ground during the episode "Holding On".

May-Li (Stacy Liu) supervises a day out between Sally and Tyler (Miles Butler-Houghton) at the park. Sally takes Tyler and they sneak away from the park. Sally gets some ice cream; however, she has no money to pay, so she runs away without paying. A community support officer intercepts Sally. May-Li eventually finds Sally and Tyler and she pays for the ice cream. When Tyler learns Sally has not been taking her bipolar medication, he asks May-Li to take him home. Back at The Dumping Ground, Sally and Tyler wait in the quiet room; however, Sally disappears and she locks herself in the bathroom and Tyler gets her to open the door. Sally promises Tyler things will improve.

On a fostering information day, Tyler gets close to a foster parent, Mrs Underwood (Martina Laird) which upsets Sally. When Tyler asks his mum if he has to turn down every potential foster family, Sally decides that he does not as he needs to be in the best place for him.

Tyler is delighted when Sally wants him back and he visits his mother for a meeting with his social worker. Sally shows Tyler his room, which Tyler does not like as it is dinosaur themed. Tyler divides his time between birthday celebrations at the Dumping Ground and his mother's home and Tyler snaps when his mum replaces a photo of the young people with one of them both. Sally and Tyler realise the need to get to know each other and Sally accepts the young people and staff are family too.

=== Lucy Taylor ===
Lucy Taylor
- The Dumping Ground character
- Portrayed by: Sally Rogers
- Duration: 2014–2015
- First appearance: "Hope"; 21 March 2014
- Last appearance: "Dragon Slayer"; 13 March 2015
- Introduced by: Lis Steele
In-universe information
- Sons: Johnny Taylor
- Daughters: Tee Taylor; Hope

Lucy Taylor, portrayed by Sally Rogers, made her first appearance on 21 March 2014 in series 2 of The Dumping Ground during the episode "Holding On". She departed in series 3 during the episode "Dragon Slayer".

Tee (Mia McKenna-Bruce) receives a letter from Lucy and she arranges to meet her at a cafe and Lucy apologises to Tee for letting her down. Tee visits her mum at a women's refuge she is staying at and when Lucy says she wants to introduce her to someone, Tee suspects it is a boyfriend and leaves; however, Lucy goes after Tee and introduces Tee to her half-sister, Hope (Lucy Briggs). Johnny (Joe Maw) goes to find Tee and he meets Hope, but he is angry with Lucy about everything that has happened. Feeling that Hope is not safe with Lucy, Tee takes Hope whilst Lucy is distracted and takes her to The Dumping Ground before pretending to Mike (Connor Byrne) she is an abandoned child. A frantic Lucy turns up at The Dumping Ground to collect Hope and Mike realises that Hope is Johnny and Tee's sister.

Johnny spots his stepfather, Keith (Neil Morrissey), in a park and rushes to tell his mum, but he and Tee are shocked to learn that she knows and that he has been seeing Hope (now Holly and Paige Robinson). When Johnny goes to see his mum, Keith answers the door and Lucy arrives home shortly after. Keith pretends to be friendly toward Johnny, inviting him in, but when Lucy goes in, Keith is horrid to Johnny. Lucy tells Johnny and Tee that Keith will not be staying around as he is moving to Scotland and Johnny tells his mum that she has to think about who really matters. Keith visits The Dumping Ground and complains to Mike about Johnny, accusing him of harassment. When Johnny shows his mum the photos, Lucy thinks it is drug dealing, but Keith shows him some drug counselling cards he has been handing out. Keith threatens to phone the police, but Lucy talks him out of it and Lucy agrees to let Keith stay so he can get to know Hope. On the day he is due to leave for the Army, Johnny goes to see his mum, but he finds her with a massive bruise on her face. Johnny gets his mother out of the house and confronts Keith.

=== Kelly Bellman ===
Kelly Bellman
- The Dumping Ground character
- Portrayed by: Sandy Foster
- Duration: 2015–2017
- First appearance: "Free to Good Home"; 13 October 2015
- Last appearance: "Back in the Game"; 20 January 2017
- Introduced by: Lis Steele
In-universe information
- Spouse: Kev
- Sons: Dexter Bellman; Murphy Bellman
- Daughters: Sasha Bellman; Unknown
- Stepsons: Roddy

Kelly Bellman, portrayed by Sandy Foster, made her first appearance on 13 October 2015 in series 3 of The Dumping Ground during the episode "free to Good Home".

After catching Dexter (Alexander Aze) trying to shoplift, Sasha (Annabelle Davis) goes home and finds Murphy (Thomas and Oliver Waldram) alone. When Kelly returns home, she tells Sasha that she has had a call from a social worker about Sasha running away but says she will not report seeing her. Sasha tells her mum that she caught Dexter trying to shoplift some nappies and that she needs to be there for her brothers. When Kelly hints that she has no money, Sasha tells her that she cannot help her anymore.

When Sasha comes home after going to the park with Dexter and his friend, Kelly tells Sasha she is managing with Dexter and Murphy (Fred Montgomery Scott), but having her back would be a risk. Sasha is delighted when Kelly announces she is pregnant with her new partner's daughter, but is left upset when Kelly says it would not work with Sasha living at home. Kelly's daughter is born with dwarfism, like Sasha. When Sasha discovers her stepbrother, Roddy (Alfie Browne-Sykes), is involving Dexter in burglaries, she finds Dexter in a building containing stolen goods and discovers that Kelly is involved. Dexter moves back with Kelly and Kev, but Sasha chooses to remain at The Dumping Ground.

=== Peter and Janet Umbleby ===
Peter and Janet Umbleby
- The Dumping Ground character
- Portrayed by: Simon Ludders (Peter); Alison Pargeter (Janet)
- Duration: 2017
- First appearance: "Miscreants, Robots and Bullies"; 20 January 2017
- Last appearance: "What Lies Beneath"; 15 December 2017
- Introduced by: Johnathan Phillips
In-universe information
- Sons: Edward Umbleby

Peter Umbleby, portrayed by Simon Ludders, and Janet Umbleby, played by Alison Pargeter, made their first appearance on 20 January 2017 in series 5 of The Dumping Ground during the episode "Miscreants, Robots and Bullies".

Peter and Janet are the parents of Edward (Jaimie Boubezari), and Peter is a snobby, arrogant and overbearing man. The young people are mistaken for Mike Milligan and May-Li Wang's children, but they explain to the Umblebys that they live in a children's home. Floss Guppy (Sarah Rayson) tells Peter and Janet about the young people's lives and the Umblebys tell them to leave. Edward helps Kazima Tako (Akuc Bol), Toni Trent (Nelly Currant) and Billie Trent (Gwen Currant) leave his house when they return a doll and when Archie Able (Jethro Beliba) and Joseph Stubbs (Yousef Naseer) are caught in the garden and accused of trespassing, Edward blames Kazima, Toni and Billie. Edward crashes his drone into Kazima's cake and Edward has to help Kazima bake another one. She decides to help Edward stand up to his father and Mr Umbleby is annoyed with Edward spending time with Kazima and playing his guitar. Kazima offers to stay away from Edward if his parents return his guitar and Edward gets his guitar back. Ryan (Lewis Hamilton) and Dexter (Alexander Aze) spot Peter in the park putting a notice about a public meeting to close the skate park and Chloe (Hannah Moncur) suggests they go to the meeting about the skate park. At the meeting, Mr Umbleby undermines the young people and the other young people start hitting pots and pans, but Chloe stops them and explains what the skate park means to them.

Mike comes across a letter from a development firm in the garden and everyone is horrified to learn that they are planning to knock The Dumping Ground down and build flats. After a visit to the council, Mike and Tyler (Miles Butler-Houghton) tell everyone the decision to close the Dumping Ground was financially motivated. When there is a visit by the mayor, Ryan borrows Mike's MBE to help keep The Dumping Ground open, but Alex (Connor Lawson) eggs the Mayor and Peter. The Dumping Ground appears on the news and Mike is horrified that Peter is head of building planning and Janet exaggerates the young people's behaviour. Peter later reveals that the sale has been brought forward to the following day due to the management of The Dumping Ground. Elektra (Jessica Revell) returns to The Dumping Ground and greets everyone before sarcastically insulting the Umblebys. The Umblebys receive an email about the sale being put on hold due to the reports of Roman remains on the site, which the young people, Mike and May-Li are delighted about. Peter comes across Frank (Chris Slater) at the council whilst trying to find the boss, but Frank tells him his boss is away and is working on the site report. Elektra emerges when Peter leaves, impressed with how things are going. Alex overhears Peter and Janet discussing their own hired archaeological expert, who he will bribe with money to get his own way. Frank and Tyler look into Peter's plans when their archaeological plan fails and realise that Peter and Janet will gain a luxury house as part of the development. Janet returns the stolen money to Tyler and the theft was arranged by Peter. Janet tells Tyler that she wants to remain where she is and Tyler asks Frank to investigate. Mike tricks Peter inside and the young people tell him they know he is getting a new house and Peter gives in.

=== Aileen Peters ===
Aileen Peter
- The Dumping Ground character
- Portrayed by: Dani Arlington
- Duration: 2018–2019
- First appearance: "Cat's in the Cradle"; 16 February 2018
- Last appearance: "The Lone Ranger"; 11 January 2019
- Introduced by: Johnathan Phillips
In-universe information
- Sons: Alex Walker
- Daughters: Alice Peters

Aileen Peters, portrayed by Dani Arlington, made her first appearance on 16 February 2018 in series 6 of The Dumping Ground during the episode "Cat's in the Cradle".

Aileen is the mother of Alex Walker. When Alex is five, she has no job and struggles to feed herself and her son. She leaves him outside his father's workplace and drives away. She later finds work in business and becomes successful, winning a "Business Woman of the Year" award. While building her career, she marries and has a daughter, Alice. She spends years trying to find Alex, but repeatedly learns that he has moved elsewhere. She does not know that he ran away from care and was living on the streets by the age of twelve.

=== Alice Peters ===
Alice Peters
- The Dumping Ground character
- Portrayed by: Isla McMonigle
- Duration: 2018–2019
- First appearance: "Cat's in the Cradle"; 16 February 2018
- Last appearance: "The Lone Ranger"; 11 January 2019
- Introduced by: Johnathan Phillips
In-universe information
- Mother: Aileen Peters
- Brothers: Alex Walker

Alice Peters, portrayed by Isla McMonigle, made her first appearance on 16 February 2018 in series 6, episode 6 of The Dumping Ground during the episode "Cat's in the Cradle".

Alice is the half-sister of Alex Walker.

=== Fiona Johnson ===
Fiona Johnson
- The Dumping Ground character
- Portrayed by: Michelle Collins
- Duration: 2018
- First appearance: "Challenging Times"; 23 February 2018
- Last appearance: "Missing Presumed Single"; 7 December 2018
- Introduced by: Johnathan Phillips
In-universe information
- Husband: Mike Milligan

Fiona Johnson, portrayed by Michelle Collins, made her first appearance on 23 February 2018 in series 6 of The Dumping Ground during the episode "Challenging Times".

Fiona is the wife of Mike Milligan. They dated as young adults, but she ended the relationship after a few months because she wanted something different. They meet again years later when her care home, Graybridge, competes against Ashdene Ridge for a trip to London. Seeing her brings back Mike's feelings for her and his distress at their separation. In "Two Sides to Every Story", Fiona returns to film a video with Mike for Sasha about the competition. Candi-Rose notices their attraction and tries to reunite them. They agree to meet for coffee. By "The Lurgy", when an ill Mike repeatedly phones Fiona to ask her to collect things from the chemist, they are in a relationship again.

Mike proposed to Fiona off-screen during the 19th episode of series 6, "Jay and Bird's Day" and she accepted.

Fiona and Mike got married in the 24th episode of series 6, "Missing Presumed Single". Fiona does not invite her friends or family to the wedding; the reason is not explained.

=== Henry Lawrence ===
Henry Lawrence
- The Dumping Ground character
- Portrayed by: Louis Mahoney
- Duration: 2018
- First appearance: "Home"; 5 October 2018
- Last appearance: "Missing Presumed Single" (voice); 7 December 2018
- Introduced by: Johnathan Phillips
In-universe information
- Daughters: Melanie
- Granddaughters: Charlie Morris

Henry Lawrence, portrayed by Louis Mahoney, made his first appearance on 5 October 2018 in series 6 of The Dumping Ground during the episode "Home".

Henry is Charlie Morris's grandfather. His death is mentioned in "Missing Presumed Single".

=== Ross Maydons ===
Ross Maydons
- The Dumping Ground character
- Portrayed by: William Talbot
- Duration: 2018–2023
- First appearance: "Home"; 5 October 2018
- Last appearance: "Life Is What You Bake It"; 9 June 2023
- Introduced by: Johnathan Phillips
In-universe information
- Mother: Jen
- Sisters: Floss Guppy
- Half-sisters: Fee

Ross Maydons, portrayed by William Talbot, made his first appearance on 5 October 2018 in series 6 of The Dumping Ground during the episode "Home". He made his second appearance in series 7 during the episode "The Return of the Freaky Twins". In "Nobody's Perfect", it was revealed from a DNA test that Ross is Floss' brother. His relationship to his half-sister, Fee, is not discussed in the episode.

== Others ==
=== Series 1 (2013) ===
Character	Date(s)	Actor	Circumstances
Bomb Squad Officer	4 January 2013	Craig Conway	Gina (Kay Purcell) is hit by a grenade and taken to hospital. The Bomb Squad Officer mistakes Faith (Leanne Dunstan) for a care worker and he tells the young people off for playing with a grenade. When a grenade is thrown into the attic, the Bomb Squad Officer is called out again and Faith is shocked when he has to blow up the grenade, thinking it will be a big explosion.
Lydia Dillon	4 January 2013	Jacqueline Phillips	Lydia is a relief care worker to fill in for Mike Milligan (Connor Byrne) when he is on holiday. The young people do not like Lydia's strict attitude, so Faith (Leanne Dunstan) pretends to be the relief care worker so she leaves.
Manager	4 January 2013	Tony Neilson	When Frank (Chris Slater) and Tyler (Miles Butler-Houghton) are sent out to do the food shop, they stop off at an arcade. Frank uses all the food money on the machines and when Frank wins, he asks the manager why no money has come out of the machine. The manager says he needs them to prove they are 18 before he can give them the money.
Sarah	4 January 2013	Sammy T. Dobson	Elektra (Jessica Revell) believes Mike (Connor Byrne) is going to chuck her out when she sees an e-mail about her from social services. She decides to apply to be on the "Are you a young leader of tomorrow?" programme so she can go to Australia. Elektra fakes an application, where she has lied about several achievements. Sarah visits The Dumping Ground and she is impressed with Elektra, but she breaks the news that Elektra is ineligible for the programme as it is designed for those who need to make a positive change. An angry Elektra reveals the truth about herself and that Faith is not a social worker.
Ronnie	25 January 2013	Elizabeth Hall	Ronnie and Dawn are potential foster parents for Gus (Noah Marullo). When Mike (Connor Byrne) tells Gus about seeing potential foster parents, Gus refuses to see them as he does not want to be fostered, but Tyler (Miles Butler-Houghton) expresses an interest in meeting them. Johnny (Joe Maw) discovers that Dawn and Ronnie are both women when they turn up and when everyone finds out, they are all divided on opinions on whether gay couples should be allowed to foster. Gus goes to Ronnie and Dawn's house with Mike and he asks them questions about how they do things. Gus decides to be fostered by Ronnie and Dawn and they collect him from The Dumping Ground.
Dawn	25 January 2013	Sara Stephens	
Social Worker	1 February 2013	Katharine Monaghan	A social worker and a police officer visit The Dumping Ground to tell Faith (Leanne Dunstan) that a body has been found, which they believe may be that of her brother Razz (Isaac Ssenbandeke). They need a DNA sample from her to confirm its identity. It is later concluded it is not her brother.
Police Officer	1 February 2013	Ian Stewart Robinson	A social worker and a police officer visit The Dumping Ground to tell Faith (Leanne Dunstan) that a body has been found, which they believe may be that of her brother Razz (Isaac Ssenbandeke). They need a DNA sample from her to confirm its identity. It is later concluded it is not her brother.
Jade	8 February 2013 – 15 February 2013	Adeleina Williams	When Frank (Chris Slater) gets a D for Sports Science, he stops at a cafe that is advertising a job. Jade tells Frank that he can have the job once she has spoken to her father. All the young people arrive at the cafe and they notice Frank has a crush on Jade. Frank later talks to Jade about his grandfather and Jade tells Frank her mother died when she was ten. Jade introduces Frank to Angel (Louise Jameson), a psychic medium, and Frank is impressed with Angel's gift when she knows stuff about Frank. She then talks to Jade's mother. When Angel talks to Faith's (Leanne Dunstan) brother, Angel accepts false statements Faith makes about herself until Faith reveals that she invented them. Jade returns a charm that Frank bought her. Jade visits The Dumping Ground and makes up with Frank. Jade kisses Frank, which is witnessed by the other children.
Angel	8 February 2013	Louise Jameson	Jade (Adeleina Williams) introduces Frank (Chris Slater) to Angel, a psychic medium. Frank is impressed with Angel's gift when she knows stuff about Frank. She then talks to Jade's mother. Frank tells the other residents about Angel, but Faith (Leanne Dunstan) does not believe in her, so she goes to the cafe to see Angel. The following day, Angel contacts Faith's brother for her; however, Faith tells Angel false things about herself, which Angel accepts as true. Faith then reveals to Angel none of it was true and that she is a fake.
Gerry	15 February 2013	Chris Simmons	Gerry is the father of Rick (Daniel Pearson). He pretends to be a boiler inspector to get inside The Dumping Ground and Rick is shocked to find his father at The Dumping Ground. Rick meets up with his father, followed by Tyler (Miles Butler-Houghton), and when Rick says he has to hand himself in to the police, Gerry explains he is now at an open prison. Gerry apologises to Rick and promises him once he is out of prison, he will put his old life behind him. After witnessing Tyler getting hassle from a builder (Ryan Enever), Gerry decides to pull a scam with Tyler by getting Tyler to wind up the builder whilst he takes money from his pocket. Later, Gerry is about to give Tyler the money, but Rick tells him not to and Rick is disgusted with his father. Gerry goes to The Dumping Ground to talk to Rick and Gerry tries to persuade Rick to move to New Zealand with him when he leaves prison.
Builder	15 February 2013	Ryan Enver	Tyler (Miles Butler-Houghton) gets hassle from the builder when he accuses Tyler of stealing from his van, when Tyler was only spying on Rick (Daniel Pearson) with his father, Gerry (Chris Simmons). Gerry decides to pull a scam with Tyler by getting Tyler to wind up the builder whilst he takes money from his pocket. Later, Gerry is about to give Tyler the money, but Rick tells him not to and Rick is disgusted with his father. Gerry goes to The Dumping Ground to talk to Rick and Gerry tries to persuade Rick to move to New Zealand with him when he leaves prison.
Hattie	15 February 2013	Carmen Munroe	Hattie is the mother of Gina (Kay Purcell). Gina is forced to bring Hattie to The Dumping Ground when Hattie's carer is sick. Hattie gets on well with Tee (Mia McKenna-Bruce), although she is forgetful and when Tee tells Hattie her name, Hattie thinks Tee is offering a cup of tea. Floss (Sarah Rayson) startles the young people when she believes Hattie is dead; however, when they check on Hattie, she wakes up and gives them a scare. Gina gives Faith (Leanne Dunstan) a shopping list for some curry ingredients and Hattie mistakes Faith for Gina. Later, Tee finds that Hattie has gone, so Gina, Faith and Tee go looking for her. They find her at the bus stop, but she cannot remember Tee and Faith pretends to be Gina to calm Hattie down. Gina, Tee and Faith return her to The Dumping Ground. Gina realises that Hattie would be better off in a care home.
George	22 February 2013	Philip Harrison	George is the owner of Hidden Hall. George tells the young people they are going to pick names out of a hat to determine who they are going to pretend to be. Once the young people have been assigned a person, he gives them their tasks and Carmen (Amy-Leigh Hickman) is not pleased about being a scullery maid. Elektra (Jessica Revell) shows little interest in the day and she annoys George when she relaxes in a room that is out of bounds. When Lily (Jessie Williams) and Tee (Mia McKenna-Bruce) dance with Johnny (Joe Maw), who is acting as an Earl, and Harry (Philip Graham Scott), who is acting as the Earl's son, reality and fiction clash when Johnny rubbishes Lily's father and George and Mike (Connor Byrne) break up their fight. At lunch, Johnny is in a bad mood and decides that no one is allowed to eat and a food fight breaks out. George orders them to go when a valuable photo is ruined.
Rachel	22 February 2013	Rachel Teate	Rachel is an employee at Hidden Hall, who teaches Lily (Jessie Williams), Tee (Mia McKenna-Bruce) and Floss (Sarah Rayson) about Edwardian etiquette as they are pretending to be Edwardian ladies. She teaches them how to use hand fans and how to do the Grizzly Bear dance.
Esme	15 March 2013	Sophie Skelton	Carmen (Amy-Leigh Hickman) and Lily (Jessie Williams) meet Esme in a clothes shop and when Esme is mugged, they invite her back to The Dumping Ground. When Esme is introduced to the others by Carmen and Lily, Johnny (Joe Maw) is attracted to her. Most of the young people dislike Esme because of her influence on Carmen. Lily overhears Carmen dismiss her ambitions as ordinary and tell Esme that they plan to run away to Brazil. Carmen leaves The Dumping Ground the following morning, but when she arrives at Esme's, Carmen is annoyed to discover that Esme has told her mother, Mrs Vasquez-Jones (Selina Giles) lies about her.
Mrs Vasquez-Jones	15 March 2013	Selina Giles	
Razz	15 March 2013	Isaac Ssenbandeke	Razz is the older brother of Faith (Leanne Dunstan). He tracks down Faith, but Faith is angry with him as she thought he was dead. Razz is being chased by Solly (Robert Haythorne) and Cass (Lee Lomas) because he has left their gang and taken some money. Faith agrees to help him. Faith smuggles him into The Dumping Ground and Razz shows Faith the cash and he wants them to start over again. Faith realises he left GPS on on his mobile, which is why Solly and Cass know he is at The Dumping Ground. Razz later claims that the money has been stolen and suspects Frank (Chris Slater) took it. Solly and Cass come looking for Razz inside The Dumping Ground. Solly and Cass want their money back and Razz tells them he has not got it, hinting that Frank has taken it, however it turns out Razz had it all along. Faith is disgusted that Razz lied and tried to blame one of her friends, but she makes up with Razz when he deals with a snake that gets rid of Solly and Cass.
Solly	15 March 2013	Robert Haythorne	Solly and Cass are after Razz (Isaac Ssenbandeke) as Razz quit their gang and took some of their money. They find Razz at The Dumping Ground as he left GPS on on his mobile. Solly and Cass warn Razz that they are outside The Dumping Ground. When Frank (Chris Slater) goes out, he is intercepted by Solly and Cass, who order him to get Razz. Frank tries to get rid of Solly and Cass, but they do not fall for his excuses and they go inside The Dumping Ground to look for Razz. Solly and Cass want their money back and Razz tells them he has not got it, hinting that Frank has taken it; however, it turns out Razz had it all along. Solly and Cass are scared out of The Dumping Ground by a snake.
Cass	15 March 2013	Lee Lomas	

=== Series 2 (2014) ===
Character	Date(s)	Actor	Circumstances
Serjay	10 January 2014	Danny Ashok	Serjay is a social worker, who brings Bailey (Kasey McKellar) to The Dumping Ground. Serjay tells May-Li (Stacy Liu) that Bailey will have to stay at The Dumping Ground longer and when Serjay tries to pass the responsibility of telling Bailey to May-Li and Mike (Connor Byrne), May-Li firmly insists that he tells Bailey.
Doctor	10 January 2014	Gauri Vedhara	Faith (Leanne Dunstan) is knocked over by a car when Bailey (Kasey McKellar) runs away from The Dumping Ground to get to his football match. The doctor tells Faith and Mike (Connor Byrne) that the x-ray has shown no damage to her hip. When Faith asks when she can start training again, the doctor advises her to give it a couple of weeks and ease into it.
Daryl	10 January 2014	Finn Armstrong	Daryl is a teammate of Bailey (Kasey McKellar). After Bailey runs away from The Dumping Ground, Jody (Kia Pegg) and Carmen (Amy-Leigh Hickman) go to see if Bailey is playing football. Daryl tells Jody and Carmen that Bailey is no longer on the team because he missed training.
Police Officer	10 January 2014	Jon Regan	Jimmy (Mark Theodore) is ejected from the match by the police officer. To avoid getting into trouble when Jody (Kia Pegg) mentions to the police officer that Jimmy abducted his child, Jimmy lies that he does not have a child, hurting Bailey (Kasey McKellar).
Sasha	17 January 2014	Angela Griffin	Sasha is a filmmaker who comes to Ashdene Ridge to make a training video for social workers. Jody (Kia Pegg) does not want to be a part of the film as she believes everyone is acting strangely and it is fake. Sasha allows Jody to make the movie, but Jody finds it difficult when some of the others refuse to cooperate. Mo (Reece Buttery) gathers some fly-on-the-wall footage of Jody to show Sasha.
Police Officer	24 January 2014	Asif Khan	After learning Lily (Jessie Williams) is moving, Carmen (Amy-Leigh Hickman) takes it badly and smashes a window with a football. After Bailey (Kasey McKellar) is arrested, Floss (Sarah Rayson) tells Carmen that she saw her smash the window and Carmen gives her the bracelet Lily gave her as a present. When Lily notices Floss has the bracelet, Lily confronts Carmen and Carmen admits she broke the window. She then admits the truth to Mike (Connor Byrne) and May Li (Stacy Liu) and she goes to the police with a reluctant Mike, confessing to smashing the window. The custody sergeant tells Carmen her rights now she is in custody and takes her fingerprints. The custody sergeant mentions he has two daughters when talking to Mike.
Custody Sergeant	24 January 2014	Dale Meeks	
Danny	31 January 2014	George Sampson	When Faith (Leanne Dunstan), Carmen (Amy-Leigh Hickman) and Rick (Daniel Pearson) go to see Frank (Chris Slater) at his place, Frank is not in. When they leave, Danny approaches them and asks if they know Frank before warning them that if they see him, tell him that he wants his money. Frank repays Danny his money and Frank wants to have a game of cards again to win money. When Frank has five aces, Danny accuses Jen of helping Frank cheat and demands that she return the money. When Danny says it is not enough, Frank decides to sell his pocket watch again and when he goes, it is revealed Jen is in on the plan with Danny. To get their own back on Danny and Jen, the children hatch a plan to pretend Faith left a piece of expensive jewellery behind. Faith and Rick tell Danny and Jen that Frank is looking after a ring, which Faith claims is her mother's engagement ring. Later at the flat with Kazima (Akuc Bol), Frank plans to give Danny the watch, but when Frank has the ring, Danny demands to have the ring in exchange for all the money he has taken from Frank.
Jen	31 January 2014	Georgina Campbell	
Shopkeeper	31 January 2014	Alan Renwick	When looking for Frank (Chris Slater), Rick (Daniel Pearson), Bailey (Kasey McKellar), Tee (Mia McKenna-Bruce) and Carmen (Amy-Leigh Hickman) find Frank's pocket watch for sale in a window. They ask the shopkeeper if they can save the watch for them, but he tells them that he has had interest from another customer. Kazima (Akuc Bol) later comes to buy the watch from the shopkeeper.
Community Support Officer	7 February 2014	Shareesa Valentine	On a day out with Tyler (Miles Butler-Houghton), Tyler's mother, Sally (Diveen Henry), gets some ice cream; however, she has no money to pay, so she runs away without paying. The community support officer intercepts Sally. May-Li (Stacy Liu) eventually finds Sally and Tyler and she pays for the ice cream.
Mr Jenkins	28 February 2014	Darren Morfitt	Mr Jenkins is a football coach. After a match, he pulls Bailey (Kasey McKellar) aside and criticises him for letting the opposing team score more goals and when Bailey asks what his problem is, Mr Jenkins is racist towards Bailey. Bailey keeps quiet about what Mr Jenkins told him, but Faith (Leanne Dunstan) gets the truth out of Bailey and they report the incident to Mike (Connor Byrne). Mike goes down to the pitch and confronts Mr Jenkins about what he said.
Justin	28 February 2014	Mackenzie Sol Williams	Justin is a teammate of Bailey (Kasey McKellar). When Justin makes a racist remark, Bailey physically attacks Justin.
Viv Anderson	28 February 2014	Himself	Viv Anderson oversees football training with Mr Jenkins (Darren Morfitt). Bailey (Kasey McKellar) starts playing with a football during Mr Jenkins' talk and Viv tells Mike (Connor Byrne) that Bailey needs to learn manners. When Bailey later tells Mike that Mr Jenkins was racist to him, Mike goes down to the pitch and confronts Mr Jenkins, which is witnessed by Viv. Viv visits The Dumping Ground and encourages Bailey not to quit due to racism as he went through it and Viv arranges to see Bailey play football again. May-Li (Stacy Liu) is starstruck when she sees Viv and he gives her his football shirt.
Nicky Richardson	7 March 2014	Lu Corfield	When someone attempts to rob Nicky outside The Dumping Ground, Johnny Taylor (Joe Maw) takes a photo of the person who attempted to take her bag. Johnny tells Nicky that he managed to get a photo and Nicky thanks him before handing him a card with her contact details and Johnny realises she is in the army. Johnny decides to see Nicky about joining the army. When Johnny fails at a teamwork task, he goes to see Nicky, who tells him that he is not a quitter as he persevered.
Doug	14 March 2014	Michael Hodgson	Doug and Nerys are potential adoptive parents for Floss (Sarah Rayson). Floss believes she will continue living at The Dumping Ground, but Harry (Philip Graham Scott) tells Floss what adoption really means. When Floss goes to the park with Nerys, Doug and May-Li (Stacy Liu), a boy named Jesse (Alex Humprey) upsets Floss when he presumes Floss does not have a mum, so Floss pushes him in retaliation. Floss brings Tee (Mia McKenna-Bruce) on a visit to Doug and Nerys' house. After making play dough, Nerys cleans Floss's hands and tries to remove her nail varnish, but Floss knocks the flour on the floor and she then throws all the other play dough ingredients out of the dishes. Floss decides that she does not want to be adopted by Doug and Nerys.
Nerys	14 March 2014	Lucy Speed	
Neil	14 March 2014	John Bowley	Neil is the ex-boyfriend of Carmen (Amy-Leigh Hickman). Carmen breaks up with Neil after their date.
Jesse's Mum	14 March 2014	Claire Sundin	When Floss (Sarah Rayson) goes to the park with Nerys (Lucy Speed), Doug (Michael Hodgson) and May-Li (Stacy Liu), Jesse (Alex Humprey) upsets Floss when he presumes Floss does not have a mum, so Floss pushes Jesse in retaliation.
Jesse	14 March 2014	Alex Humprey	When Floss (Sarah Rayson) goes to the park with Nerys (Lucy Speed), Doug (Michael Hodgson) and May-Li (Stacy Liu), Jesse (Alex Humprey) upsets Floss when he presumes Floss does not have a mum, so Floss pushes Jesse in retaliation.
Hope Taylor	21 March 2014, 13 March 2015	Lucy Briggs (2014); Holly and Paige Robinson (2015)	Hope is the daughter of Keith (Neil Morrissey) and Lucy (Sally Rogers) as well as the younger half-sister of Johnny (Joe Maw) and Tee (Mia McKenna-Bruce). Feeling that Hope is not safe with Lucy, Tee takes Hope whilst Lucy is distracted and takes her to The Dumping Ground before pretending to Mike (Connor Byrne) she is an abandoned child. A frantic Lucy turns up at The Dumping Ground to collect Hope and Mike realises that Hope is Johnny and Tee's sister.
Sian da Silva	28 March 2014	Gabrielle Glaister	Sian is a council representative. When Frank (Chris Slater) is sacked from his job after a short period of time, he goes to apologise to Sian and asks if she can get Faith (Leanne Dunstan) her job back, but she refuses. Harry (Philip Graham Scott) and Floss (Sarah Rayson) go to the town hall with Frank to invite Sian to The Dumping Ground for lunch, but she declines, even when they mention that Mike (Connor Byrne) will be there. Sian comes to lunch and Mike asks Sian to go for dinner with him and Sian accepts.
Manager	28 March 2014	John Sumner	The manager of a leisure centre, where Frank (Chris Slater) gets a job and where Faith (Leanne Dunstan) does her work placement. When Frank spots Liam (Richard Wisker), Frank starts physically attacking Liam and Faith tries to stop Frank. Frank and Faith are both sacked by the manager.

=== Series 3 (2015) ===
Character	Date(s)	Actor	Circumstances
Police Officer	16 January 2015	Amer Nazir	At the end of a fostering information day, guests discover that their purses and wallets have been taken. The police officer questions who had access to them and if anyone left early. Stephanie (Charlie Brooks) accuses Sally (Diveen Henry). Johnny (Joe Maw) is questioned by the police officer when a wallet is found in the bathroom in his room, handed in by Bailey (Kasey McKellar).
Stephanie Branston	16 January 2015	Charlie Brooks	Stephanie and Matt Branston attend the fostering information day. Bailey (Kasey McKellar) and Carmen (Amy-Leigh Hickman) both try and impress Stephanie and Matt so that they will foster either of them. Bailey confronts Stephanie and Matt about them being accused of racism, so Bailey suggests if they foster him, it will prove to people they are not racist. When the bath overflows, water leaks through the ceiling, soaking Stephanie, Matt and Carmen and when Stephanie calls the children rejects, Carmen realises that she does not want to be fostered by Stephanie and Matt. When the guests are about to leave, they find that their purses and wallets have been taken and Stephanie believes Sally (Diveeen Henry) is responsible.
Matt Branston	16 January 2015	Stuart Manning	
Mr Gordon	16 January 2015	Grant Burgin	Mr and Mrs Gordon attend the fostering information day with their daughter, Maude (Kiki Truman-Brooks). He and his wife take to Harry (Philip Graham Scott) and they decide they want Harry to have a home visit. When the wallets and purses are taken, suspects include Tyler's (Miles Butler-Houghton) mum, Sally (Diveen Henry) and Johnny (Joe Maw). New boy Ryan (Lewis Hamilton) works out Maude was responsible and Maude owns up and apologises to her parents. Mike (Connor Byrne) tells the Gordons that it may not be the right time for fostering.
Mrs Gordon	16 January 2015	Tonya French	
Maude Gordon	16 January 2015	Kiki Brooks-Truman	Maude attends the fostering information day with her parents and her parents take to Harry (Philip Graham Scott). When the wallets and purses are taken, suspects include Tyler's (Miles Butler-Houghton) mum, Sally (Diveen Henry) and Johnny (Joe Maw). New boy Ryan (Lewis Hamilton) works out Maude was responsible and Maude owns up and apologises to her parents.
Mrs Underwood	16 January 2015	Martina Laird	Mrs Underwood attends the fostering information day and she meets Tyler (Miles Butler-Houghton). Tyler tells Mrs Underwood that he cannot get fostered as he has promised his mother, Sally (Diveen Henry). Mrs Underwood and Tyler later scare Mike (Connor Byrne) and Mrs Underwood mentions to Tyler that if he did get fostered, it would not change the contact he would have with his mother. When Tyler wonders if his mum cares, Mrs Underwood comforts Tyler, Sally arrives at that moment and is hurt to see this.
Mal	30 January 2015	Dai Bradley	Mal is a homeless man with whom Bailey (Kasey McKellar) argues over a football. Mal refuses to return it after Bailey insults him. As Bailey tries to retrieve the ball, Mal leans back too far and falls. Bailey takes the ball and runs away. The following day, he learns that Mal has died and fears that he caused his death. He takes responsibility for Mal's dog, Mischief (Sage), to make amends. It is later revealed that Mal's death was not Bailey's fault.
Clive	30 January 2015	Avin Shah	Clive is a homeless man. When Mal (Dai Bradley) dies, Clive asks Bailey (Kasey McKellar) if he wants Mal's dog, Mischief (Sage). When Mischief needs an operation, the children sell soup to raise money for his operation and Clive gives them money, which was given by those who passed by.
Roscoe Hayden	6 February 2015	Simeon Zack	Roscoe is an artist friend of Kazima (Akuc Bol) and Kazima takes Tee (Mia McKenna-Bruce) to meet him to get inspiration for her art. Roscoe encourages Tee to help him do street art before showing Tee the rest of his art. Roscoe tells Tee about his family and how his mum suddenly left and that he is estranged from his father. Roscoe and Tee then do some more art on a car park wall, but a security guard (Christopher Connel) catches them, but Roscoe runs away. Tee returns to the car park, asking for Roscoe's father to contact him.
Security Guard	6 February 2015	Christopher Connel	Roscoe (Simeon Zack) and Tee (Mia McKenna-Bruce) paint on a car park wall and the security guard catches them, but Roscoe runs away and he manages to stop Tee. He notices how young she is and lets her off.
Police Officer	13 February 2015	Sarah Lewis Obuba	Ryan (Lewis Hamilton) and Tyler (Miles Butler-Hughton) stage a burglary to get a new computer and so Tyler can buy magic tricks. The police officer asks Mike (Connor Byrne) and May-Li (Stacy Liu) where the children were and the police officer has to speak to Floss (Sarah Rayson) as she was the only one not with May-Li.
Dave	13 February 2015	Geff Francis	Dave (Geff Francis) Ryan (Lewis Hamilton) and Tyler (Miles Butler-Hughton) stage a burglary to get a new computer. They sell the computer to Dave and when Jody (Kia Pegg) discovers what Tyler and Ryan did, she takes them to the shop to retrieve it. They sit on the floor and refuse to move in protest when Dave will not give it back. They soon get the computer.
Adam Aycliffe	13 February 2015 – 6 March 2015	Ray Emmet Brown	Adam is the father of Claire (Isabelle Burrows-Brown) and the foster father of Harry (Philip Graham Scott) and Finn (Ruben Reuter). A text is sent to Ryan (Lewis Hamilton) saying "HELP!" and Ryan goes to Harry's foster home and Ryan notices Harry and Finn do not look excited about going out with Adam for their birthday. Ryan sneaks Finn and Harry out, running away with them to return to The Dumping Ground; however, Adam catches up with them in his car. Whilst Adam orders Harry and Finn back in the car, Ryan takes his car keys and chucks them into the field. When they reach The Dumping Ground, Harry pleads with Mike (Connor Byrne) not to return after encouragement from Ryan to speak up and Adam admits to Mike that he was in financial trouble and kept fostering to get money.
Sylvie	20 February 2015	Indra Ove	Carmen (Amy-Leigh Hickman) goes for an audition to present online videos. Carmen was recently given glasses, but she tries to read the autocue without glasses and Sylvie is not impressed with her audition. Carmen then wears her glasses and Sylvie changes her mind about Carmen. Sylvie decides to film Carmen's recall at the Dumping Ground with Dallas Campbell that afternoon.
Dallas Campbell	20 February 2015	Himself	Dallas Campbell goes to The Dumping Ground with Sylvie to film Carmen's (Amy-Leigh Hickman) recall.
Maz	27 February 2015	Natifa Mai	When Tee (Mia McKenna-Bruce) and Kazima (Akuc Bol) attend a fun day whilst the others go to a theme park, it turns out to be boring, so they decide to go home. Unknown to them, money was put in Kazima's bag by Max. Max and Maz follow Tee home and break into The Dumping Ground. Tee and Kazima realise that they put money in Kazima's bag, but due to the large amount of money, they refuse to hand it back and try to scare Maz and Max out of The Dumping Ground. Max ends up being locked in the attic whilst Maz is tricked into going in the kitchen where Tee and Kazima drop a net on her and tie her up. They are then arrested by the police.
Max	27 February 2015	Frankie Wilson	
Claire Aycliffe	6 March 2015	Isabelle Burrows-Brown	Claire is the daughter of Adam (Ray Emmet Brown) and Nina Aycliffe, and the foster (now ex) sister of Harry (Philip Graham Scott) and Finn (Ruben Reuter).
Keith Taylor	13 March 2015	Neil Morrissey	Keith Taylor is the boyfriend of Lucy (Sally Rogers), father of Hope (Holly and Paige Robinson) and the stepfather of Johnny (Joe Maw) and Tee (Mia McKenna-Bruce). Johnny spots Keith in a park and rushes to tell his mum, but he and Tee are shocked to learn that she knows and that he has been seeing Hope. When Johnny goes to see his mum, Keith answers the door and Lucy arrives home shortly after. Keith pretends to be friendly toward Johnny, inviting him in, but when Lucy goes in, Keith is horrid to Johnny. Johnny later follows Keith to the park and when Johnny notices Keith handing something to a group of youths, he suspects he is drug dealing and photographs him, but Keith spots him. Keith visits The Dumping Ground and complains to Mike (Connor Byrne) about Johnny, accusing him of harassment. When Johnny shows his mum the photos, Lucy thinks it is drug dealing, but Keith shows him some drug counselling cards he has been handing out. Keith threatens to phone the police, but Lucy talks him out of it and Lucy agrees to let Keith stay so he can get to know Hope. On the day he is due to leave for the Army, Johnny goes to see his mum, but he finds her with a massive bruise on her face. Johnny gets his mother out of the house and confronts Keith.
H&S Inspector	13 October 2015	Shameem Ahmed	A health and safety inspector, who arrives at The Dumping Ground to carry out a routine inspection. The children mistake her for the trampoline assessor and accidentally inform her of Finn's (Ruben Reuter) injury on an old trampoline. Dexter (Alexander Aze) throws rubbish over the health and safety inspector's car in order to be taken into care, but his family are given the support of social services.
Trampoline Assessor	13 October 2015	Angela Murray	After Finn (Ruben Reuter) injures himself on a trampoline, Toni (Nelly Currant), Billie (Gwen Currant), Finn, Mo (Reece Buttery) and Floss (Sarah Rayson) decide to enter a competition to win a trampoline. In order to win the trampoline, they decide to pretend Billie is an outstanding trampolinist. She arrives at The Dumping Ground to assess Billie, but Mike (Connor Byrne) apologises to her for the children making up what they said.
Abi	20 October 2015	Kemi-Bo Jacobs	Abi is Bailey's (Kasey McKellar) reviewing officer. Bailey is promised football tickets by Abi if he passes his review and fearing he will fail, Bailey tampers with the paperwork May-Li (Stacy Liu) has prepared about him, but she catches him. In her meeting to discuss Bailey's progress at The Dumping Ground, Abi is impressed with Bailey's commitment to Mischief (Sage). May-Li stops Abi giving Bailey the football tickets by reporting the incident prior to the meeting and Bailey storms out. Bailey takes the tickets from Abi's bag when she leaves it unsupervised, but Abi later notices and reports it to Mike (Connor Byrne). Knowing Bailey would have taken the tickets, Jody (Kia Pegg) tracks Bailey down at the coach station and Bailey returns the tickets to Abi, telling her he does not want any more bribes to behave. Abi volunteers Bailey to work at the local dog pound.
Laces	27 October 2015	Quinton Nyirenda	After Ryan (Lewis Hamilton) deletes a text from Johnny (Joe Maw) to Tee (Mia McKenna-Bruce) cancelling his visit, Tee is annoyed when no one believes her. She and Sasha (Annabelle Davis) go to Ryan's former care home and encounter Laces, so Tee asks if he knows Ryan. Laces explains to Tee and Sasha how Ryan used to steal the other children's birthday presents. Planning to expose Ryan for who he really is and knowing that Ryan hates celebrating his own birthday, Tee plans a birthday party for Ryan. After Ryan apologises to Tee and is OK with the party, Tee decides she cannot go through with the plan and tells Laces to go. Laces refuses and interrupts Ryan's party, telling everyone the truth about Ryan.
David Michaels	3 November 2015	Simon Rouse	David is the grandfather of Mo (Reece Buttery), although Mo believes that his grandparents are his parents. Mo learns that David's son, Peter (Colin Young) and Caroline (Donna Lavin) are his parents at the hospital when David is rushed to hospital after a heart attack. Mo is upset by this and is angry at Mike (Connor Byrne) for keeping it from him. Mo visits David at the hospital when he is awake and Mo reveals to David that he knows Caroline and Peter are his parents. David explains the reasons why he had Mo removed from his parents, which is that he found Mo left alone in Peter and Caroline's flat at 18 months old. Mo thinks that David is embarrassed by Peter and Caroline as they have cerebral palsy and Mo decides he wants to get to know Caroline and Peter, but David tells Mo that they cannot look after him. At the hospital, Mo decides to fix things between David, Peter and Caroline by bringing them together and encouraging them to talk. When they refuse, Mo gives them the ultimatum that if they do not talk and work things out, then he does not want them to see him in his school play. On the night of Mo's school play, David turns up and Mo is disappointed when he thinks his parents are not going to show up; however, Peter and Caroline arrive and Mo arranges for them to watch the play from backstage.
Peter Michaels	3 November 2015	Colin Young	Caroline and Peter are the parents of Mo (Reece Buttery), although Mo believes his grandfather David (Simon Rouse) and grandmother are his parents. They both have cerebral palsy. Mo discovers that Caroline and Peter are his parents at the hospital when David is rushed to hospital after a heart attack. Mo is upset about finding out and is angry at Mike (Connor Byrne) for keeping it from him. Caroline and Peter visit Mo at The Dumping Ground, where they explain to Mo that they did not have a choice about giving him up as David phoned the social services as David thought they could not cope and that his grandparents then adopted him. Mo ends up snapping at Caroline and Peter when they tell Mo that David was not very nice. Mo visits his parents and he realises he has much in common with Caroline and Peter. On another visit to his parents, things go well for Mo until his father accidentally burns himself with a hot dish. At the hospital, Mo decides to fix things between David, Peter and Caroline by bringing them together and encouraging them to talk. When they refuse, Mo gives them the ultimatum that if they do not talk and work things out, then he does not want them to see him in his school play. On the night of Mo's school play, David turns up and Mo is disappointed when he thinks his parents are not going to show up; however, Peter and Caroline arrive and Mo arranges for them to watch the play from backstage.
Caroline Michaels	3 November 2015	Donna Lavin	
Chanelle	10 November 2015	Imogen Faires	Tyler (Miles Butler-Houghton) runs into a magic shop, owned by Chanelle's father Andy (Ashley Artus), when Tyler is chased by a group of boys. Chanelle gives Tyler some magic tricks for free. Tyler later thanks Chanelle with flowers and chocolates, but leaves the gifts with Andy; however, he throws them away. Chanelle thanks Tyler for his gifts after she found them and she helps Tyler construct his magic crate to help him with his disappearing trick. When they test it out, Tyler takes his stress out on Chanelle when the crate will not work and she leaves. Carmen (Amy-Leigh Hickman) and Jody (Kia Pegg) go to the magic shop to see Chanelle after a text was sent on Chanelle's phone to Tyler saying that she hates him, so Jody distracts Andy. When Tyler is going to perform his magic show, Chanelle breaks the news to Tyler that she is moving to Ireland as her father sold the shop, which is the reason her father did not want them to be together and Tyler is devastated. However, Tyler and Chanelle go through with the show and Chanelle takes part in the disappearing trick.
Andy	10 November 2015	Ashley Artus	Andy is the father of Chanelle (Imogen Faires). After Chanelle helps Tyler (Miles Butler-Houghton), he goes to thank Chanelle with flowers and chocolates. Andy takes a message for Chanelle and Tyler leaves the gifts with Andy, but he throws them away. Andy visits The Dumping Ground to tell Mike (Connor Byrne) that he feels Tyler is taking advantage of Chanelle and that Chanelle is in a rough place after her mother's death. Mike promises to keep an eye on Chanelle and Tyler, but Andy is not satisfied. Carmen (Amy-Leigh Hickman) and Jody (Kia Pegg) go to the magic shop to see Chanelle after a text was sent on Chanelle's phone to Tyler saying that she hates him, so Jody distracts Andy.
Plumber/Fireman	17 November 2015	Sam Cassidy	When Carmen Howle (Amy-Leigh Hickman) accidentally flushes May-Li's (Stacy Liu) necklace down the toilet, she thinks about what she should do. When Carmen pretends that the necklace was stolen, Mo (Reece Buttery) goes to use the toilet, but it is blocked, so Mike (Connor Byrne) tries to unblock it; however, his hand becomes stuck. The fireman is called to get Mike out. When Carmen gets Kazima (Akuc Bol) to help her get the necklace, the toilet ends up flooding the bathroom, so they call the plumber to mend the toilet and Carmen can only offer to pay £30, which the plumber accepts.
PoPo	1 December 2015	Pik-Sen Lim	PoPo is May-Li's (Stacy Liu) grandmother. She turns up unannounced at The Dumping Ground, where May-Li is not too pleased to see her, to ask May-Li to take over the family business. She impresses the children with her kung-fu and May-Li agrees that PoPo can teach the children some. Jody (Kia Pegg) is torn about sending her mother a birthday card, so PoPo suggests she express her feelings in a letter without sending it. PoPo makes it clear to May-Li that she still does not accept her family as May-Li's partner is a woman and her children are not biologically hers. May-Li decides to stay on at The Dumping Ground, but gives PoPo the chance to meet her children. Later, May-Li receives a family heirloom from PoPo, a diary from her great-great-grandfather.
Jasna	8 December 2015	Dolya Gavanski	Following her age assessment test, Jasna informs Kazima (Akuc Bol) that they have determined her birth year as 1997 and that she is 18. Jasna tells Mike (Connor Byrne) that they have to move Kazima as they cannot let her live with underage children due to child protection. Jasna visits again to tell Kazima that the directions for her deportation have been issued and she will have to move to an adult hostel. Kazima runs away to prevent her deportation and Carmen (Amy-Leigh Hickman) tells Jasna, Mike and May-Li (Stacy Liu) that she has no idea where Kazima is. When Kazima is reunited with her father, Hakim (Richard Pepple), Jasna interviews him and realises he has been living in the UK illegally and advises him to apply for asylum. She is of Bosnian descent.
News Reporter	8 December 2015	Nisha Joshi	Following Kazima's age assessment, where her age has been determined as 18, Carmen (Amy-Leigh Hickman) contacts Dallas Campbell, who arranges for someone to film Kazima's appeal. The News Reporter asks Kazima to describe her story.
Hakim Tako	8 December 2015, 31 March 2017	Richard Pepple	Hakim is the father of Kazima (Akuc Bol), who tracks Kazima down after her deportation appeal on TV. Jasna (Dolya Gavanski) interviews him at The Dumping Ground and she realises he has been living in the UK illegally. Hakim is advised by Jasna to apply for asylum. Hakim and Kazima are shown a message on the laptop by Carmen (Amy-Leigh Hickman) by someone who may know Hakim's son and Kazima's brother in Kenya. Hakim decides to go to Kenya, leaving Kazima at The Dumping Ground as it is dangerous.

=== Series 4 (2016) ===
Character	Date(s)	Actor	Circumstances
Briony	29 January 2016	Tiana Benjamin	Alison is a woman, who after spotting Bailey (Kasey McKellar) at a football match, turns up at The Dumping Ground, claiming to be his mum. Jody (Kia Pegg) and Tyler (Miles Butler-Hughton) spot Alison outside a cocktail bar working, despite her saying she worked with old people. Jody and Tyler confront Alison when she meets up with Bailey at a cafe and Alison says she worked in the bar, but lost her job and home the previous day. Believing he will make the youth squad, Bailey arranges to rent a flat for him and Alison; however, Bailey does not make the squad but lies that he did. Alison tells Bailey she found out about the flat after being contacted by the estate agents as he is too young to sign rental agreements. The truth about Bailey being dropped from the academy soon emerges and he apologises to Alison. Alison flees from The Dumping Ground, but Bailey and Jimmy (Mark Theodore) track her down, but Bailey learns that Alison is actually called Briony and a friend of his mum's. Bailey and Mike track her down at the bus station and Bailey takes back the jewels and Alison insults Bailey.
Rowena	29 January 2016	Alison Hammond	Rowena and Lizzie are Ofsted inspectors, who turn up unannounced at The Dumping Ground. Rowena and Lizzie ask to see various documents and Rowena points out some health and safety issues before getting Floss (Sarah Rayson) and Sasha (Annabelle Davis) to show them around. Rowena, Lizzie, Floss and Sasha encounter Alison (Tiana Benjamin), a woman claiming to be Bailey's (Kasey McKellar) mum. Rowena confronts Mike (Connor Byrne) about the situation and Mike assures her that situations are normally dealt with. Rowena asks to see their safeguarding procedure and incident book. The following day, Rowena and Lizzie return and speak to the children; however, they agree to stay silent. Meanwhile, Rowena witnesses how a situation between Bailey and his father, Jimmy (Mark Theodore) is dealt with. The children later put on the play, impressing Rowena and Lizzie.
Lizzie	29 January 2016	Kate Copeland	
Mr Twigg	29 January 2016	Abas Eijanabi	When a bear costume is ruined for their play by Mischief (Sage), Harry (Philip Graham Scott) and Finn (Ruben Reuter) visit Mr Twigg at his closed restaurant with May-Li (Stacy Liu). They take the bear to borrow, but when the children find a bag of jewels hidden, they move the bear upstairs and Kazima (Akuc Bol) hides the jewels. Later, Mr Twigg visits and tells them that his property is being repossessed and the bear is valuable and one of the items the bailiffs had listed. The children decide to give the jewels to Mr Twigg, but find them stolen and it turns out Alison (Tiana Benjamin) took them.
Zach	12 February 2016	Jordan Bolger	Zach is a boy, who Tee (Mia McKenna-Bruce) runs into at the park. Zach sends Tee a text, apologising and asking to make it up. Sasha (Annabelle Davis) sends a text to Zach and Tee meets Zach at a cafe, with Carmen (Amy-Leigh Hickman) and Sasha watching them. Tee plays squash with Zach, but arrives home after injuring her knee and Zach offers Carmen a game of squash to get her into shape. Offended by his comments, Tee, Carmen and Sasha chase him out of the Dumping Ground.
Allen	12 February 2016	Ryan Wilkinson	Mo (Reece Buttery) is convinced there are aliens in the neighbourhood and when the other children make fun of him, Mo is determined to prove them wrong. In the park, he encounters Allen and the following time in the park, he witnesses Allen being teased by a group of boys. Mo returns Allen to The Dumping Ground, believing he is an alien and when Allen notices Mo's alien radio equipment, he is impressed and offers to improve it to get a better signal so he can call home. Mo and Bailey (Kasey McKellar) smuggle Allen into The Dumping Ground and they start to improve the equipment. They are interrupted by Mike (Connor Byrne) and Allen explains things to Mike and May-Li (Stacy Liu). The following day after completing the equipment, Allen finds it smashed and Mo admits he did it. Mo and Bailey track Allen down at home and Mo apologises for believing he was an alien. After fixing the equipment, Allen gets hold of his father, who is working far away and after talking with Mo, Allen's father invites Allen and his mother to live with him.
Alex	26 February 2016	Phil Rowson	When Tee (Mia McKenna-Bruce) goes to college for an interview, Alex is the tutor who shows her and a group of students around. During her interview, Alex asks Tee about how she finds growing up in care. Tee messes up on a question in her interview and ends up walking out. Later, Alex tells Carmen (Amy-Leigh Hickman) they wanted to offer Tee a place on the Arts Foundation course.
Drama Tutor	26 February 2016	Hetty Baynes Russell	When Carmen (Amy-Leigh Hickman) accompanies Tee to college for an interview, Carmen ends up in the Drama studio and impresses the Drama Tutor. Carmen is offered a place on the Drama course.
Tommo	4 March 2016	Melique Thompson-Dwyer	Tommo is an old friend of Sasha (Annabelle Davis) and she tells him she is now in care. Tommo meets Sasha outside The Dumping Ground and tells her they can live together with his brother. He leads her to a house to break into. Sasha goes through a dog flap and goes to let Tommo in at the front, but she is caught by Peter (Ian Kershaw), a man who lives there and Tommo runs away. Later, Sasha is annoyed with Tommo for leaving her, but he convinces Sasha to live with his brother with him. Sasha agrees, but she learns that she and Tommo would have to shoplift and she stays at the Dumping Ground.
Peter	4 March 2016	Ian Kershaw	When Sasha (Annabelle Davis) breaks into a house, Peter catches her.
Phoebe	25 March 2016	Tanya Vital	Phoebe, Mary and Kerr are temporary care workers to cover for Mike (Connor Byrne). The children ask her questions on what makes her better than Mike. Phoebe leaves when an argument breaks out after it emerges Carmen (Amy-Leigh Hickman) reported Mike to the police and explains to May-Li that she cannot deal with the amount of anger. Mary explains her husband died the previous year and that she was a foster carer. Mary cooks dinner, but she leaves when she realises how much the children miss and love Mike. Kerr gets the children to participate in a treasure hunt, but he ridicules Bailey's (Kasey McKellar) spelling. The children tell him Bailey is dyslexic, but he believes Bailey is lazy.
Mary	25 March 2016	Liz Crawther	
Kerr	25 March 2016	Matt Kennard	
Chair Person	25 March 2016	Judith Alexander	The chair person who holds Mike's (Connor Byrne) disciplinary hearing. The children burst into the meeting with Carmen's (Amy-Leigh Hickman) file and plead for Mike to be reinstated. He is given his job back.
Lou	30 September 2016 – 7 October 2016	Warwick Davis	Lou and Ange are potential adoptive parents for Sasha (Annabelle Davis). On a trip to the seaside, it becomes clear Sasha is not ready to give up on her family and Sasha plants goods from a souvenir shop in Ange's bag. Sasha thinks Harry (Philip Graham Scott) would be ideal for Lou and Ange and Harry agrees to get to know them.
Ange	30 September 2016 – 7 October 2016	Francesca Papagno	Lou and Ange are potential adoptive parents for Sasha (Annabelle Davis). On a trip to the seaside, it becomes clear Sasha is not ready to give up on her family and Sasha plants goods from a souvenir shop in Ange's bag. Sasha thinks Harry (Philip Graham Scott) would be ideal for Lou and Ange and Harry agrees to get to know them.
Doris	7 October 2016	Sheila Hancock	Doris is an old woman, who turns up in Carmen's (Amy-Leigh Hickman) salon unexpectedly. When she leaves, Carmen goes after her and Doris takes Carmen to her house. Carmen is stunned with Doris' house and dress collection and Doris allows Carmen to try a dress on. Doris is surprised Carmen is in care and Carmen is disgusted to learn Doris' son Felix (Don Gallagher) is moving her out of her home. When Felix visits Doris the next day, Carmen defends Doris and learns Doris is being moved to an old people's home. Doris visits Carmen with Felix and explains she has dementia. Doris is given Nigel the cat, to whom Floss (Sarah Rayson) is allergic.
Felix	7 October 2016	Don Gallagher	
Nigel	7 October 2016	Uncredited	
Sammy Doyle	14 October 2016 – 28 October 2016	Roderick Gilkison	Sammy is a boy who has to stay at The Dumping Ground for a while when his aunt is ill. He meets Carmen (Amy-Leigh Hickman) and Kazima (Akuc Bol), who tell him the rules. Sammy hears Jody's (Kia Pegg) baby simulation doll, but ignores it as he follows the rules, but later informs Jody where it is.
Duncan Bannatyne	14 October 2016	Himself	Duncan gives a speech to possible contenders for the Young Entrepreneur of the Year competition and Mo (Reece Buttery) gets Bailey (Kasey McKellar) to tell him about his business. Duncan presents the prize to a girl named Maya Young.
Hollie	14 October 2016	Leah Walker	Hollie is a girl Bailey (Kasey McKellar) meets at the opening of the Young Entrepreneur of the Year competition. After helping Hollie out at the park, Hollie and Bailey decide to combine their business and go to London for a marketing workshop. Bailey reveals to Hollie he lives in a children's home and takes a lighthearted comment from Hollie seriously. Hollie visits Bailey and the pair collect references and Bailey is invited to dinner at Hollie's, where she gives him the money for London. Back at The Dumping Ground, Bailey is arrested when customers accuse him of stealing money, but Hollie confesses to taking it. Bailey chooses to have nothing more to do with Hollie.
Simon	14 October 2016	Chris Jack	Simon is the father of Hollie (Leah Walker), who is impressed with Bailey (Kasey McKellar) when Hollie brings him to dinner. However, Simon takes a dislike to Bailey when he is accused of stealing money and arrested; however, Hollie confesses to stealing it.
Princess	14 October 2016	Guinness	Princess is Hollie's (Leah Walker) pet dog. Princess and Mischief (Sage) take a liking to each other.
Iona	21 October 2016	Calita Rainford	Iona is an artist Floss (Sarah Rayson) meets when she tries to raise money so the young people can go on their adventure trip. Floss and Finn (Ruben Reuter) take artwork by Tee (Mia McKenna-Bruce) to show Iona and try to persuade her to buy it. Iona refuses to and Floss tells lies about Finn in order to get her to change her mind. Iona contacts children's services about Floss, who contact Mike.
Aunt Peg	28 October 2016	Jane Holman	Peg is the aunt of Sammy (Roderick Gilkison), who collects Sammy from The Dumping Ground.
Kara	4 November 2016	Isobel Steele	Mo (Reece Buttery) meets Kara, who is selling cakes, and falls for her. Floss (Sarah Rayson) agrees to introduce Kara to Mo, but Mo upsets Kara when he spoils her cakes. Mo and Kara work together to bake a cake for Bailey's (Kasey McKellar) birthday, which ends up burnt when Mo turns the temperature up. Mo admits to Kara what he is truly like and the pair kiss.
Jim	26 November 2016	Samuel Holland	Jim is from children's services overseeing Tee (Mia McKenna-Bruce) and Carmen's (Amy-Leigh Hickman) move and he breaks the news to Tee that a housing policy reform means they will not be housed together. The young people occupy the office and will not move unless Jim does something, but are persuaded by Tee and Carmen to give up. Tee and Carmen are overjoyed when Jim has managed to house them together.
Rosie	2 December 2016	Zoe Iqbal	Kingsley (David Avery) introduces Rosie as his girlfriend to his sister, Jody (Kia Pegg) and Jody lets them sell Mike's carriage clock when Kingsley owes money to a gang. Jody is trapped in a fire at Kingsley's flat and Kingsley runs off when he finds out. Rosie tells Jody that Kingsley left her in the fire.
Gary	2 December 2016	Lee Warburton	Gary is Ryan Reeves' (Lewis Hamilton) independent visitor who Mike Milligan (Connor Byrne) brings into The Dumping Ground to help Ryan's relationship with his sister Chloe Reeves (Hannah Moncur). Ryan tells Gary he believes everyone loves Chloe and not him because she is nice and that he is bad. Ryan goes through with Gary's suggestion of writing a message on a balloon and then releasing it.

=== Series 5 (2017) ===
Character	Date(s)	Actor	Circumstances
Edward Umbleby	20 January 2017 – 3 February 2017	Jaimie Boubezari	Edward is the son of Peter (Simon Ludders) and Janet Umbleby (Alison Pargeter). The young people are mistaken for Mike Milligan and May-Li Wang's children, but they explain to the Umblebys that they live in a children's home. Floss Guppy (Sarah Rayson) tells Peter and Janet about the young people's lives and Mike stops their son, Edward, choking on a cherry stone and the Umblebys tell them to leave. Edward helps Kazima Tako (Akuc Bol), Toni Trent (Nelly Currant) and Billie Trent (Gwen Currant) leave his house when they return a doll and when Archie Able (Jethro Beliba) and Joseph Stubbs (Yousef Naseer) are caught in the garden and accused of trespassing, Edward blames Kazima, Toni and Billie. Edward crashes his drone into Kazima's cake and Edward has to help Kazima bake another one. She decides to help Edward stand up to his father and Mr Umbleby is annoyed with Edward spending time with Kazima and playing his guitar. Kazima offers to stay away from Edward if his parents return his guitar and Edward gets his guitar back.
Kev	20 January 2017	Mark Homer	Kev is the boyfriend of Kelly Bellman (Sandy Foster), the father of Roddy (Alfie Browne-Sykes) and a daughter with Kelly and the stepfather of Sasha Bellman (Annabelle Davis), Dexter Bellman (Alexander Aze) and Murphy Bellman. After a football match, Kev speaks with Bailey Wharton (Kasey McKellar) about taking up coaching and going to college in America. When Kev discovers Roddy is behind burglaries, he offers Bailey a reference for a college in America in Roddy's place.
Roddy	20 January 2017	Alfie Browne-Sykes	Roddy is the son of Kev (Mark Homer), the stepson of Kelly Bellman (Sandy Foster), the half-brother of Kev and Kelly's daughter and the stepbrother of Sasha Bellman (Annabelle Davis), Dexter Bellman (Alexander Aze) and Murphy Bellman. Roddy and Bailey Wharton (Kasey McKellar) organise a football match and Roddy gets Dexter to lie that a 17-year-old player is his age. Dexter confides in Bailey about how Roddy threatens him if he does not do what he says. Roddy catches Dexter flattening the van's tyres and Roddy warns Bailey to back off. Bailey tells Sasha about the trouble Dexter has got into and they find Dexter and Roddy. Sasha learns that Kelly is involved in Roddy's plans and she takes Dexter with Bailey. Sasha calls the police and Kev offers Bailey a reference for a college in America in place of Roddy.
Professor Edwin von Trockelbomf III	27 January 2017	Nigel Planer	
Sophie	10 February 2017	Caitlan Barrett Ward	
Katherine	17 February 2017	Julia Haworth	
Adam	17 February 2017	Andrew Hanratty	
Steve	17 February 2017	Lawrence Neale	
Sam	3–17 March 2017	Oliver Wellington	
George	3–17 March 2017	Paul Barber	
Ms Bloomfield	10 March 2017	Lucy Benjamin	
Raplh	10 March 2017	Mike Grady	
Anjli	17 March 2017	Manpreet Bambra	
Manny	24 March 2017	Steffan Peddie	
Amir Tako	31 March 2017	Uncredited	
Mimi Blunt	27 October 2017	Stirling Gallacher	
Sally Harper	3 November 2017	Samantha Morris	Samantha and Dom are the potential adoptive parents of Billie Trent (Gwen Currant) and Toni Trent (Nelly Currant). When Billie and Toni return from their house, Floss suggests that Toni is not keen on the adoption and Floss tells Billie that she has to make sure that Toni does not change her mind. Billie and Floss try to convince Toni that living with many other people is annoying. Toni announces to Billie that she does not want to be fostered and Billie and Floss lock Toni in the shed, so Billie pretends to be herself and Toni to the social worker, Diane. When Toni leaves the shed, Diane realises what Billie has done and Billie and Toni are both annoyed with each other. Toni refuses to talk to Billie and Floss tells Toni that despite having a mother, she would like a family. When the Harpers visit so Billie can talk to them, Toni decides that she wants to live with them, and both sisters move in.
Dom Harper	3 November 2017	Phil Yarrow	
Diane	3 November 2017	Poppy Jhakra	
Police Officer Sykes	10 November 2017	Dylan Barnes	
Josh	17 November 2017	Bailey Hayden	
TV Journalist	8–15 December 2017	Rayna Campbell	

== See also ==
- List of The Story of Tracy Beaker (franchise) characters
- List of The Story of Tracy Beaker characters
- List of Tracy Beaker Returns characters
