= The Dumping Ground series 1 =

The Dumping Ground
- Series 1
- Series One Title Card
- Starring: Connor Byrne; Kay Purcell; Amy-Leigh Hickman; Philip Graham Scott; Noah Marullo; Mia McKenna-Bruce; Joe Maw; Jessie Williams; Chris Slater; Jessica Revell; Daniel Pearson; Miles Butler-Hughton; Kia Pegg; Leanne Dunstan; Sarah Rayson; Reece Buttery
- No. of episodes: 13

Release
- Original network: CBBC; CBBC HD; BBC HD (2013)
- Original release: 4 January – 15 March 2013

Series chronology
- ← Previous; Tracy Beaker Returns Series 3 Next → Series 2

The first series of the British children's television series The Dumping Ground began broadcasting on 4 January 2013 on CBBC and ended on 15 March 2013. The series follows the lives of the children living in the fictional children's care home of Elm Tree House, nicknamed by them "The Dumping Ground". It consists of thirteen, thirty-minute episodes. It is the ninth series in The Story of Tracy Beaker franchise.

== Series synopsis ==
Everyone from series 3 of the previous show Tracy Beaker Returns returned for this series, with the exceptions of Sapphire Fox, Liam O'Donovan and Tracy Beaker. It also sees new characters Faith, Floss (from episode 6) and Mo (from episode 10). Gus leaves after episode 5 and Elektra and Gina leave after the series finale. It is also the final series to feature Elmtree House. The opening 2 episodes have the YP being home alone after Mike goes on holiday and Gina goes to hospital. After that, Lily's dad's girlfriend (Shannay) moves into their flat causing chaos for Lily, Jody lives with her mum for a while before Carmen and Tyler realise that she's being abused by her older brother (Kingsley), Gus goes through turmoil when he gets the chance to get fostered and does eventually agree to, Faith's history is revealed, new girl Floss bargains Jeff off Harry, Frank gets a job in a cafe after failing his exams and Rick meets his dad who has been in prison. Towards the end of series 1, the Dumping Ground (DG) go on a day trip to a Edwardian mansion and roleplay as Edwardians for the day, new resident Mo causes trouble for some residents, Carmen, Tee and Lily fall out on a sleepover, Tyler does a big practical joke on Elektra, Carmen meets an exotic girl (Esme), and in the series 1 finale, Faith's brother suddenly arrives at Elm Tree House, when she believes he's dead.

== Cast ==
=== Main ===
- Connor Byrne as Mike Milligan
- Kay Purcell as Gina Conway
- Amy-Leigh Hickman as Carmen Howle
- Philip Graham Scott as Harry Jones
- Noah Marullo as Gus Carmichael (episodes 1-5 only)
- Mia McKenna-Bruce as Tee Taylor
- Joe Maw as Johnny Taylor
- Jessie Williams as Lily Kettle
- Christopher John Slater as Frank Matthews
- Jessica Revell as Elektra Perkins
- Daniel Pearson as Rick Barber
- Miles Butler-Hughton as Tyler Lewis
- Kia Pegg as Jody Jackson
- Leanne Dunstan as Faith Davis
- Sarah Rayson as Floss Guppy (from episode 6)
- Reece Buttery as Mo Michaels (from episode 10)

=== Guest ===
- Craig Conway as Bomb Squad Officer
- Jacqueline Phillips as Lydia Dillon
- Tony Neilson as Manager
- Sammy T. Dobson as Sarah
- Ben Cartwright as Steve Kettle
- Holly Quin-Ankrah as Shannay
- Neil Armstrong as Rob
- Victoria Alcock as Denise Jackson
- David Avery as Kingsley Jackson
- James Bartlett as Luke Jackson
- Elizabeth Hall as Ronnie
- Sara Stephens as Dawn
- Katherine Monaghan as Social Worker
- Ian Stewart Robinson as Police Officer
- Adeleina Williams as Jade
- Louise Jameson as Angel
- Chris Simmons as Gerry Barber
- Ryan Enver as Builder
- Carmen Munroe as Hattie
- Philip Harrison as George
- Rachel Teate as Rachel
- Sophie Skelton as Esme Vasquez-Jones
- Selina Giles as Mrs Vasquez-Jones
- Isaac Ssebandeke as Razz Davis
- Robert Haythorne as Solly
- Lee Lomas as Cass

=== Casting ===
Screenterrier announced the casting of characters Mo, Floss and Faith in September 2012.

== Episodes ==
No. overall	No. in series	Title	Directed by	Written by	Original release date	UK viewers (millions)
1	1	"Home Alone (Freedom – Part 1)"	Craig Lines	Elly Brewer	4 January 2013	0.63
Without adult supervision, the residents of Elm Tree House seize the opportunity to be free and wreak havoc. With Mike enjoying a well-deserved holiday and Gina hospitalized following the recovery of an unexploded grenade, the young people become obstreperous, driving Gus to breaking point. Faith and Elektra act as if they are actual care workers. First Appearance: Leanne Dunstan as Faith Davis & Sarah Rayson as Floss Guppy. This was the first episode. Tracy and Sapphire are mentioned in this episode by Gus and Harry.
2	2	"Liberty in the DG (Freedom – Part 2)"	Craig Lines	Emma Reeves	4 January 2013	0.63
Still without their beloved care worker, the children soon realise that they are unable to fend for themselves and turn against each other. Having spent all of their money, the residents face starvation with the fridge devoured of all its contents. Meanwhile, Elektra takes advantage of the ensuing fall-out through attempting to win herself a free trip to Australia, which eventually backfires, as Gina is discharged from the hospital and overhears what is going on, the children receive a telling off from Gina, Faith pretending to be a care worker, Frank and Tyler gambling and the rest stealing Johnny’s money and locking him and Tee in the coal bunker. She tells them she’s stopping the pocket money until they pay Johnny back and the petty cash and she also told them it was an irresponsible thing to do they could’ve got hurt or worse and also tells them if Mike found out about this he would never take another holiday again she was pleased when Tee phoned her, and she talks to Elektra about the situation with the Australia trip, then joining the people to clean up the backyard. The episode ends with Mike returning from his holiday, and he tells everyone what has been happening.
3	3	"Baby"	Craig Lines	Dawn Harrison	11 January 2013	0.68
When Shannay, the pregnant girlfriend of Lily's dad, Steve, moves into the flat, Lily feels jealous and thus commits rebellious acts. Shannay accidentally breaks the frame of Lily's picture, which is the last straw for Lily, so, with Mike's permission, she temporarily moves back into The Dumping Ground. However, after some reassuring advice from those closest to her, Lily eventually returns to the flat and meets her new half-sibling, Jonah. Meanwhile Tyler and Rick are looking for ways to remove Tyler's tooth. Absent: Noah Murallo as Gus Carmichael
4	4	"S.O.S."	Craig Lines	Dawn Harrison	18 January 2013	0.50
Jody seems happy to be back with her family, but Carmen soon discovers she lives in terror of her brother, Kingsley, and plots a rescue mission. Meanwhile, Gus and Tyler learn morse code because it is more quicker than texting on a phone, even with the torches.
5	5	"What Would Gus Want?"	Stewart Svaasand	Elly Brewer	25 January 2013	0.63
The Dumping Ground is divided when a same-sex couple show an interest in fostering Gus. As Johnny and Elektra debate about whether gay couples should be allowed to adopt, Gus is in turmoil about leaving the Dumping Ground and father figure Mike behind. But through a series of phases Gus eventually decides to be fostered. Last Appearance: Noah Marullo as Gus Carmichael
6	6	"The Real Faith Davis"	Stewart Svaasand	Heather Imani	1 February 2013	0.55
Wicked whispers fly when the police come to see Faith, who will not say why. Until Elektra and the others spread gossip about Faith and Mike and Gina tell the others off for being horrible. Meanwhile new girl Floss arrives and wonders where on Earth she has been dumped when Harry informs her of the Dumping Ground's past. First Appearance: Sarah Rayson as Floss Guppy
7	7	"The Truth Is Out There"	Stewart Svaasand	Emma Reeves	8 February 2013	0.59
After bad exam results, Frank denounces school and gets himself a job in a café where he falls for the waitress, Jade, who introduces him to a psychic. Is he being taken for a ride?
8	8	"Dreamland"	Stewart Svaasand	Mark Burt	15 February 2013	0.49
Rick's father, Gerry, turns up for start a fresh start with him. But are Rick and Gerry really ready? Meanwhile, Gina's mum, Hattie, turns up and Tee thinks that Mike wants Hattie in a home. Absent: Jessie Williams as Lily Kettle Special Guest Appearance: Chris Simmons as Gerry
9	9	"A Day in the Past"	Diana Patrick	Steve Turner	22 February 2013	0.46
It is the day of the Dumping Ground's annual day out and the Young People decide to be Edwardians for the day. However, the day is not fun when Johnny is in charge and he ruins the day for everyone when he humiliates Elektra making fun of Carmen’s schoolwork and making comments about Lilly and her dad and he accidentally throws food over a painting that gets him and the rest of the gang kicked out and everyone tells him he ruined it for them all. Absent: Leanne Dunstan as Faith Davis
10	10	"Oh, Mo!"	Diana Patrick	Elly Brewer	1 March 2013	0.43
Mo is the Dumping Ground's new eccentric resident and everyone thinks he is a bit strange. especially Tyler. Tee takes pity on Mo but Mo has not had a real friend before and Tee is soon annoyed with him. First Appearance: Reece Buttery as Mo Michaels Absent: Jessie Williams as Lily Kettle
11	11	"Seriously Funny"	Diana Patrick	Matt Evans	8 March 2013	0.42
When a big practical joke on Elektra backfires, Tyler decides it is time that he grew up. Meanwhile, Lily, Carmen and Tee fall out at an unsupervised sleepover at Lily's flat. Absent: Sarah Rayson as Floss Guppy
12	12	"Esme"	Diana Patrick	Nimer Rashed	15 March 2013	0.48
Carmen alienates the Dumping Ground kids when she finds a new best friend in exotic rich girl, Esme, who gives Carmen the chance to run away to Rio with her. Will Carmen leave the Dumping Ground and more importantly the country behind? Meanwhile, the kids start worrying when Mike starts having spasms of pain until he finds out it's a kidneystone.
13	13	"Scary Beasts"	Diana Patrick	Dawn Harrison	15 March 2013	0.65
A face from the past comes back to haunt Faith and brings danger to the Dumping Ground. And Mo buys a 'magic' egg which unexpectedly hatches into what Johnny and Elektra believe is a venomous snake! Last Appearances: Kay Purcell as Gina Conway and Jessica Revell as Elektra Perkins
