= List of Tracy Beaker Returns characters =

This is a list of characters that were introduced in CBBC's Tracy Beaker Returns. The series is based on The Story of Tracy Beaker by Jacqueline Wilson. It ran for three seasons from 2010 to 2012. The series follows The Story of Tracy Beaker that ran for five seasons from 2002 to 2005 and it is followed by The Dumping Ground that has aired since 2013. Connor Byrne has played the role of Mike Milligan for all three programmes although he left in the seventh series to live with his family in Ireland. Dani Harmer and Lisa Coleman reprised their roles as Tracy Beaker and Cam Lawson for Tracy Beaker Returns.

== Main characters ==
=== Gina Conway ===
Gina Conway
- Tracy Beaker character
- Portrayed by: Kay Purcell
- Duration: 2010–2013
- First appearance: Full Circle; 8 January 2010
- Last appearance: "Scary Beasts"; 15 March 2013
- Introduced by: Josephine Ward
- Spin-off appearances: Tracy Beaker Survival Files (2011–2012); The Dumping Ground Survival Files (2014)
In-universe information
- Occupation: Senior care worker
- Mother: Hattie
- Husband: Greg Conway
- Sons: Tim Conway; Tom Conway

Gina Conway, played by Kay Purcell, is a careworker at Elm Tree House in Tracy Beaker Returns and the first series of The Dumping Ground. She first appeared on 8 January 2010, the start of Tracy Beaker Returns, and continued appearing until 15 March 2013, the final episode in series 1 of The Dumping Ground.

Gina is of Jamaican descent with black and highlighted hair. She is kind and a great house mother to the children. Gina is very clever towards the children and the residents seem to respect her. She is able to control the children without them resenting her interventions; however, the children sometimes see her as loud and brash when she is angry. Sometimes, that is the only way to get them to listen to her.

Gina first encounters Tracy Beaker (Dani Harmer) when she opens the door to her after Tracy arrives at the Dumping Ground. Not really understanding who Tracy is, Gina tells Tracy that Mike Milligan (Connor Bryne) has gone out somewhere. Gina is sympathetic and lets Tracy in as it is pouring with rain outside. The kids at the Dumping Ground recognise Tracy from a television broadcast and Tracy gives a copy of her signed autobiography to Gina for 99p less. Gina allows Tracy to tuck all the kids into their beds. When Tracy finally talks to Mike, he accidentally lets slip to Gina that Tracy was arrested for using Cam Lawson (Lisa Coleman)'s credit card. Gina is angry because she let Tracy put the kids to bed. Gina does not warm to Tracy at first, but grows to adore her and usually stand up for her. Gina then encounters trouble with one of the older children, Sapphire Fox (Saffron Coomber) when she does not allow her to go with her father on his tour, but that was for safety reasons. Gina is strict but cares very much about the kids.

Gina appears throughout the first series of The Dumping Ground, continuing her role as a care worker; however, at the beginning of series 2, new care worker May-Li Wang reveals that Gina no longer works at the care home. Head writer (at the time) Elly Brewer confirmed on Twitter that Gina had been given a bit of a promotion, in order to be able to afford to keep her mum Hattie in a care home. Gina's mum Hattie has dementia, she made an appearance in the 8th episode of series 1. Gina has been mentioned 3 times after her off-screen departure, by May-Li in "Jody in Wonderland", Mike in "Hope" (series 2, episode 12) and Tyler in "Snake" (series 7, episode 8)

She has a husband named Greg, who calls her "Snugglebum", and is the president of the local Rotary Club where Gina is practising her ballroom dancing for in "Snake Bite".

She is also fond of her plants, and is shown to be distressed when Johnny angrily smashes her plant in "What You Don't Know". She also kept a slipper orchid in "Secrets", which Frank calls "her alien plant". In "By the Book" Gina lets Tee water her plant, but repeatedly tells her to stop pouring it as she "is hurting the plant", which leads to Tee snapping at her to do it herself and storming out.

=== Carmen Howle ===
Carmen Howle
- Tracy Beaker character
- Portrayed by: Amy-Leigh Hickman
- Duration: 2010–2016
- First appearance: Full Circle; 8 January 2010
- Last appearance: "One For Sorrow"; 25 November 2016
- Introduced by: Josephine Ward
- Spin-off appearances: Tracy Beaker Survival Files (2011–2012); The Dumping Ground Survival Files (2014); The Dumping Ground: I'm... (2016–2017)
In-universe information
- Occupation: Student
- Mother: Helen Howle

Carmen Howle, portrayed by Amy-Leigh Hickman, made her first appearance on 8 January 2010 in series 1 of Tracy Beaker Returns during the episode "Full Circle". She departed in series 4 during the episode "One for Sorrow".

Carmen is an exceptionally outgoing girl who shares much of her life with Lily, becoming saddened when she leaves the Dumping Ground. Carmen is medium-height with long brown hair and brown eyes and often wears a lot of make-up. She seems eager, kind and caring, but impatient, although she has a tendency to appear light-headed, to be judgemental, and to spill secrets. Her favourite colour is pink, and she has turbulent relationships with many of the other residents of the Dumping Ground, such as Bailey, Elektra and Johnny. She also has a terrible relationship with her mother, who abandoned her when she was little, so that she could have a holiday.

In "Family Values", Carmen is lonely when Lily gets fostered. No-one wants to hear her problems so she takes a precious item from each resident.

In "Viva Carmen", Carmen's mum, Helen, returns, saying she wants Carmen to live with her in Spain. However, Helen then dumps Carmen for her ex, Lee.

In "The Werewolf", Carmen thinks she saw a werewolf. The werewolf is actually Sapphire's brother Riff wearing a mask.

Carmen does not perform well at school – in the episode "A Day in the Past", Johnny insults her by saying: "I've seen your school grades; you'll be lucky to be a cleaner when you're older".

Carmen's best friend is Lily but is also shown to be good friends with Tee. She also has on and off friendships with Jody and Elektra. Floss seems to look up to Carmen, as they like the same things, such as make-up. Carmen also went out with Rick in the episode "Be My Girl" but the two broke up after finding their relationship too challenging.

In "Party Games", Carmen and Bailey battle it out for celebrity foster parents. Carmen wins, but turns down the opportunity when her potential foster mum insults the other children.

In "Stuck with You", Carmen and Jody, argue over a musical box, which Jody bought. They argue so much, that Floss handcuffs them together, but loses the key.

In "Now You See Me", Carmen tries to discourage Tee from doing street art.

In "Fake It to Make It", Carmen applies to be the face of the future. She gets through to the second selection round, which involves doing science experiments. She messes up though, and does not get the part.

In "The Goodbye Girl", she gives Tyler some dating advice.

In "What Matters" and "Refuge", she helps Kazima struggle through her application to stay in the UK.

In "Slings and Arrows", she directs the Shakespeare play the kids are doing to save Ashdine Ridge.

In "Stepping Up", Carmen, Jody and Tee work together in a street dance competition.

In "They Walk Among Us", she helps Tee on her date with Zach, a fitness coach.

In "Growing Pains", she goes with Tee to an interview for college. She gets lost while waiting for Tee, and finds herself in a drama class. She gets an offer to come to the college, but denies, and accepts for Tee on her behalf.

In "First Past the Post", she tells the police that Mike lost her file. She does not tell the other kids, though.

In "Survivors", she stays behind to look after Harry with Ryan. Harry runs away to Mike's house. Carmen and Ryan find him there and take him back. She tells Ryan that she told the police, and is going to tell Harry, but Mike tells her not to.

In "The End of It All", it comes out that she told the police. When Mike comes back, she is forgiven, though.

She makes a final appearance in "One for Sorrow" with Tee when they move out together.

=== Tee Taylor ===
Tee Taylor
- Tracy Beaker character
- Portrayed by: Mia McKenna-Bruce
- Duration: 2010–
- First appearance: Full Circle; 8 January 2010
- Introduced by: Josephine Ward (2010); Jonathan Phillips (2017, 2018)
- Spin-off appearances: Tracy Beaker Survival Files (2011–2012); The Dumping Ground Survival Files (2014); The Dumping Ground: I'm... (2016–2017)
In-universe information
- Occupation: Student; Tea room worker
- Mother: Lucy Taylor
- Adoptive father: Mr Watson (foster)
- Adoptive mother: Mrs Watson (foster)
- Stepfather: Keith
- Brothers: Johnny Taylor
- Sisters: Hannah Watson (foster)
- Half-sisters: Hope

Tee Taylor, portrayed by Mia McKenna-Bruce, made her first appearance on 8 January 2010 in series 1 of Tracy Beaker Returns during the episode "Full Circle". She is the longest-serving character of The Dumping Ground.

Tee was small and diminutive, yet understanding, kind and caring, although her brother's controlling and overprotective influence over her in the first series of "Tracy Beaker Returns" made her a quieter character. She has dark blonde, almost brown hair and brown eyes. She also shows a caring personality towards younger children, like Mo, Floss, Harry and her younger sister Hope. Tee and Ryan Reeves often have issues with each other, and they always fall out and accuse each other of things, which often becomes quite serious in certain situations.

In "By the Book", when Tracy is told to enforce the cleaning rota, Johnny believes it will get him and his sister fostered, and starts volunteering himself and Tee for everyone's chores in return for gold stars in his file. He begins to force her to do chores when she does not want to. But Tracy's attempt to deal with the situation results in Tee almost getting injured, resulting in Johnny lashing out at her for not looking after Tee properly, and she begins to reconsider her future at the Dumping Ground, until Tee and Johnny apologise to her the next day.

In "What You Don't Know", Tee, and Johnny return to the Dumping Ground from their trial foster placement with Mr and Mrs Watson. Everyone who is involved in the placement faces an awkward situation: the Watsons are happy to foster Tee, but not Johnny. Eventually, Tee decides not to be fostered as she does not want to leave her brother behind.

In "Shadows", Tee finds a trail of riddles, each leading to a different clue, which eventually leads her to the time capsule which was buried at the Dumping Ground in The Story of Tracy Beaker.

In "Summer Holiday", she ruins a holiday by accidentally forgetting to close a gate and letting sheep get into the farm house where they are staying. When Lily and Carmen plan to go to Lily's father's campsite, Tee goes on the bus to stop them but the bus moves and they are stuck on the bus until Wales. When the man with tickets comes and collects them, he asks for Tee's ticket but she did not have one and she asks to get off. Carmen goes with Tee leaving Lily on the bus by herself. Five seconds later the bus stops again and it's Lily. They walk off through a wood. And Tee finds herself at a holiday place. Later they are on their new holiday, all thanks to Tee.

In "Oh, Mo", Tee was made to look after new, eccentric resident, Mo. She soon regretted her decision when Mo started clamouring for her company and saying they were best friends. This led to an accident in which Mo was injured. Mike decided that Mo should not live in Elm Tree House after the incident, but the young people beg for Mo to stay, so he did.

In "Hope", Tee gets a letter from her mum, who wants to meet up with her and Johnny. Johnny tells her not to, as he thinks it might be a trap, but Tee goes to see her mum at the women's refuge and meets her baby sister, Hope. It is revealed that Tee's mum has left her abusive boyfriend Keith. Tee later gets worried that her mum is not looking after Hope properly, and steals her, but she bumps into Faith, who notifies Johnny. He pretends to go along with Tee's plan to get the baby fostered but secretly texts their mum. She got Hope back, and Tee and Johnny see her regularly.

In "Now You See Me", Tee makes friends with a street artist, and starts doing graffiti, which nearly results in her getting arrested.

In "Breaking In", Tee and Kazima are at the Dumping Ground on their own, and end up battling against two burglars who break into the house.

In "Dragon Slayer", Tee's older brother, Johnny, is about to leave to join the army, when both Tee and Johnny step-father, Keith, turns up to see Hope. He soon becomes trouble, and then Johnny has to face down Keith to get him to go away for good. When Keith leaves, Johnny leaves to join the army.

In "Who Are You", Tee and Ryan Nearly make up, before a boy from Ryan's old care home walks in and spills the beans, of what was actually meant to happen. Ryan pretended to make up with Tee, but all the information Tee gave him about what he thought about Ryan, and the order that the other kids came in, to upset the other children.

In "What Matters", Tee naughtily goes out with Sasha to skate night, when she was not meant to, and used Billie and Toni to cover for her. This gets the twins grounded. Tee admits, she made them cover for her, but it is revealed that May-Li knew they had gone. She runs away to buy presents for the twins and Kazima, who was applying to stay in the UK.

In "Hold the Front Page", Tee accuses Ryan of pushing Finn down the stairs, and she claims she saw him push him which later on she did not because Finn faked his fall to get attention.

In "Growing Pains", Tee goes to an art college interview with Carmen. She struggles to find her feet, and messes up the interview. Carmen gets a place at the drama section, and they fall out. Tee burns all her art, but Carmen had accepted the place at the college. They then make up.

In "One for Sorrow", Tee and Carmen move out of Ashdene Ridge to live together in a flat.

In the final two episodes of series 5 ("Save the DG" and "What Lies Beneath"), Tee makes a guest appearance along with Johnny, Elektra and Frank to save Ashdene Ridge.

Tee also makes another guest appearance in series 6 episode 24 alongside Tracy, Lily, Liam, Frank, Bailey, Toni and Bille to see Mike getting married.

=== Harry Jones ===
Harry Jones
- Tracy Beaker character
- Portrayed by: Philip Graham Scott
- Duration: 2010–2016
- First appearance: Full Circle; 8 January 2010
- Last appearance: "One for Sorrow"; 25 November 2016
- Introduced by: Josephine Ward
- Spin-off appearances: Tracy Beaker Survival Files (2011–2012); The Dumping Ground Survival Files (2014)
In-universe information
- Occupation: Student
- Adoptive father: Lou; Adam Aycliffe (foster)
- Adoptive mother: Ange; Nina Aycliffe (foster)
- Brothers: Finn McLaine (foster)
- Sisters: Claire Aycliffe (foster)

Harry Jones, portrayed by Philip Graham Scott, made his first appearance on 8 January 2010 in series 1 of Tracy Beaker Returns during the episode "Full Circle". He departed in series 4 during the episode "One for Sorrow".

During Tracy Beaker Returns, Harry looks up to Sapphire Fox, as he is one of the younger residents, and she is a maternal figure – he finds it difficult to adjust when she leaves Elm Tree House to get her own flat, and later identifies Faith Davis as a maternal figure to him. When she leaves, this changes to Ryan Reeves. He is initially a diminutive but cheeky character; he enjoyed carrying round his treasured toy giraffe named Jeff, until Floss took him for herself when she arrived at the Dumping Ground. Harry is small, with a thicket of curly blond hair and blue eyes. He appears to be wearing wellies most of the time during the earlier series.

During The Dumping Ground, Harry finds new friends in Mo Michaels and Floss Guppy, later revealing his secret passion for wrestling. He does leave in the third series in the sixth episode, "It's Not about the Money", to Floss's dismay, after finding a foster placement, but then soon returns on the ninth episode, "Long Way Home", when something goes wrong with his foster family and with his fellow foster Brother Finn McLaine. In "The Goodbye Girl" he gives Floss his Jeff. She lets him borrow it in "Survivors" and then gives it to Mike, who is suspended.

In "Perfect Match", Sasha thinks that her adoptive parents would suit Harry. He comes round to the idea, and Lou and Ange decide to look further into the possibility.

=== Frank Matthews ===
Frank Matthews
- Tracy Beaker character
- Portrayed by: Chris Slater
- Duration: 2010–2015, 2017–2018
- First appearance: Full Circle; 8 January 2010
- Last appearance: "Missing Presumed Single"; 7 December 2018
- Introduced by: Josephine Ward (2010); Lis Steele (2015); Jonathan Phillips (2017, 2018)
- Spin-off appearances: Tracy Beaker Survival Files (2011–2012); The Dumping Ground Survival Files (2014); The Dumping Ground Dish Up (2015)
In-universe information
- Occupation: Student; Waiter
- Grandfathers: Eric Matthews

Frank Matthews played by Chris Slater, was a resident of Elm Tree House throughout Tracy Beaker Returns and the first two series of The Dumping Ground. He has cerebral palsy, and is 26 years old as of 2021 – he is tall and has blonde hair and brown eyes. He is a kind, caring and often gullible character who supports Manchester United, and enjoys pranking people along with his best friend Liam O'Donovan. During the course of The Dumping Ground, he becomes a waiter, begins a relationship with another waitress, Jade, and is reunited with his best friend Liam, eventually leaving Ashdene Ridge so they can live together.

Frank was seen to appear in a brand new mini-series titled The Dumping Ground Dish Up, with the five appearances of Sapphire, Elektra, Johnny and Lily.

In the series 3 finale, "Refuge", Frank made a guest appearance, where he comforted Kazima, and later looked for her, as she ran away. She was found with her dad, in which Frank, Carmen and Mike founded them, and brought them back to Ashdene Ridge.

Frank made another guest appearance, in "What Lies Beneath" (series 5 Finale), as an estate officer.

=== Johnny Taylor ===
Johnny Taylor
- Tracy Beaker character
- Portrayed by: Joe Maw
- Duration: 2010–2015, 2017
- First appearance: Full Circle; 8 January 2010
- Last appearance: "What Lies Beneath"; 16 December 2017
- Introduced by: Josephine Ward (2010); Jonathan Phillips (2017)
- Spin-off appearances: Tracy Beaker Survival Files (2011–2012); The Dumping Ground Survival Files (2014); The Dumping Ground Dish Up (2015)
In-universe information
- Occupation: Student; Soldier
- Mother: Lucy Taylor
- Stepfather: Keith Taylor
- Sisters: Tee Taylor
- Half-sisters: Hope Taylor

Jonathan "Johnny" Taylor, played by Joe Maw throughout all series of Tracy Beaker Returns and The Dumping Ground, is Tee and Hope Taylor's older brother. He is a very tidy person, who is initially overprotective of his sister Tee following a difficult relationship with their mum's boyfriend. Johnny is medium-height, with brown hair and dark grey eyes, and gets on well with many residents of the Dumping Ground, forming frenemyships with characters such as Elektra, Liam, Tyler and later Bailey. He is 11 years old when he is introduced in the series.

In the first series of Tracy Beaker Returns, he is introduced as an overprotective brother desperate to get both himself and his sister Tee fostered, although he later softens his approach. As the series progresses, he learns not to let his anger get the better of him, although in The Dumping Ground's first series, he is verbally attacked by the other children for displaying homophobic attitudes after he hears of Gus being fostered by a lesbian couple. At the end of the third series, he leaves to join the army.

Johnny appeared in a mini-series titled The Dumping Ground Dish Up, alongside Sapphire, Elektra, Frank and Lily.

Johnny returned for a guest appearance for two episodes along with Tee, Frank and Elektra in the second half of series 5 in December 2017, to help stop Peter Umpleby succeeding in getting Ashdene Ridge closed and knocked down.

Johnny was credited in series 4 episode 6 but he was not seen.

=== Lily Kettle ===
Lily Kettle
- Tracy Beaker character
- Portrayed by: Jessie Williams
- Duration: 2010–2015, 2018, 2023
- First appearance: "Full Circle"; 8 January 2010
- Last appearance: "Life Is What You Bake It"; 9 June 2023
- Introduced by: Josephine Ward (2010); Jonathan Phillips (2018)
- Spin-off appearances: Tracy Beaker Survival Files (2011–2012); The Dumping Ground Survival Files (2014); The Dumping Ground Dish Up (2015)
In-universe information
- Occupation: Student; Café owner
- Father: Steve Kettle
- Adoptive father: Matt Perry (foster)
- Adoptive mother: Christie Perry (foster); Cam Lawson (foster)
- Stepmother: Shannay
- Sisters: Rosie Kettle; Poppy Kettle; Tracy Beaker (foster)
- Half-brothers: Jonah Kettle

Lily Kettle is the daughter of Steve Kettle (Ben Cartwright) and a resident of Elm Tree House throughout Tracy Beaker Returns. She appears as a resident on-and-off throughout the show, and throughout the first two series of The Dumping Ground, before eventually departing for good.

She proves herself quite quickly to be a competent and protective mother figure to her younger sisters, Poppy (Katie Anderson) and Rosie Kettle (Claudia Colling/Millie Redfearn), following their mother's death and father's inability to care for them, eventually challenging their foster parents as she finds it difficult to not be in control.

Lily has a strong friendship with Carmen Howle (Amy-Leigh Hickman) during the first series onwards. Lily and Carmen fall out when Lily accuses Carmen of wanting to take over the motherly role of Lily's younger sisters, Poppy and Rosie. However, the two friends reconcile.

Lily and her sisters are fostered in "Family Values". Lily returns to the Dumping Ground in "Sisters". Despite the protests of her foster parents Matt and Christie, Lily still wanted to have primary control over the care of her sisters. Tracy's attempts to resolve the matter end in failure.

However, in "Fallen", Matt and Christie decide to take her back, against Lily's wishes. A dramatic episode ends in Lily falling from a two-storey roof; however, besides minor injuries and a broken leg and arm, she makes a full recovery. Cam eventually decides to foster Lily, after expressing her doubts about fostering another child. Lily and Carmen's friendship is tested to the core when Carmen and Sapphire Fox (Saffron Coomber) purposely blame Lily for them and the rest of the children being sent to Burneywood because of the budget cuts. However, Carmen makes up with Lily upon defending her from the other kids who are mean to Lily because of recent events. In "Crushed", Tracy soon resents Cam and Lily's relationship and takes a night job at a cafe. She begins to be slightly mean and spiteful to Lily. At the end of the episode, Tracy decides that she would like to act as a proper and caring older sister for Lily.

In "The Scare Game", Lily encounters her father Steve during a shopping trip with Tracy. The problem is that Steve has a restraining order against him which precludes him from having contact with his three daughters; however, the issue is resolved as Steve manages to get the restraining order removed so he can be a proper father to Lily. In "Belongings", Lily shows animosity towards the couple who fostered her sisters, Poppy and Rosie, believing they should all be together. Lily does not feel as if the foster family can take care of her sisters properly.

In "Baby", Steve's girlfriend Shannay, who is moving in, becomes heavily pregnant. At first, Lily is unhappy with the situation, but when Shannay goes into early labour Lily blames herself what has happened and locks herself in the bathroom. When Lily is sleeping, she gets a text from her father with a picture of her new half-brother, Jonah. She then becomes very fond of him.

In episode 4 of the second series, Lily breaks the news to Carmen that she is leaving to live in Brighton with her father and Shannay, who have been asked by Shannay's sister to run a local café nearby the sea. Carmen accuses Steve of wanting to make Lily move away with him, but Lily admits to Carmen that she wants to go with her family, to see her half-brother, Jonah grow up. Lily promises to visit, as her sisters still live in the town, and leaves Ashdene Ridge and goes to Brighton with her family. She sends Carmen a picture of them together via message.

Following a brand new mini-series titled The Dumping Ground Dish Up, Lily was seen to be studying a catering course at college, as she is now 16 and hoping to become a professional cook. Four other former characters concluded Sapphire, Frank, Elektra and Johnny as they accompanied Lily's journey in help for her cookery project.

In series 6B, Lily made a guest appearance when Alex Walker (Connor Lawson) went to her café for work experience. She also returned again in the series finale for Mike's Wedding.

=== Gus Carmichael ===
Gus Carmichael
- Tracy Beaker character
- Portrayed by: Noah Marullo
- Duration: 2010–2013
- First appearance: Full Circle; 8 January 2010
- Last appearance: "What Would Gus Want?"; 25 January 2013
- Introduced by: Josephine Ward
- Spin-off appearances: Tracy Beaker Survival Files (2011–2012)
In-universe information
- Adoptive mother: Dawn (foster); Ronnie (foster)

Gus Carmichael is played by Noah Marullo, and was a resident of Elm Tree House during Tracy Beaker Returns and the first series of The Dumping Ground. Gus has Asperger syndrome, a form of autism, which makes him eager to keep tidy, and so he is a stickler for detail and he always carries notebooks and writes in them every day. Gus is tall for his age with black curly hair. He is always seen wearing a blue shirt and beige trousers, and enjoys playing the piano, but is socially awkward due to the Asperger's; he despises too much noise, and hates disorder, feeling that everything must be timetabled. During the first series of The Dumping Ground, he was fostered by a lesbian couple.

In series 1 episode 1, he is introduced as an autistic kid who likes to timetable, keep neat and write events in his notebook.

In series 1 episode 7, Liam discovers, Gus's notebook is full of peoples secrets, it includes things such as Frank and Liam's burger diving scam that they did which was witnessed by Gus, Mike's top 10 excuses for his "silent but deadlies" and spilling coffee on Gina's computer and blamed it on the kids, Gina's monthly biscuit consumption, her dress size and her husband calling her "Snugglebum".

In series 2 episode 4, Gus tries to find out two refugees stories, when they come to the DG.

In series 3 episode 2, he and Tracy try to find out who started a fire at Elm Tree House, when Dennis Stockle from Burnywood takes over the DG. Gus also falls down to Lily's room from the attic in this episode.

In The Dumping Ground series 1 episode 1, he drops a bomb, during the time when Mike is on holiday and Gina is in hospital. He does this because he was fed up of everything not being to schedule when the YP are home alone. Eventually, he gets henna poured on him and does not realise that he was covered in henna until the end.

In series 1 episode 4, he teaches Tyler about Morse Code and both of them try to communicate with each other with Morse Code which they eventually do when Tyler and Carmen were trapped with Jody in her house.

In series 1 episode 5, he goes through turmoil as there are so many options, when Mike offers him the chance to get fostered. He eventually does get fostered.

=== Sapphire Fox ===
Sapphire Fox
- Tracy Beaker character
- Portrayed by: Saffron Coomber
- Duration: 2010–2012
- First appearance: Full Circle; 8 January 2010
- Last appearance: "Goodbye, Tracy Beaker"; 23 March 2012
- Introduced by: Josephine Ward
- Spin-off appearances: Tracy Beaker Survival Files (2011–2012); The Dumping Ground Dish Up (2015)
In-universe information
- Occupation: Student
- Half-brothers: Riff

Sapphire Fox, played by Saffron Coomber, was a resident of "Elm Tree House" during all three series of Tracy Beaker Returns, although due to a busy schedule, the character only appeared on a recurring basis during the third series. Coomber did not return for the Tracy Beaker Returns spin-off, The Dumping Ground. Sapphire is tall and of mixed race. She has long (it is shorter in series 2) dark-brown curly hair and often wears large earrings, and her character is a guide and an older sister to most of the children, notably Harry Jones (Phillip Graham Scott). She attends college as of the third series. She can be motherly and overprotective to Harry, but also hides many secrets. During the third series she gets her own flat, but due to a flood she finds herself moving back to Elm Tree House and sharing with Elektra. The Dumping Ground later reveals that she moved away. She is sixteen on her last appearance.

Sapphire, Elektra, Frank, Johnny and Lily were all seen to appear in the mini-series titled The Dumping Ground Dish Up, as they all helped Lily on her new project concluding healthy living for her catering course.

=== Liam O'Donovan ===
Liam O'Donovan
- Tracy Beaker character
- Portrayed by: Richard Wisker
- Duration: 2010–2012, 2014, 2018
- First appearance: Full Circle; 8 January 2010
- Last appearance: "Missing Presumed Single"; 7 December 2018
- Introduced by: Josephine Ward (2010); Lis Steele (2014); Jonathan Phillips (2018)
- Spin-off appearances: Tracy Beaker Survival Files (2011–2012); Liam's Story (2014)
In-universe information
- Occupation: Student
- Brothers: Jack O'Donovan

Liam O'Donovan is a former resident of Elm Tree House played by actor Richard Wisker. He was a resident of Elm Tree House throughout "Tracy Beaker Returns". Liam is of medium-height and has brown hair and eyes. His best friend is Frank. Liam is sarcastic, cunning and sly, but he is kind and loyal to those he considers friends; he enjoys pranking and scamming people.

Liam is living with a foster family at the start of the first series but is sent back to the care home due to his bad behaviour. In the third series of the show, Liam buys counterfeit DVDs at the local market with Elektra's money. When the owners of the stall refuse to give him the money back, he trashes the stall from where he purchased them. The owners of the stall chase Liam. During the pursuit, Liam crashes into a woman, who drops her purse as a result of the collision. When Liam tries to assist her, she comes to the conclusion that he was trying to steal her bag. Meanwhile, Tracy then receives a letter from a person named Jack. It turns out that Jack is actually Liam's brother. Tracy researches more about Jack and Liam's relationship, and it is revealed that Liam was abandoned as a baby after he was born. Jack is a police officer who has been involved in an undercover operation. Although Jack offers Liam the opportunity to live together, Liam is hesitant to accept. He tells Tracy that he likes it at the care home because he is comfortable and has friends there. The episode concludes with Liam and Frank saying good-bye to one another. Liam then leaves the 'Dumping Ground' on the back of his brother's motorbike, waving good-bye to his best friend.

Liam, now 17 years old, returned to The Dumping Ground in the second series as part of an online mini-series titled Liam's Story; his story was resolved as he returned to the Dumping Ground in the final episode of the second series, departing from the show. Liam was mentioned in the third series of The Dumping Ground by Frank when he tried to help Kazima.

Liam returned for Mike's Wedding alongside Tee, Lily, Bailey, Toni, Billie and Frank and Tracy

=== Rosie Kettle ===
Rosie Kettle
- Tracy Beaker character
- Portrayed by: Claudia Colling (2010); Millie Redfearn (2011–2012)
- Duration: 2010–2012
- First appearance: Full Circle; 8 January 2010
- Last appearance: "Belonging"; 27 January 2012
- Introduced by: Josephine Ward
In-universe information
- Father: Steve Kettle
- Adoptive father: Matt Perry (foster)
- Adoptive mother: Christie Perry (foster)
- Stepmother: Shannay
- Sisters: Lily Kettle; Poppy Kettle
- Half-brothers: Jonah Kettle

Rosie Kettle, portrayed by Claudia Colling in series 1 and Millie Redfearn in series 2 and 3, made her first appearance on 8 January 2010 in series 1 of Tracy Beaker Returns during the episode "Full Circle". She departed in series 3 during the episode "Belonging".

When Carmen (Amy-Leigh Hickman) moves into Lily's (Jessie Williams) bedroom, Lily is hurt when Carmen takes over with Rosie and Poppy (Katie Anderson). Lily falls out with Carmen she unintentionally upsets Rosie by putting sparkles in her hair; however, they later make up.

Rosie is fostered with Lily and Poppy by Matt (Chris Robson) and Christie (Vicky Hall). When Lily is returned to The Dumping Ground after arguing with Matt and Christie about who is in charge of Rosie and Poppy, Tracy (Dani Harmer) takes Lily back to the Perry's to apologise. However, Rosie and Poppy get upset when Lily argues with Matt and Christie. On a visit to the Perry's, Christie announces to Lily that she can move back in, which pleases Rosie and Poppy; however, Lily does not seem enthusiastic.

With Lily living with him, Rosie and Poppy meet their father, Steve (Ben Cartwright), as he is hoping to get them back. However, the meeting does not go well and Rosie and Poppy run out crying. Lily decides to organise a meeting between her father and sisters in the park and she lies to Tracy about the park when she asks her to ask Christie to bring her sisters over. Tracy is not thrilled when she discovers Lily set up things with her father and sisters, but Tracy reluctantly agrees for it to go ahead. Poppy is sick after eating too much and Rosie hits Steve with the swing accidentally. Christie is furious with Tracy when she learns Rosie and Poppy met Steve. After realising her sisters are settled with the Perrys, Lily tells her father he does not have to get Rosie and Poppy back.

=== Poppy Kettle ===
Poppy Kettle
- Tracy Beaker character
- Portrayed by: Katie Anderson
- Duration: 2010–2012
- First appearance: Full Circle; 8 January 2010
- Last appearance: "Belonging"; 27 January 2012
- Introduced by: Josephine Ward
In-universe information
- Father: Steve Kettle
- Adoptive father: Matt Perry (foster)
- Adoptive mother: Christie Perry (foster)
- Stepmother: Shannay
- Sisters: Lily Kettle; Rosie Kettle
- Half-brothers: Jonah Kettle

Poppy Kettle, portrayed by Katie Anderson, made her first appearance on 8 January 2010 in series 1 of Tracy Beaker Returns during the episode "Full Circle". She departed in series 3 during the episode "Belonging".

When Carmen (Amy-Leigh Hickman) moves into Lily's (Jessie Williams) bedroom, Lily is hurt when Carmen takes over with Poppy and Rosie Kettle (Claudia Colling). Lily falls out with Carmen she unintentionally upsets Rosie by putting sparkles in her hair; however, they later make up.

Poppy is fostered with Lily and Rosie by Matt (Chris Robson) and Christie (Vicky Hall). When Lily is returned to The Dumping Ground after arguing with Matt and Christie about who is in charge of Poppy and Rosie, Tracy (Dani Harmer) takes Lily back to the Perry's to apologise. However, Poppy and Rosie get upset when Lily argues with Matt and Christie. On a visit to the Perry's, Christie announces to Lily that she can move back in, which pleases Poppy and Rosie; however, Lily does not seem enthusiastic.

With Lily living with him, Poppy and Rosie meet their father, Steve (Ben Cartwright), as he is hoping to get them back. However, the meeting does not go well and Poppy and Rosie run out crying. Lily decides to organise a meeting between her father and sisters in the park and she lies to Tracy about the park when she asks her to ask Christie to bring her sisters over. Tracy is not thrilled when she discovers Lily set up things with her father and sisters, but Tracy reluctantly agrees for it to proceed. Poppy is sick after over-eating and Rosie accidentally hits Steve with the swing. Christie is furious with Tracy when she learns Poppy and Rosie met Steve. After realising her sisters are settled with the Perry's, Lily tells her father he does not have to get Poppy and Rosie back.

=== Toby Coleman ===
Toby Coleman
- Tracy Beaker character
- Portrayed by: John Bell
- Duration: 2010–2011
- First appearance: Full Circle; 8 January 2010
- Last appearance: "Chain Reaction"; 25 March 2011
- Introduced by: Josephine Ward
In-universe information
- Occupation: Student
- Uncles: Andrew
- Aunts: Sandra

Toby Coleman is a resident of Elm Tree House throughout the first two series of "Tracy Beaker Returns", who made his first appearance in the first series of Tracy Beaker Returns. He is played by actor John Bell. He was put into care after his parents died in a car crash. Toby blamed himself for his parents' death, as he said he shouted at them and called them names before they walked out to go for a drive to cool down a bit. Toby was fostered at one point but his foster mother was killed, Mike described it like "lightning striking twice". Because of these events, Toby has always been convinced he's cursed. Throughout his stay at the Dumping Ground, he proves to be a loyal friend and is usually a source of calm at the residence. He is best friends with Johnny and gets along with the older residents like Liam, Frank and Elektra. Toby also seemed to have a crush on Elektra. But that was never developed as the actor did not come back to play his role as Toby for the third series, John Bell moved on to other acting roles. Toby is very into his comics and sci-fi things. As he has numerous comic collections and has many sci-fi related stuff in his bedroom. You can also see a Doctor Who poster in his bedroom that has the Tenth Doctor (David Tennant) featured on it. This was probably a small Easter egg, as John Bell's first acting job was in Doctor Who in 2007, in the episode "Utopia".

Series 1 (TBR)
In Bad Luck Boy, Toby is convinced that his life is jinxed, inspiring Tracy to write a funny column called "Bad Luck Boy" commenting on his bad luck. He becomes the butt of everyone's jokes. When Tracy finds out from Sapphire that Toby's parents died in a car crash, as well as his foster parents, Tracy sets about making amends before he meets another set of prospective foster parents. When Toby sees the new foster parents' car arrive, Toby decides to run away because he is afraid of his bad luck. Tracy eventually finds him in the garden. Toby is upset because he does not want foster parents but wants his own parents instead. Toby is worried that his bad luck will strike again. Tracy convinces Toby to go back to the Dumping Ground to meet the foster parents but decides that he does not wish to get fostered. In By the Book, Toby saves Tee from getting injured when she falls out the tree in the garden she got stuck in after climbing it. Toby threw some beanbags below Tee to cushion her fall. Luckily it worked and Tee was unhurt. In Anarchy in the DG, Toby becomes convinced and extremely paranoid that Mike has got Ebola. Sapphire said it to Toby as a joke, but Toby took it seriously and resorted to drastic measures. Tracy became quite annoyed with Toby in this episode. In Sisters, Toby was not happy when Tee adopted a pet sheep, as he was worried about all sorts of diseases that it may contain. He also was not happy that Tee and Carmen seemed to be treating the sheep like she was a toy. In Good Luck Boy, Toby, Johnny, Liam and Frank are scammed into thinking they'd won a free holiday in Florida. The free holiday was true, but the scam was that the company "Sunscreen Holidays" had charged them for the plane tickets. Luckily they got a refund when Toby had proved that one of their workers Terri Fender had allowed an 11-year-old boy to take part in a competition, where you had to be 18 or older. in A Day at the Beach, when Mike organised a day at the beach for everyone, Toby decided to take his pet hamster Mr Hamster with him as he felt guilty for leaving him behind.

Series 2 (TBR)
In Crushed, Toby befriends a girl named Sara at a comic book store. He likes her because he realizes that the two have very much in common but when Toby tells her that his parents are still alive, Sara tells Toby that her mother had died. Toby returns to the Dumping Ground realizing everything he owned had been stolen by the others because they believed he was not returning but Liam and Frank decide to help him get his comics back. Toby asks Liam for help about Sara in telling the truth about his parents. Toby gives Sara his old, rare comic book and tells her the truth about his parents, she is hurt by this and runs off home, but when Toby follows her, he discovers that she has been lying all along and that her mother is still alive after which he is frustrated with her but she gives him a kiss on the cheek.

Series 3 (TBR)
It is mentioned by Tracy at the beginning of the third series that Toby has been fostered.

Series 1 (TDG)
Toby was mentioned by Tee when she was showing new resident Mo Michaels, people's stuff in the attic. She mentioned Toby when showing some of his comics that she said he gave to Johnny before he left.

=== Elektra Perkins ===
Elektra Perkins
- Tracy Beaker character
- Portrayed by: Jessica Revell
- Duration: 2011–2013, 2017, 2020
- First appearance: "Elektra"; 4 February 2011
- Last appearance: "Go Your Own Way"; 27 March 2020
- Introduced by: Josephine Ward (2011); Jonathan Phillips (2017, 2018, 2020)
- Spin-off appearances: Tracy Beaker Survival Files (2011–2012); The Dumping Ground Dish Up (2015); After The DG (2018)
In-universe information
- Occupation: Student; Mechanic
- Father: Bernard Perkins
- Mother: Marilyn Perkins
- Sisters: Melissa Valentine

Mandy "Elektra" Perkins was a difficult and rebellious resident of Elm Tree House during the second and third series of "Tracy Beaker Returns" and the first series of The Dumping Ground, and was portrayed by Jessica Revell. Elektra presents herself as a tough young lady who is happy to bully and intimidate people. She is quite mean, sarcastic, and cunning, and while she does have caring moments, and begins friendships with Toby, Carmen and Johnny, she mainly displays her tough, uncaring and mean side. She shows more of her softer side in The Dumping Ground and has friendships with Faith and Rick.

Elektra arrives in Elektra, during the second series, instantly beginning her stay by fighting Liam, later explaining this as a reflex reaction following several tough experiences in other care homes. She begins to form a gang with the other residents, forcing them to commit thefts for her personal gain to test their loyalty to her.

In "A Day in the Country", Elektra is left jilted after Carmen almost dies falling off a bridge due to her actions; she also saves Harry from an adder.

During "Snake Bite", Elektra is reunited with her old gang, the Cobras, although after they try to rob Toby she realises that what they're doing is wrong, and she moves on, leaving the gang behind.

Going Home reveals more about Elektra's character and family background. Elektra's sister, Melissa Perkins, arrives at Elm Tree House in order to ask Elektra to be her bridesmaid. The residents find it amusing that Elektra's real name is Mandy. Melissa breaks the news that she will marry Harvey. The two sisters shop for dresses and Elektra observes through Melissa's behaviour that her mother has a strong influence upon every aspect of the wedding. Elektra is emphatic that she not be forced to change her hair, no matter what her controlling mother dictates. Elektra's mother put Elektra in care despite the fact that Elektra did not want to go into care. Melissa convinces Elektra that both of her parents love her and that they would welcome her if she came to lunch. Tracy accompanies Elektra to lunch with her parents. Although they kicked Elektra out of the house, they have made an effort to see her since. Elektra appears to be pleased that her mother took the time to buy a vegetarian lasagne for her. Her mother seems to think that Elektra has severe behavioural problems and wants to focus upon the wedding whereas Elektra's father at first seems to be more concerned about his daughter's welfare and putting the past behind them. History seems to repeat itself when Elektra's mother assumes control by saying that bridesmaids cannot have blue hair. Elektra becomes infuriated when her mother tells her that she must keep the fact that she resides at a care home a secret from Harvey. Mrs Perkins told Harvey that her daughter was away at a boarding school. Elektra rings the wedding planner in order to cancel the wedding by pretending to be her mother. Melissa comes to the Dumping Ground and gives Elektra a gift, a new pair of white boots for the wedding. Melissa is furious when she discovers that Elektra cancelled the wedding. She states that Elektra does not deserve a family. She also showcases her feelings of resentment when she states that she always had to be the good daughter and that she was not able to attend her own prom because her parents were too busy dealing with Elektra's problems with the police.

Many events during the series, like Elektra's defensive behaviour during Gus's adoption, have led viewers to the idea that she is a lesbian. She also had a Pride flag in her bedroom in the Elm Tree House and a poster with the pride colours on it in her apartment in series 8. It was also confirmed on Twitter by Elly Brewer that Elektra is gay, but never had the chance to explore that part of her storyline, been as Elektra left in between series 1 and 2 of The Dumping Ground. Because the actress Jessica Revell had joined a drama school, but she was told she could not work as an actor while she was attending the school. However, her appearance in After the DG explored this part of her character by having her meet a girl who she ends up dating in the end.

Elektra was seen to appear alongside Sapphire, Frank, Johnny and Lily in a mini-series titled The Dumping Ground Dish Up.

Elektra returned for two episodes in series 5 of The Dumping Ground, along with Frank Matthews, Johnny Taylor and Tee Taylor to try to stop Ashdene Ridge/The Dumping Ground being knocked down she made her last appearance on the 16th Dec 2017 but was on After the DG in 2018.

Elektra returned for one episode of The Dumping Ground, to help Tyler and Jody try to run away together to St Lucia.

=== Rick Barber ===
Rick Barber
- Tracy Beaker character
- Portrayed by: Daniel Pearson
- Duration: 2012–2014
- First appearance: Slow Burn; 6 January 2012
- Last appearance: "Face the Music"; 28 March 2014
- Introduced by: Josephine Ward
- Spin-off appearances: The Dumping Ground Survival Files (2014)
In-universe information
- Father: Gerry Barber

Rick Barber (played by Daniel Pearson) was a resident of Elm Tree House, and later Ashdene Ridge, during the third series of "Tracy Beaker Returns" and the first two series of The Dumping Ground; he went into care when his parents went to prison for fraud. Rick is tall with brown hair and blue eyes. He is nice and intelligent but also hot-headed and moody. He is a very fair character, and has good morals. He finds a friend in Carmen, is naturally protective of Tyler, he plays the guitar and enjoys listening to his parents' old vinyl records, feeling that they are all that is left of the memories he had with them.

Rick expresses a wish for a sibling, but says his parents never had more children as it was impractical in case they needed to pack up and leave suddenly, due to being scammers. When Rick and Carmen become closer, Carmen learns more about Rick's character. He tells Carmen that both of his parents used to con people out of money. Things were good for a while until his parents got sent to prison and Rick ended up in the care home. Rick feels guilty because his parents used to involve him in their scams and this meant that his parents were able to purchase nice things for him. He regrets benefitting from exploiting people.

In "Dreamland" (The Dumping Ground series 1, episode 8), Rick gets a huge shock when he finds his father, disguised as a boiler man, inside the Dumping Ground. Gerry is on leave from prison for a short amount of time and insists that he's above board now and promises Rick a happy family future, but it quickly becomes clear that Gerry still loves the buzz of a hustle, and Rick is distraught.

Rick leaves Ashdene Ridge/the Dumping Ground between the second and third series of The Dumping Ground. Elly Brewer confirmed on Twitter that he moved out of the Dumping Ground to be with his mum once she got out of prison.

=== Tyler Lewis ===
Tyler Lewis
- Tracy Beaker character
- Portrayed by: Miles Butler-Hughton
- Duration: 2012–2020, 2022
- First appearance: Slow Burn; 6 January 2012
- Last appearance: "Breaking Chains"; 25 March 2022
- Introduced by: Josephine Ward
- Spin-off appearances: The Dumping Ground Survival Files (2014); Floss The Foundling (2016)
In-universe information
- Occupation: Student
- Mother: Sally Lewis

Tyler Lewis, portrayed by Miles Butler-Hughton, made his first appearance on 6 January 2012 in series 3 of Tracy Beaker Returns during the episode "Slow Burn: Part 1".

Before Tyler was put into care, he used to live with his mum, Sally. But Sally had bipolar, a mental disorder that causes depression and mood swings. So she was unfit to take care of Tyler. Tyler first lived at Burnywood Children's Home, which is known for being a horrible place to live where many residents get their stuff stolen, or bedroom doors kicked in, or even beaten up. The head care worker, Dennis Stockle, was not the best either. In 2011, when Elm Tree House was closed because of budget cuts from the council, three residents from Elm Tree moved into Burnywood (Sapphire Fox, Carmen Howle and Harry Jones). It is unknown what caused the following event to happen, if Tyler was dared or just chose to do it, but he stole all of Carmen's stuff. When Carmen asked for it back, Tyler punched her and gave her a black eye. This changed Carmen's over-friendly and pushover-like personality, making her less of a softy. While Tyler was at Burnywood, he was close friends with Rick Barber, who kind of looked out for Tyler.

Tracy Beaker Returns: Series 3 In Slow Burn, Carmen recognises him as the young joker whom she blames for nicking her stuff while she was at Burnywood, after he and three other children from Burnywood arrive at Elm Tree House following a fire. They reignite their turbulent relationship. Tyler proves himself to be a prankster; however, he reveals his softer side when he breaks down in tears as he sees the burnt remains of the only birthday card his mother ever gave to him. Him and Carmen call it quits on their feuds and become friends. In shadows, Tyler's prankster side showed a lot after a thunderstorm caused a power cut in the DG. Tracy suggested it was the perfect night to tell ghost stories. While Johnny was telling a ghost story, Tyler continuously kept butting in and ruining it been as he found it laughable and had heard it before. Tyler continued to tease Johnny for the rest of the night, especially after telling a story about an electrician which seemed to scare Johnny a little, but he reluctantly said it did not. When everyone had gone to bed, doors kept opening and closing, and Carmen saw a man come into her bedroom, and she was convinced it was an escaped prisoner that was on the news earlier in the night before the electricity went off. Tracy told everyone to go back to bed and stay in bed, but everyone was later woken up again when Gus started screaming. Someone had been into his room and messed about all his stuff in his room, which he has organised in a special way (as Gus had Asperger syndrome. There was a writing written in one of his notebooks saying "BEWARE THE ELECTRICIAN", everyone blamed Tyler as he had told the ghost story about the electrician, but it was later revealed Johnny was the one causing all the trouble, been as he was angry that Tyler had just arrived at the DG, and humiliated Johnny, and everyone seemed to love Tyler for it. But Johnny swore he was not the one in Carmen's bedroom. The next morning when an electrician came to fix the electric, Johnny and Tyler (who were in the kitchen) heard that a recently escaped prisoner had returned to the police station in the morning, claiming that he had spent the night in a big old house nearby, meaning it was the prisoner who was hiding in the house. Johnny and Tyler went to tell Tracy (who was in the garden with Carmen, Tee and Lily), but decided not to when they saw how unsettled Carmen seemed about it. Tyler then covered up for Johnny, saying it was him in Carmen's room last night. Johnny later asks why Tyler covered up for him after what he did, and Tyler said because it's what you do for your friends. They also end their feud, and become friends. In Big Brother, when Liam and Elektra had an argument, Elektra took revenge by stealing his MP3 player and sold it to Tyler. Later Tyler was listening to the MP3 on the settee, but Liam walked past the living room and saw Tyler with his MP3 Player. Liam went and snatched it off him and pushed over the sofa Tyler was sitting on and also shouted at Tyler for nicking his stuff. Later that day some of the kids went to the cinema to see a film, but Tyler and Elektra stay behind. And decide to get their own back on Liam by moving his entire bedroom into the back garden. In Eggs, when the kids want Mike to buy them a new computer, Mike does not agree to it as he feels he cannot trust them with stuff as they have history of breaking things, like Carmen throwing a games remote out the window by accident, Johnny and Elektra using snooker cues as ninja sticks, and Tyler's second-hand bike nicked. Tracy suggest for them to set the kids a task of them looking after an egg for a day, to see if they can go a whole day looking after an egg without it breaking, as it is a delicate object. Tyler is paired with Gus, and annoys Gus as Tyler is the complete opposite to Gus. Tyler and Gus not getting on, causes Gus to break the egg by accident by slamming the piano shut. Everyone else break their eggs too, but Elektra and Johnny decide to buy new eggs from the shops and hope Tracy does not notice. But what they did not know was that Tracy drew pencil marks on the eggs, so she'd know if they broke and replaced the eggs or not. So in the end, Mike does not get them a new computer. During that episode, Rick moved back into the Dumping Ground after being fostered, and it not working out due to Rick being agitated by his foster brother. In Justine Littlewood Returns, Tyler sided with Justine shortly when she returned and made Tracy's life just as hard as she made it when they were kids living in the Dumping Ground. In Reward, when Johnny was angry at Tracy when he overheard that she could not think of anything good besides good at cleaning at an annual awards for kids in care. Him and Elektra decided to distract Tracy, and edit the certificates to everyone by telling everyone what Mike, Gina and Tracy really think of the kids by reading everyone's files. Carmen is described as needy, weedy and greedy for attention. Tracy then comes in to find Johnny and Elektra reading out their versions of certificates, she tells them to stop but Johnny decides to read out Tyler's "award" for wetting the bed all the time. Johnny and Elektra find this amusing, but Tyler gets upset, pushes Johnny and storms off to his room. Tracy and Rick try to convince Tyler that it's not a big deal, and that everyone at some point in their life has wet the bed. When Tyler comes back downstairs, Gus starts asking everyone if they have wet the bed. When he asks Rick, Rick says it's Tyler's fault. Because when Tyler and Rick first moved into the Dumping Ground, Rick found out Tyler wets the bed. So Tyler decided to make Rick wet the bed one night by putting his hand in a bucket of cold water in the night, that can cause you to wet the bed and would threaten to tell everyone Rick wets the bed, if Rick said anything to anyone about Tyler wetting the bed. Rick then goes on to say that he would not have said anything in the first place. Before everyone set off to go to the awards, Tee apologised to Tyler about Johnny's behaviour towards Tyler. Tyler told Tee and Harry about the dream he always has before he wets the bed; and that he's with his mum, saying that she wishes a big wave would come and wash all the bad stuff away. Tyler thinks that she meant that a big wave would come and wash him away too, and then there's a big wave coming towards him really fast. Then he wakes up and he's wet the bed. Later after the awards ceremony, Johnny apologises to Tyler himself and Tyler forgives him. Harry then comes and suggests to Tyler that in his dream before the big wave comes that makes him wet the bed, that he should build a boat so he does not get wet. When he goes to bed and has the dream, he dreams he built a boat so he does not get washed away and then he wakes up and finds that he has not wet the bed. Tyler then decides to get his own back on Johnny for making fun of him for wetting the bed, by putting a bucket of cold water by his (Johnny's) bed and putting his hand in the water so he would wet the bed. The episode ended there so we did not get to see Johnny's reaction to Tyler's prank.

In Summer Holiday, Tyler joined everyone else ignoring and teasing Tee about losing their holiday, by leaving a gate open on the farm they were staying at causing sheep to escape and trash the house they were staying in. Getting them banned from the farmer's farm and losing their holiday. When everyone had to return to the Dumping Ground, in boredom Tyler and Harry decided to squirt water at Rick with water guns, Rick chases them and picks up a bag of flour to throw at them. But Gina comes in to see what all the noise is about, and unluckily gets hit by the flour bag thrown by Rick. Tyler and Rick are punished, by being made to clean up the mess they made in the kitchen, while Harry manages to sneak off away from the scene. Later, Tyler and everyone else forgive Tee and apologise for being mean to her when Tee manages to find a new holiday for everyone.

In series two of The Dumping Ground, Tyler's mum decides to visit but Tyler then discovers she is not taking her medication for her bipolar disorder, so he gets angry, but eventually they reconcile.

Tyler was put in care because his mother was ill so she could not look after him properly. Tyler does not know his father but in one episode, "Baby", Tyler scams Johnny into thinking his father is a billionaire. In series 8 episode 7 of The Dumping Ground, Kamal (Tyler's stepfather) tells Tyler that his real father has died. This episode also reveals that Tyler's father went abroad after Tyler was born and even though he moved back nearby, he never saw his father.

In the series 8 episode "Go Your Own Way", Tyler moves out of the Dumping Ground to St Lucia to be with his mother and Kamal.

However, in the final episode of series 9, "Breaking Chains", Tyler temporarily returned to the Dumping Ground to support Jody for her brother Kingsley's funeral.

=== Jody Jackson ===
Jody Jackson
- Tracy Beaker character
- Portrayed by: Kia Pegg
- Duration: 2012–2022, 2026
- First appearance: "Jody Jackson"; 9 March 2012
- Introduced by: Josephine Ward
- Spin-off appearances: The Dumping Ground Survival Files (2014)
In-universe information
- Occupation: Student
- Mother: Denise Jackson
- Brothers: Kingsley Jackson; Luke Jackson

Jody Jackson, portrayed by Kia Pegg, made her first appearance on 9 March 2012 in series 3 of Tracy Beaker Returns during the episode "Jody Jackson".

During her first appearance, she is portrayed as being like a tramp, having lived in squalor; she is dressed in simple clothes and smells terrible – this means Carmen develops a low opinion of her before she discovers she is sharing with her. Carmen immediately resents and is unsympathetic to Jody and feels that her presence is intrusive.

When she reveals she is afraid to take a bath, Tracy entices her with bath jelly, which Jody seems to like. Jody tells Tracy that her mother used to scrub her with a scrubbing brush, only when the Social Worker attended. She also reveals that when she was naughty, people used to hold her under the water. Jody borrows a cardigan from Carmen. Elektra responds by locking Jody in the toy cupboard. Jody manages to escape by knocking out one of the wood panels from the door. Jody then disappears and Tracy thinks that Jody might have gone to her old home, where Jody used to live with her mother and Jody's brothers. Mike and Tracy arrive to find the place vacant, except for Jody. Carmen shows compassion towards Jody later on in the episode. Later in the night, Carmen, Gus and Gina discover Jody sleeping under the kitchen table. Jody says that she was scared to sleep in a room with another person. A very sympathetic Gina offers to make up a bed for Jody in the quiet room. The episode concludes with Elektra and Sapphire sharing a room so that Jody can have a room of her own.

In Goodbye Tracy Beaker, new careworker Melanie saves Jody's life when Jody goes into anaphylactic shock.

In "Jody in Wonderland", Jody's dilemma over having to give a witness statement against her brother Kingsley propels her into a Wonderland-esque world full of bubbly characters – her experiences in Wonderland eventually make her realise that she needs to testify against her brother.

Jody was put into care because she was found alone in her house. It is later revealed that her big brother, Kingsley, used to abuse her and her mother did not care. It does not say anything about her father so we do not know anything about him.

She nearly joined Tyler in St Lucia in series 8 episode 12, "Go Your Own Way", but she stayed behind while seeing Tyler going by himself.

As she is a character with anger issues. In series 6 episode 12, she goes with May-li to the gym to box which calms her anger down. She also takes anger management sessions, which happened in series 9 episode 2.

In the series 9 finale, Jody finds out that Kingsley died in a car accident. Despite his abusive ways, Jody decides to give him a proper funeral but she struggles with memories of his abuse and her feelings towards Kingsley. With Tyler's help, he is able to help her come to terms with what Kingsley did.

Between series 9 and series 10, Jody moves out of Ashdene Ridge and has her own flat through supported living. She struggles with living on her own and when she hears of new kids moving into the care home, she goes back to visit and tries to help Bonnie settle in. When Bonnie brings up the idea for Jody to move back and share her room with Bonnie, Jody is upset when May-Li tells her that she cannot come back. In the process, she ends up revealing a secret about Bonnie (Bonnie tried to pull a prank and she thought it caused Bridley Hill to be destroyed) to the other kids.

The next morning, Jody learns that Bonnie, Sabrina, Fraser, and Wes all ran away the night before. Feeling guilty, Jody leads Candi-Rose and Bird on a search for the kids and helps to rescue Bonnie when she falls down a hole. After getting the kids back safely, Jody realizes that while she loves being at the Dumping Ground, it's time for her to move on and leaves for good.

== Guest characters ==
=== Christie Perry ===
Christie Perry
- Tracy Beaker Returns character
- Portrayed by: Vicky Hall
- Duration: 2010–2012
- First appearance: "Family Values"; 29 January 2010
- Last appearance: "Belonging"; 27 January 2012
- Introduced by: Josephine Ward
In-universe information
- Husband: Matt Perry
- Adoptive daughters: Lily Kettle (foster); Rosie Kettle (foster); Poppy Kettle (foster)

Christie Perry, portrayed by Vicky Hall, made her first appearance on 29 January 2010 in series 1 of Tracy Beaker Returns during the episode "Family Values". She departed in series 3 during the episode "Belonging".

Christie and her husband, Matt (Chris Robson) foster Lily (Jessie Williams), Rosie (Claudia Colling & Millie Redfearn) and Poppy (Katie Anderson). Lily is returned to The Dumping Ground when things do not work out between her, Christie and Matt. When Gus (Noah Marullo) has an audition, Tracy (Dani Harmer) brings Lily along and stops off at the Perry's. Tracy asks Christie to give Lily a chance, but Christie says it has to go through Rob (Neil Armstrong). When Tracy notices the Perry's set up a picnic in the garden with Rosie and Poppy, she fetches Lily from the cab and she tells Lily to say sorry to Christie and Matt. Lily ends up arguing with Christie and Matt when they have given Poppy a tuna sandwich, something Poppy did not like and Christie and Matt take the girls inside.

When Lily stays with Christie and Matt, Christie tells Lily that she and Matt have decided she can move in and Lily pretends to be excited when she is actually scared about ruining things for her sisters. Christie gives Lily a sign to go on her door, which Matt made; however, her name is spelled "Lilly", but Lily insists it's fine. With the residents and staff protesting about the council closing The Dumping Ground, Christie asks Mike if she can take Lily home with her, promising to bring her back when it all calms down. Carmen (Amy-Leigh Hickman) asks Christie if she can stay with them, but Christie says she is there to collect Lily. When Lily hears Christie's voice, Lily climbs onto the roof and she tells Tracy her fears and Tracy promises they can slow things down and tells Lily to go indoors, but Lily falls off the roof.

Christie and Matt bring Rosie and Poppy to The Dumping Ground as their father, Steve (Ben Cartwright), wants to try to get Rosie and Poppy back. Rosie and Poppy run out of the meeting back to Christie and Matt. In the meeting afterwards, Christie believes that she will not be able to convince Rosie and Poppy to go through it again and she would put a stop to it. Lily asks Tracy if she can arrange for Christie to bring her sisters over so she can see them before they go on holiday and Christie agrees. When Christie finds out Tracy will be supervising, she is not keen on the girls going, but Lily persuades Christie. At the park, they are greeted by Steve and Tracy finds out that Lily planned it. When Rosie and Poppy return to The Dumping Ground, Rosie tells Christie they saw Steve and Christie is angry with Tracy. Lily realises that her sisters are settled with Christie and Matt and she tells her father that he does not have to get Rosie and Poppy back.

=== Matt Perry ===
Matt Perry
- Tracy Beaker Returns character
- Portrayed by: Chris Robson
- Duration: 2010–2012
- First appearance: "Family Values"; 29 January 2010
- Last appearance: "Belonging"; 27 January 2012
- Introduced by: Josephine Ward
In-universe information
- Wife: Christie Perry
- Adoptive daughters: Lily Kettle (foster); Rosie Kettle (foster); Poppy Kettle (foster)

Matt Perry, portrayed by Chris Robson, made his first appearance on 29 January 2010 in series 1 of Tracy Beaker Returns during the episode "Family Values". He departed in series 3 during the episode "Belonging".

Matt and his wife, Christie (Vicky Hall) foster Lily (Jessie Williams), Rosie (Claudia Colling & Millie Redfearn) and Poppy (Katie Anderson). Lily is returned to The Dumping Ground when things do not work out between her, Matt and Christie. When Gus (Noah Marullo) has an audition, Tracy (Dani Harmer) brings Lily along and stops off at the Perry's. When Tracy notices the Perry's set up a picnic in the garden with Rosie and Poppy, she fetches Lily from the cab and she tells Lily to say sorry to Matt and Christie. Lily ends up arguing with Matt and Christie when they have given Poppy a tuna sandwich, something Poppy did not like and Matt and Christie take the girls inside.

When Lily stays with Matt and Christie, Christie tells Lily that she and Matt have decided she can move in and Lily pretends to be excited when she is actually scared about ruining things for her sisters. Christie gives Lily a sign to go on her door, which Matt made; however, her name is spelled "Lilly", but Lily insists it's fine.

Matt and Christie bring Rosie and Poppy to The Dumping Ground as their father, Steve (Ben Cartwright), wants to try to get Rosie and Poppy back. Rosie and Poppy run out of the meeting back to Matt and Christie. Lily realises that her sisters are settled with Christie and Matt and she tells her father that he does not have to get Rosie and Poppy back.

=== Rob ===
Rob
- Tracy Beaker Returns and The Dumping Ground character
- Portrayed by: Neil Armstrong
- Duration: 2010–2013
- First appearance: "Sisters"; 19 February 2010
- Last appearance: "S.O.S."; 18 January 2013
- Introduced by: Josephine Ward
In-universe information
- Occupation: Social Worker

Rob, portrayed Neil Armstrong, made his first appearance on 25 February 2011 in series 1 of Tracy Beaker Returns during the episode "Sisters". He departed in series 1 of The Dumping Ground during the episode "S.O.S.".

When Lily's (Jessie Williams) foster placement breaks down with Matt (Chris Robson) and Christie (Vicky Hall), Rob brings her back to The Dumping Ground. Later, Rob is furious with Tracy (Dani Harmer) when she took Lily to the Perry's to apologise, but the situation inflamed when Lily had an argument with Matt and Christie. Christie and Matt bring Rosie (Millie Redfearn) and Poppy (Katie Anderson) to The Dumping Ground as their father, Steve (Ben Cartwright), wants to try to get Rosie and Poppy back and the contact is a disaster when Poppy and Rosie run out. Rob tells Christie, Tracy, Mike (Connor Byrne) and Gina (Kay Purcell) that Steve struggled and could not find common ground. Christie is not keen on Poppy and Rosie going through it all again, but Rob reminds Christie that Steve is their father.

When Jody (Kia Pegg) runs away from her mum's and comes back to The Dumping Ground. Jody is not keen on going home and Rob asks Jody if she wants to talk to him on her own, but Jody says she is OK and has nothing to say. Gina does not think it's wise for Jody to go home, but Rob tells her that it's the best place for Jody with the support of social services.

=== Seth Foreman ===
Seth Foreman
- Tracy Beaker series character
- Portrayed by: Ashley Taylor-Rhys
- Duration: 2011–2012
- First appearance: "Money"; 28 January 2011
- Last appearance: "Goodbye, Tracy Beaker"; 23 March 2012
- Introduced by: Josephine Ward
In-universe information
- Occupation: Social worker Band member

Seth Foreman is played by Ashley Taylor-Rhys and was Toby's social worker, and later Tracy's boyfriend, during Tracy Beaker Returns second and third series. Seth is tall and mixed race and has brown eyes. He is kind and humorous, and likes Tracy a lot: they eventually begin a turbulent relationship.

When a bag of money is found mysteriously in the garden, Toby immediately points the finger at Seth who is a new social worker. Seth then begins to act strangely towards Toby. Liam and Frank decide to spend their share of the money on a new television but end up running from security. Two police officers arrive at the Dumping Ground to search for the money but after searching the garden, the police officers find no trace of the money. Toby tells Johnny that he thinks that Seth is looking for the money and he wants it back, so Toby decides to follow Seth around and spy on him to get some evidence that he has stolen the money, when Seth leaves the room, Toby steals Seth's phone and Gus tells Tracy to meet Toby in the toy cupboard without telling Seth. Toby tells Tracy that Seth has text messages on his phone regarding to the money and Toby then shows Tracy the money but Tracy then witnesses Seth telling Toby to give his "stolen property" back and she pushes him onto the floor and they lock him in the basement. Carmen and Lily tease Tracy about crushing on Seth. At the end he decides to quit and asks Tracy to tour with him. After Tracy declines this offer, she kisses Seth.

In Justine Littlewood Returns, Tracy tells everyone that Seth is now her boyfriend. When Seth discovers that this was just a ruse to make Justine jealous, he becomes cross with Tracy and tells her that she needs to figure out what she wants. She later finds out that she wants to be with Seth. Seth returns in Goodbye Tracy Beaker to say how proud he is of Tracy.

=== Steve Kettle ===
Steve Kettle
- Tracy Beaker Returns and The Dumping Ground character
- Portrayed by: Ben Cartwright
- Duration: 2011–2013
- First appearance: "The Scare Game"; 25 February 2011
- Last appearance: "Seriously Funny"; 8 March 2013
- Introduced by: Josephine Ward
In-universe information
- Spouse: Shannay
- Sons: Jonah Kettle
- Daughters: Lily Kettle; Rosie Kettle; Poppy Kettle

Steve Kettle, portrayed by Ben Cartwright, made his first appearance on 25 February 2011 in series 2 of Tracy Beaker Returns during the episode "The Scare Game". He departed in series 1 of The Dumping Ground during the episode "Seriously Funny".

Steve approaches Lily (Jessie Williams) in a shopping centre and Lily's foster sister, Tracy (Dani Harmer) witnesses the situation and thinks he is trying to abduct Lily, but Lily reveals he is her father. With the help of Sapphire (Saffron Coomber), Lily tracks Steve down at a local AA meeting, but Lily is left devastated when Steve tells her he is just saying sorry to people and he cannot be her father. Lily goes to her father's B&B, Lily asks him why he disappeared when she and her sisters got put into care and Lily accuses him of being selfish and Sapphire soon takes her away. Lily returns to her father's B&B and she apologises for what she said. He lets her in and Lily gives him some clothes he bought with her foster mother's, Cam (Lisa Coleman), money, but she pretends it's hers. Tracy goes to pick up Lily when she finds out where she is from Sapphire. Lily wants to live with Steve, so Steve arranges to meet her; however, he tells Cam, Tracy (Dani Harmer) and Mike where she is and they collect her. Steve arrives at the Dumping Ground and tells them that he intends to apply to get the court order lifted.

Steve has a contact with Rosie (Millie Redfearn), Poppy (Katie Anderson) as he plans to get them back; however, the meeting is a disaster when Poppy and Rosie run out of the meeting to their foster parents, Matt (Chris Robson) and Christie (Vicky Hall). Lily asks Tracy if she can arrange for Christie to bring her sisters over so she can see them before they go on holiday and Christie agrees. Lily tells her father that their social worker, Rob (Neil Armstrong), said he can have another chance with Poppy and Rosie. At the park, they are greeted by Steve and Tracy finds out that Lily planned it. Poppy is sick when she eats too many sweets and Steve is hit by a swing when he is distracted. When Rosie and Poppy return to The Dumping Ground, Rosie tells Christie they saw Steve and Christie is angry with Tracy. Rob visits Steve with the news that a meeting is going to be held, which could set Steve back. Lily realises that her sisters are settled with Christie and Matt and she tells her father that he does not have to get Rosie and Poppy back.

Lily is unhappy when Steve's pregnant girlfriend, Shannay (Holly Quin-Ankrah) moves in and Lily goes to The Dumping Ground. Steve visits to talk to Lily with Shannay and an angry Lily asks Steve and Shannay why they cannot have the new baby adopted. Lily feels guilty when Shannay goes into labour, but is happy when she learns that she has a brother. When Lily goes back home, Steve is upset as Shannay has left; however, Lily persuades Shannay to give things a chance. Lily organises an unsupervised sleepover with Carmen (Amy-Leigh Hickman) and Tee (Mia McKenna-Bruce) by persuading her parents to let her stay at the Dumping Ground when they go and visit Shannay's sister.

=== Jack O'Donovan ===
Jack O'Donovan
- Tracy Beaker Returns and The Dumping Ground character
- Portrayed by: Callum Callaghan (2012); Chris Finch (2014)
- Duration: 2012, 2014
- First appearance: "Big Brother"; 20 January 2012
- Last appearance: "Face The Music"; 28 March 2014
- Introduced by: Josephine Ward (2012); Lis Steele (2014)
In-universe information
- Occupation: Police Officer
- Brothers: Liam O'Donovan

Jack O'Donovan, portrayed by Callum Callaghan in 2012 and Chris Finch in 2014, made his first appearance on 20 January 2012 in series 2 of Tracy Beaker Returns during the episode "Big Brother". He departed in series 2 of The Dumping Ground during the episode "Face the Music".

Liam O'Donovan returns a DVD to Jack after he finds out it's a pirate DVD. Liam is arrested for supposedly taking an eoman's bag. At the court, Jack found out about them being brothers, and sends him a letter. At first, Liam is in shock, but when he confronts him, he is arrested for breaking curfew. At the police station, Jack reveals that he is actually an undercover police officer trying to find a counterfeit DVD making gang. He invites Liam to come and live with him, and Liam agrees.

Nicky (Lu Corfield) is robbed by a stranger and Johnny discreetly takes a photo of the mugger. Jack visits The Dumping Ground to take a statement from Johnny and he tells Mike (Connor Byrne) that he is having problems with Liam. When Liam leaves home after an argument with Jack, Jack goes to The Dumping Ground and makes up with Liam.

== Others ==
Series 1 (2010)
Character	Date(s)	Actor	Circumstances
Sgt Nelson	8 January 2010-12 February 2010	Jim Kitson	When Tracy (Dani Harmer) uses Cam's (Lisa Coleman) credit card in order to publish her book, it leaves Cam £6,000 in debt. She is arrested by a police officer (Charlie Binns) and Sgt Nelson questions her at the station. Sgt Nelson contacts Cam and they both agree to drop the charges against Tracy as Cam never wanted her to get arrested on the conditions that Tracy repays Cam and she writes a weekly article. After Liam (Richard Wisker) pulls a scam at the launderette and turns a man's washing pink, the police officer arrests Liam and takes him to see Sgt Nelson. realises that Sapphire's (Saffron Coomber) boyfriend, Ferris (Peter Losasso), has got her hiding stolen goods in her bedroom, she summons Sgt Nelson to The Dumping Ground to talk about her column. Ferris is tricked by Tracy when ends up in the same room as Sgt Nelson and the stolen goods and he begins to blame Sapphire and when Sapphire finds out, she blames Ferris. Sapphire realises that Tracy did not tell on her and Sgt Nelson arrests Ferris when Ferris takes the blame.
Police Officer	8 January 2010	Unknown Actress	When Tracy (Dani Harmer) uses Cam's (Lisa Coleman) credit card in order to publish her book, it leaves Cam £6,000 in debt. She is arrested by the police officer and Sgt Nelson (Jim Kitson) questions her at the station. After Liam (Richard Wisker) pulls a scam at the launderette and turns a man's washing pink, the police officer arrests Liam and takes him to see Sgt Nelson.
Presenter	8 January 2010	Sarah Lawton	The presenter who interviews Tracy (Dani Harmer) for the telly when Tracy has published her own book.
Mr Scott	15 January 2010	Richard Stacey	Mr and Mrs Scott are potential foster parents for Toby (John Bell). Toby decides that he does not want to be fostered by Mr and Mrs Scott.
Mrs Scott	15 January 2010	Joanne Bowden	Mr and Mrs Scott are potential foster parents for Toby (John Bell). Toby decides that he does not want to be fostered by Mr and Mrs Scott.
WI Lady	5 February 2010	Sue Bowmer	Liam (Richard Wisker) and Frank (Chris Slater) go to houses to sell pizza and the WI Lady pays £10 for a slice of pizza when Liam and Frank tell her it's to save The Dumping Ground. The vested man is annoyed with Liam and Frank waking him up. He drags Liam and Frank back to The Dumping Ground and when he threatens to get the police involved Tracy (Dani Harmer) says he should tell them about him dragging a boy with cerebral palsy through the streets.
Vested Man	5 February 2010	Steven Osborne	Liam (Richard Wisker) and Frank (Chris Slater) go to houses to sell pizza and the WI Lady pays £10 for a slice of pizza when Liam and Frank tell her it's to save The Dumping Ground. The vested man is annoyed with Liam and Frank waking him up. He drags Liam and Frank back to The Dumping Ground and when he threatens to get the police involved Tracy (Dani Harmer) says he should tell them about him dragging a boy with cerebral palsy through the streets.
Ferris Lloyd	12 February 2010	Peter Losasso	Ferris Lloyd is the boyfriend of Sapphire (Saffron Coomber). When Tracy (Dani Harmer) finds out Sapphire has got her hiding stolen goods in her bedroom, she tries to keep an eye on Sapphire. Tracy invites Ferris for tea and she summons Sgt Nelson to The Dumping Ground to talk about her column. Ferris is tricked by Tracy when ends up in the same room as Sgt Nelson and the stolen goods and he begins to blame Sapphire and when Sapphire finds out, she blames Ferris. Sapphire realises that Tracy did not tell on her and Sgt Nelson arrests Ferris when Ferris takes the blame.
Cabbie	19 February 2010	Ian McLaughlin	The cabbie who takes Gus (Noah Marullo) to his audition. Tracy (Dani Harmer) brings Lily (Jessie Williams) along and gets the cabbie to stop at Matt (Chris Robson) and Christie's (Vicky Hall) house for Lily to apologise. When Gus arrives at his audition, he believes he is too late and insists on going home.
Terrie Fender	26 February 2010	Tracy-Ann Oberman	When Toby (John Bell), Johnny (Joe Maw), Liam (Richard Wisker) and Frank (Chris Slater) enter a competition to win a holiday. When Terrie visits The Dumping Ground to collect details for the holiday, they lie that they are a family, but Terrie susses out that they live in care. Terrie agrees they can have the holiday if they get permission from an adult; however, the boys fill out the form themselves and they get Gus (Noah Marullo) to help with Mike's (Connor Byrne) details. Terrie spots the boys filling in the form and when she confirms the holiday, Toby finds out she's charged £5,000 on Mike's credit card. The boys go to the Sunscreen Holidays office and Liam insists Terrie gives Mike his money back, but Terrie refuses. To distract Terrie, they set off her car alarm and while Terrie confronts Liam and Johnny, Frank and Toby sneak in. Frank and Toby go on Terrie's laptop to cancel the holiday; however, Terrie catches them, but Toby takes a USB stick. Terrie arrives at the Dumping Ground and she insists they give her the USB stick back as it has important information, but Toby refuses unless she gives Mike his money back. When Tracy (Dani Harmer) tells Terrie she has conned a bunch of kids, Terrie says that they told her they were over 18; however, Toby plays the automated message and they do not confirm their age. Terrie agrees to cancel the transaction and give Mike his money back.
Helen Howle	5 March 2010	Fiona Wade	Helen is the mother of Carmen (Amy-Leigh Hickman), who turns up unexpectedly at the Dumping Ground to see Carmen and Tracy (Dani Harmer) invites her in after thinking she has permission. Carmen is unhappy with her presence and she runs off upstairs. Mike (Connor Byrne) later tells Carmen that her social worker says it's OK for her mum to visit, but Carmen does not want to see her. Carmen later changes her mind and she spends the day with her mum with Tracy shadowing them. Helen then invites Carmen to live with her in Spain and after talking about it with Mike and social services, Mike tells Carmen she can spend a short trial period in Spain to see how things go. Helen tells Carmen that whatever choice she makes, she will support her. Helen gets back together with her ex-boyfriend, Lee and she lets Carmen down again when she says Carmen cannot live with her straight away. Tracy gives Helen an earful about how she puts herself first and how amazing it was that Carmen was prepared to give her a second chance.
Riff	12 March 2010	Jordan Hill	Riff is the half-brother of Sapphire Fox (Saffron Coomber). When he arrives at the Dumping Ground, he hides in the bushes and Carmen is convinced there is a werewolf. Late at night, Riff makes it inside and sleeps in Sapphire's room. Riff explains to Sapphire that he wants to find their father and he asks Sapphire if she knows where he is. Lily (Jessie Williams) and Tee (Mia McKenna-Bruce) spot Riff with Sapphire and Riff gives Lily and Tee an MP3 player for them to keep quiet about him. Riff later plays a game of Guitar Heroes and when Riff scrolls through the song list, Sapphire notices the band that their father is in and tells Riff. When Mike (Connor Byrne), Tracy (Dani Harmer) and Gina (Kay Purcell) find out about Riff's presence, Mike tells Riff that he will contact Social Services from up north. Riff and Sapphire plan to run away to their father, but Tracy catches up with them and Sapphire says that being in care is not all that bad. When Riff leaves, he gives Sapphire his mobile phone as he has two more.
Service Station Manager	19 March 2010	Peter Gunn	On the way to the beach, the kids and staff stop off at a service station. When Carmen (Amy-Leigh Hickman) and Tee (Mia McKenna-Bruce) play with some inflatable beach toys, he asks them if they are going to buy anything. Carmen accidentally knocks down a sweet stand with an inflatable seahorse, angering the service station manager. Tracy (Dani Harmer) finds Lily (Jessie Williams) who is struggling to enjoy herself without her sisters and Tracy gives Lily some sweets. The service station manager asks Tracy if she paid for the sweets. He later receives a complaint from a customer, who had his car soaked by Liam (Richard Wisker) and Frank (Chris Slater). After ending up back home, everyone sets off to the beach again and they stop off at the same service station. The service station manager refuses to let them use the cafe, but he is persuaded by Tee and he warns them to behave. When Toby loses his hamster, chaos is caused when Liam announces to the customers that who ever find it can have a sat nav and the service station manager orders them to leave.
Newspaper Editor	26 March 2010	Ingrid Lacey	A newspaper editor who offers Tracy (Dani Harmer) a job as a junior reporter. She sets Tracy a test article by writing about the kids she works with on life from their point of view. When Tracy gives her the article, she is impressed; however, Tracy decides not to take the job.

Series 2 (2011)
Character	Date(s)	Actor	Circumstances
Leanne Spinks	7 January 2011	Clare Cathcart	After Lily (Jessie Williams) falls off the roof, Leanne Spinks is sent to The Dumping Ground from the council to conduct a full investigation and she tells the children that they will be sent elsewhere while the investigation happens. When the kids lock themselves in the cellar, they refuse to come out and Leanne threatens to phone the police; however, Sapphire (Saffron Coomber) manages to convince them. When The Dumping Ground is reopened, Leanne does her report. She is part of the panel when Mike (Connor Byrne) has to explain why he let Tracy (Dani Harmer) continue with her protest. Mike's job is safe when the panel find in his favour.
Council Official	7 January 2011	Shaun Prendergast	When The Dumping Ground residents do a protest to prevent the council closing The Dumping Ground, it gets media interest and the Council Official arrives to tell Mike (Connor Byrne) to stop the protest. He is part of the panel when Mike has to explain why he let Tracy (Dani Harmer) continue with her protest.
Sara	14 January 2011	Romy Irving	Sara is a girl, who Toby (John Bell) has a crush on. When Sara comments that she saw Toby with his mother, Toby lies about his family and Sara lies that her mum is not around any more and she died. In the comic shop, Sara picks up a classic comic and Toby says he has it and offers to lend it Sara.
Comic Shop Owner	14 January 2011	Wayne Cater	After assuming Toby (John Bell) is not returning to The Dumping Ground, the residents help themselves to his things. Liam (Richard Wisker) sells Toby's comic. When Toby notices one of his comics in the comic store, he asks the owner where he got it and he realises that all of his comics have been sold to him.
Foster Mum	14 January 2011	Zoe Lambert	The foster mum who looks after Toby (John Bell) when The Dumping Ground was temporarily closed.
Sara's Mum	14 January 2011	Phillippa Wilson	The mother of Sara (Romy Irving). When Toby (John Bell) goes to Sara's to lend her a comic, her mother comes to the door shortly after and introduces herself as Sara's mother. Toby is angry with Sara as she made up that she did not have a mum.
Ade	21 January 2011	Timi Lamikanra	Ade and Deyo ran away from their home in Libya, living at Elm Tree House for a few days. Ade and Dayo tell the children that when soldiers killed their parents, they hid underneath rubbish in order to escape from their country. They were also badly beaten by the soldiers. They were able to escape to England because they feared that they would be killed if they remained in Libya. When the residents learn what happened to the two boys, they are very moved and hide Ade and Dayo in the attic. They fear that once the immigration officials discovered their existence, they will be sent back to Africa It soon emerges that the Immigration Officials have found the brothers a home and they have leave to remain in the United Kingdom until they are eighteen years old.
Dayo	21 January 2011	Mohammed Mansaray	
TV Salesman	28 January 2011	Delroy Brown	After the kids find some money in the garden, Liam (Richard Wisker) and Frank (Chris Slater) decide to buy a TV. He is suspicious of Liam and Frank when they show him a bundle of cash they want to pay it with and they want to take it themselves, so he talks to a security guard.
Detective Sergeant	28 January 2011	Jackie Fielding	Gang members posing as police. When a bag of money is dumped in the garden of The Dumping Ground, Liam (Richard Wisker), Toby (John Bell) and Frank (Chris Slater) take the money. When they visit The Dumping Ground, they tell Mike (Connor Byrne), Tracy (Dani Harmer) and Gina (Kay Purcell) about the raid and money and ask if they can look in the garden for the money; however, they realise it's gone. The Detective Sergeant and Detective Constable speak with the kids. Toby later shows Tracy the money and Tracy convinces the kids to return the money they have. When the Detective Sergeant and Detective Constable pick up the money, they all realise they were not police officers.
Detective Constable	28 January 2011	Dean Ramsden	
Sausage Man	4 February 2011	Christian Steel	When Tracy (Dani Harmer) and Sapphire (Saffron Coomber) use pasta sauce in a curry, they offer to do the food shop so Gina (Kay Purcell) does not find out. They decide to stop and have a sausage, but Tracy has no cash to pay, so they decide to make a run for it. They are caught by the man, who gets them to dress up as sausages and hand out flyers.
Mr Watson	11 February 2011	Daymon Britton	Mr and Mrs Watson are potential foster parents for Johnny (Joe Maw) and Tee (Mia McKenna-Bruce). When Johnny and Tee stay with them for a short time, they tell Mike that they would be prepared to foster Tee, but not Johnny. Mike and Tracy (Dani Harmer) hide the truth from Johnny and Tee by saying Mr and Mrs Watson cannot look after them both. Johnny finds out the truth by looking in his file and he persuades Tee to be fostered by the Watson's on her own. When Johnny phones Tee, Mr Watson tells Johnny not to phone Tee to give her a chance of settling in. Tracy confronts Johnny about not answering Tee's calls and Johnny tells her that Mr Watson told him not to call, so Tracy arranges a bowling trip for everyone the same time Tee will be there. When their daughter Hannah tells her parents Tee was crying the night before because Johnny did not call, Mr Watson admits to Tee that he told Johnny not to phone. Tee moves back into the Dumping Ground.
Hannah Watson	11 February 2011	Daisy Doidge-Hill	
Mrs Watson	11 February 2011	Karen Traynor	
Mr Spooner	4 March 2011	Michael Jayston	Mr Spooner is the owner of the scooter Liam (Richard Wisker) crashes. Liam is sentenced to community service at an old peoples home where Mr Spooner live. When Liam overhears Mr Spooner on the phone to Eddie (Simon Lowe), Mr Spooner is annoyed with Liam; however, he almost falls and Liam takes him into his room. Mr Spooner talks to Liam about his National Service and Liam apologises about his scooter. When Liam looks at Eddie's repair charges, he tells Mr Spooner that Eddie is ripping him off. Liam spots Eddie disconnecting the battery on Mr Spooner's scooter and Mr Spooner is convinced by Eddie to trade in his scooter; however, Mr Spooner cannot afford a new one, so Eddie lets him have a reconditioned scooter. Liam tells Mr Spooner that Eddie is ripping him off and Liam jumps into the back of Eddie's van to prove it. Liam films Eddie connecting the battery on Mr Spooner's scooter and selling it to an old lady and shows the video to Mr Spooner and Tracy (Dani Harmer). When Eddie is about to sell a scooter to Mr Spooner, Liam goes through what he has charged Mr Spooner for repairs before showing him the video he took. Eddie gives Mr Spooner a free scooter on the condition Liam deletes the video; however, the police arrive soon after and arrest Eddie.
Eddie	4 March 2011	Simon Lowe	Eddie is a dodgy scooter salesman. Liam (Richard Wisker) spots Eddie disconnecting Mr Spooner's (Michael Jayston) before overhearing Eddie telling Mr Spooner the battery is dead and Eddie convinces Mr Spooner to trade in his scooter for a new one. When Eddie says it will cost £3,000, but negotiates a price, Mr Spooner cannot afford it, so Eddie says he can have a reconditioned one for £800. Liam tells Mr Spooner that Eddie is ripping him off and Liam jumps into the back of Eddie's van to prove it. Liam films Eddie connecting the battery on Mr Spooner's scooter and selling it to an old lady and shows the video to Mr Spooner and Tracy (Dani Harmer). When Eddie is about to sell a scooter to Mr Spooner, Liam goes through what he has charged Mr Spooner for repairs before showing him the video he took. Eddie gives Mr Spooner a free scooter on the condition Liam deletes the video; however, the police arrive soon after and arrest Eddie. Lowe reprises his role as Eddie in The Dumping Ground series 13 episode 2, "Bonnie Rides Again".
Sonia	4 March 2011	Helen Russell	Sonia is an old lady at the old peoples home, who was a model. When the kids visit the home, Sonia introduces herself to Carmen (Amy-Leigh Hickman) and Tee (Mia McKenna-Bruce). Initially anxious, Carmen and Tee relax around Sonia when Sonia tells them she has 38 pairs of shoes.
George	4 March 2011	David Andrews	George is an old man at the old peoples home, who stopped playing the piano when his family moved away. When the kids visit the home, Frank (Chris Slater) introduces himself to George, but George ignores him initially; however, he soon starts talking to Frank. George later plays the piano alongside Gus (Noah Marullo).
Magistrate	4 March 2011	Fiona MacPherson	The magistrate who sentences Liam O'Donovan (Richard Wisker) to community service after crashing Mr Spooner's (Michael Jayston) scooter.
Kali	11 March 2011	Holli Dempsey	Kali is an old friend of Elektra (Jessica Revell). Kali and Elektra were part of a gang called The Cobra's. Kali is slightly annoyed with Elektra as she never contacted her when she was in a secure unit. Tracy (Dani Harmer) turns up at the park and Kali introduces herself to Tracy. Tracy takes Elektra and Kali back to the Dumping Ground and Kali explains to Mike (Connor Byrne) that she knows she got Elektra into a lot of trouble, but has changed. Mike initially refuses to let Kali stay; however, Elektra convinces Mike to change his mind. Kali and Elektra later sneak out and Kali introduces Elektra to some of her other friends and Kali is impressed with Elektra when she stands up to Zazel (Ella Peel). Kali, Elektra and the rest of The Cobra's later go shopping and Kali later suggests to Elektra that she joins them and leaves The Dumping Ground. Elektra later meets up with Kali and the gang. Kali sends her friends to mug Toby (John Bell); however, Elektra intervenes and leaves Kali.
Zazel	11 March 2011	Ella Peel	Zazel is a friend of Kali's (Holly Dempsey). Zazel asks Elektra (Jessica Revell) where she was when Kali was locked up for six months and Elektra silences Zazel by saying that her and Kali will always be there for each other. Zazel joins the rest of The Cobra's when they go shopping.
Xanthe	18 March 2011	Kacey Ainsworth	When Frank's (Chris Slater) grandfather dies, Frank decides to sell his pocket watch to get some money so he can buy a headstone. Frank asks Xanthe for £100. Frank is told by Mike (Connor Byrne) that his grandfather will not be able to have a headstone as no one paid for his grandfather's funeral. Frank asks Xanthe for his pocket watch back, but Xanthe says it has been sold for £750. Tracy (Dani Harmer) intervenes and asks Xanthe if she would be interested in an antique car. Xanthe takes a look, but is not interested, until she sees the personalised number plate, which reads "X4N THE". Xanthe agrees to give Frank his pocket watch and cash back.

Series 3 (2012)
Character	Date(s)	Actor	Circumstances
Kitty	6 January 2012	Eleni Foskett	Kitty is a very withdrawn and socially awkward girl, who arrives at the Dumping Ground when a fire breaks out at her care home, Burnywood. Tracy (Dani Harmer) tries to encourage Kitty to open up to the care workers and speak to the other children. Tee (Mia McKenna-Bruce) shows Kitty some of her homemade crafts. When Elektra (Jessica Revell) chases after Tyler Lewis (Miles Butler-Houghton) and when Elektra and Carmen (Amy-Leigh Hickman) set Tyler's things on fire, the noise terrifies Kitty and Tee tries to calm Kitty down, but Kitty pushes her. When Johnny's (Joe Maw) money is stolen, the noise and fuss causes Kitty to become anxious, leading her to push Tracy down the stairs. A fire is caused by Denis (Jamie Gaddas) when he does not put a cigarette out properly and he plants the cigarettes in Kitty's room. Kitty tells Rick (Daniel Pearson) about the cigarettes and Rick chucks them at Tracy out of the window. Denis sanctions both Kitty and Rick. Kitty is moved to care home more equipped to help her with her problems.
Lizanne	6 January 2012	Lauren Mote	Lizanne arrives at the Dumping Ground when a fire breaks out at her care home, Burnywood. Johnny (Joe Maw), Frank (Chris Slater and Liam O'Donovan (Richard Wisker) are attracted to Lizanne and Lizanne uses their crushes to her advantage by getting a better room and money off them. It also turns out Lizanne was responsible for the fire, but it was an accident as she left her hair straighteners on and a cushion caught fire. Lizanne leaves when her mum is discharged from a psychiatric hospital.
Denis Stockle	6 January 2012	James Gaddas	Denis Stockle is a careless, controlling and unkind care worker who brings the four Burnywood children to Elmtree House following a fire. He proves himself to be a condescending and bossy person who thinks young people in care are "messed up"; his attitude infuriates and aggravates the young people and careworkers. He is shown to be an impatient bully, who illegally takes control of Elmtree House, becomes Head Careworker, and imposes bans on multiple luxury items. He resigned after Tracy (Dani Harmer) and Gus (Noah Marullo) found out that he started the fire at Elm Tree House by smoking in the attic, removing the batteries from the fire alarm and not putting the cigarettes out properly.
Electrician	13 January 2012	Scott Frazer	An electrician who Gus (Noah Marullo) refuses to let in, even after Gus is shown ID.
Mack	20 January 2012	Gary Faulkner	Mack owns an unlicensed DVD stall with Jack (Callum Callaghan). After buying a dodgy DVD from him Liam (Richard Wisker) wants a refund, but Mack refuses.
Ms Bowman	20 January 2012	Janine Leigh	Ms Bowman is an officer who fixes Liam (Richard Wisker) with a tag and she explains that if he breaks curfew thrice, he will be sent to a youth detention centre for the remainder of his sentence. When Liam accidentally breaks his curfew, Mr Bowman warns Tracy (Dani Harmer), Mike (Connor Byrne) and Gina (Kay Purcell) of what will happen if Liam breaks curfew twice more. Liam breaks curfew again when Elektra (Jessica Revell) and Tyler (Miles Butler-Houghton) move Liam's bedroom into the garden and Ms Bowman warns Liam he has one last chance. Liam breaks curfew shortly after when he realises that Jack (Richard Wisker) is his brother and could have helped Liam in court as he witnessed what happened and Ms Bowman phones the police.
Shadow	27 January 2012-11 January 2013	Connie	Shadow is a three-legged dog who followed Frank into the Dumping Ground after Frank (Chris Slater) went to the park. After she proves troublesome, she is taken to the animal shelter before being adopted by Steve (Ben Cartwright) and Lily (Jessie Williams). Lily and Carmen (Amy-Leigh Hickman) persuade Mike (Connor Byrne) to let Shadow stay at the Dumping Ground when Lily has respite care.
Claire	3 February 2012	Jane Dellow	Claire is a woman, who approaches Harry (Phillip Graham Scott) when he is alone in the park. Claire introduces herself and her baby son, who is also called Harry, to Harry. Claire asks Harry where his mum is and Harry explains how his mum hurt him then Sapphire (Saffron Coomber) was his mother, but then she left him and then Carmen (Amy-Leigh Hickman) was his mum. Claire then phones the police. When Sapphire finds Harry at the park, Claire tells Sapphire that she has phoned the police.
Big Issue Seller	3 February 2012	Gary Kitching	After he runs away, Harry (Philip Graham Scott) asks the Big Issue Seller if he knows who Sapphire (Saffron Coomber) is. When Sapphire goes looking for Harry, the Big Issue Seller guesses she is Sapphire when she asks him if he has seen Harry and he tells her where he is.
Charlie Johnson	10 February 2012	Kent Riley	Charlie is Justine's (Montanna Thompson) fiancé, who appears genuine; however, Rick (Daniel Pearson) overhears Charlie on the phone and confronts him, saying he is scamming Justine by getting her to trust him before getting money out of her. Rick later tells Justine and Tracy that Charlie is a conman and that Charlie bought him a laptop to keep quite. Justine, Rick, Tracy and Cam devise a set up to catch Charlie by getting Cam to pose as a customer in a restaurant Charlie is at and for her to leave her purse at the table. Charlie gives Cam her purse and Cam thanks him. Charlie offers to buy a Cam a coffee and Charlie pretends he does not have a girlfriend when Cam asks. Justine, Rick and Tracy appear and Justine ends her relationship with Charlie.
Mr Stevens	17 February 2012	Andrew Vincent	After Johnny (Joe Maw) takes a look in someone else's flat in the same block of flats where Sapphire (Saffron Coomber) lives, he angers the two men who live there and they get him to sneak into a storeroom and steal some expensive gadgets. Johnny sets off the alarm when he is startled by a spider. When he tries to escape, he is caught by Mr Stevens, who is mad with Johnny at first, but softens towards Johnny when Johnny tells him he is in care. Tracy (Dani Harmer) comes to collect Johnny and Mr Stevens finds out about the two men having many expensive things when Johnny explains himself to Tracy. When Sapphire and Elektra (Jessica Revell) try to get their phones back from the men, Mr Stevens arrives just in time and forces the men to give Sapphire and Elektra their mobiles back.
Farmer	24 February 2012	Jack McBride	The owner of the farmhouse where the young people and staff stay on holiday. He orders them to leave when his sheep are let out of the farm, which was done by Tee (Mia McKenna-Bruce).
Bus Conductor	24 February 2012	Dominic Doughty	The bus conductor who asks Lily (Jessie Williams) and Carmen (Amy-Leigh Hickman) if anyone is meeting them in Bristol and Lily lies her father is. When he is about to issue Tee (Mia McKenna-Bruce) a ticket, Tee tells him she wants to get off.
Landowner	24 February 2012	Sarah Thurstan	When Lily (Jessie Williams), Carmen (Amy-Leigh Hickman) and Tee get off a coach, they have no idea where they are. They walk down a path, but Lily and Carmen stay when Carmen's feet hurt, so Tee carries on. She encounters the landowner and Tee helps her by shutting a gate field on the sheep. Tee gets upset and explains to the landowner how she wanted to be a good friend to Lily and Carmen by keeping quite about them going to Wales, but wanted to stop them as she did not want to get lost. She takes Tee through some bushes and they end up on the grounds of Manor Hall Farm. Mike (Connor Byrne), Tracy (Dani Harmer), Lily, Carmen, Johnny (Joe Maw) and Frank Matthews (Chris Slater) also end up at Manor Hall Farm. The landowner approaches Mike and apologises for turning them down when he wanted to book a holiday there as she thought the young people would be out of control. She lets them have a holiday there for half price with free board.
Melissa Valentine	2 March 2012	Angela Terence	Melissa is the older sister of Elektra (Jessica Revell), who arrives at the Dumping Ground to tell Elektra she is getting married and wants her as bridesmaid. Melissa and Elektra go shopping for a bridesmaid's dress and Melissa reluctantly agrees that Elektra can keep the blue in her hair. Melissa persuades Elektra to meet their parents again before the wedding. When Marilyn tells Elektra she will need a sample of her natural hair to get rid of the blue, Elektra says that Melissa is fine with it, but Melissa is forced to agree with their mum. To get back at her family, Elektra cancels Melissa's wedding. Melissa visits Elektra with a present, a pair of white doc martens and Elektra admits to Melissa that she cancelled the wedding. When Melissa phones up the venue, her booking has been given to someone else and Melissa agrees with their parents about Elektra. Melissa apologises to Elektra and she gives Elektra the shoes and she finds out that Melissa and Harvey got married their own way.
Marilyn Perkins	2 March 2012	Lizzy McInnerny	Marilyn and Bernard Perkins are the parents of Melissa (Angela Terence) and Elektra (Jessica Revell). Melissa persuades Elektra to meet their parents again before the wedding. Marilyn serves Elektra a vegetarian lasagna for dinner. When Marilyn tells Elektra she will need a sample of her natural hair to get rid of the blue, Elektra almost loses her temper with her parents and she shows Tracy her old bedroom. Later, Marilyn and Bernard ask Elektra not to tell Harvey about her being in care and that they've told Harvey she is away at school. Elektra rows with her parents before storming out of their house with Tracy (Dani Harmer).
Bernard Perkins	2 March 2012	Ron Webster	
Melanie	23 March 2012	Emily Glenister	Melanie is the new careworker, taking over from Tracy (Dani Harmer). When Jody (Kia Pegg) suffers an anaphylactic shock at Tracy's leaving party, Melanie gives Jody an epipen injection and everyone praises Melanie when Jody comes round. When Melanie cannot do Gus's (Noah Marullo) tour, Melanie shows him how to move something in his schedule. Sapphire (Saffron Coomber) wants to take a flat that is miles away, so Tracy speaks to the council to see if there is a closer place and Tracy slams the phone down when she learns that the block of flats where Sapphire use to live has been sold. Melanie asks if she should ring up and try a more gentle approach. Knowing the kids are sad about Tracy leaving, Melanie comes up with an idea for them to show that and they make a memory book for Tracy. Tracy invites Melanie to stay at her party.

== See also ==
- List of Tracy Beaker (franchise) characters
- List of The Story of Tracy Beaker characters
- List of The Dumping Ground characters
