= The Dumping Ground series 8 =

The Dumping Ground
- Series 8
- Series Eight Title Card
- Starring: Miles Butler-Hughton; Kia Pegg; Sarah Rayson; Stacy Liu; Ruben Reuter; Annabelle Davis; Hannah Moncur; Carma Hylton; Jasmine Uson; Leo James; Cole Welleans-Watts; Josh Sangha; Ava Potter; Anya Cooke; Louis Payne; Chloe Lea; Tut Nyuot; Jed Jefferson
- No. of episodes: 24

Release
- Original network: CBBC; CBBC HD
- Original release: 10 January 2020 – 5 February 2021

Series chronology
- ← Previous; Series 7 Next → Series 9

The eighth series of the British children's television series The Dumping Ground began broadcasting on 10 January 2020 on CBBC and ended on 5 February 2021. The series follows the lives of the children living in the fictional children's care home of Ashdene Ridge, nicknamed by them "The Dumping Ground". It consisted of twenty-four, thirty-minute episodes. It is the 16th series in The Story of Tracy Beaker franchise.

== Cast ==
=== Main ===
- Miles Butler-Hughton as Tyler Lewis (until episode 12)
- Kia Pegg as Jody Jackson
- Sarah Rayson as Floss Guppy
- Stacy Liu as May-Li Wang
- Ruben Reuter as Finn McLaine
- Annabelle Davis as Sasha Bellman
- Hannah Moncur as Chloe Reeves
- Carma Hylton as Candi-Rose
- Jasmine Uson as Taz De Souza
- Leo James as Bird Wallis
- Cole Wealleans-Watts as Jay Wallis
- Josh Sangha as Sid Khan
- Ava Potter as Bec Hyde
- Anya Cooke as Katy White
- Louis Payne as Scott Jenson
- Chloe Lea as Viv (from episode 5)
- Tut Nyuot as Nazeer (episodes 11-14, 17)
- Jed Jefferson as Max Riley (from episode 16)

=== Guest ===
- Gary Webster as Al Winters (episode 1/2)
- Steven Blakeley as Ed Grayson (episode 1)
- Endy McKay as Jenny Holmes (episode 1)
- Cherry Campbell as Iona (episode 3)
- Scott Karim as K'Alias (episode 4)
- Lucy Thackeray as Stef (episode 5)
- Matilda Shapland as Emma (episode 5)
- Bethany Asher as Ivy (episode 6/14)
- Geoff Berrisford as Jake (episode 6)
- Omar Malik as Kamal Hameed (episode 7)
- Connor Lawson as Alex Walker (episode 8)
- Carlos Mapano as Jerome De Souza (episode 9)
- Vanessa Hehir as Amanda (episode 9)
- Solomon Israel as Ray (episode 10)
- Jessica Revell as Elektra Perkins (episode 12)
- Adam Little as Elliot (episode 13)
- Sian Reeves as Daphne Davis (episode 14)
- Liv De-Vulgt as Ruby Butler (episode 15)
- Nia Gwynne as Hazel Butler (episode 15)
- Lola Sattar as Zara (episode 16)
- Kellie Shirley as Maria White (episode 19)
- Christina Berriman Dawson as Annie (episode 19)
- James Bartlett as Luke Jackson (episode 20)
- Laura Whitmore as Savannah B (episode 20)
- Michele Austin as Alice (episode 21)
- William Talbot as Ross Maydons (episode 21)
- Richard Blackwood as Reggie Wallis (episode 22)
- India Jean-Jacques as Gemma (episode 23)
- Lucy Carless as Cara (episode 24)
- Derek Griffiths as Larry Meadow (episode 24)

== Episodes ==
The series' second half's directors include Hildegard Ryan (4 episodes), Vicki Kisner, and Gary Williams (4 episodes), and produced by Emma Bodger.

No. overall	No. in series	Title	Directed by	Written by	Original release date	UK viewers (millions)
Part 1
139	1	"Natural Selection"	Nicole Volavka	Julie Dixon	10 January 2020	0.15
With Mike gone, the day arrives for a new head care worker to be appointed. May-Li is hoping to be promoted, so to make sure she is, Jody makes sure the kids don't step out of line so she gets the job. However, Floss sees that May-Li is basing her case study presentation on Jody including everything she's been through and even her personal information. When she learns about this, Jody is furious and rebels against May-Li, stopping her from giving her presentation and forcing her to resign. Another man, Al, becomes head care worker instead. This makes everyone else hate Jody but Jody ignores them. First Appearance: Louis Payne as Scott Jenson
140	2	"Follow My Leader"	Nicole Volavka	Dawn Harrison	17 January 2020	0.15
Under Al's leadership, the DG has dissolved into chaos despite the efforts of the temporary assistant care worker, Scott. Al is proving to be unprofessional, as well as biased against certain kids, leaving Tyler unhappy along with many of the others. When May-Li briefly returns to return her keys, Taz and Katy stow away in her car and find her working at a nursery. Believing she has found a new job, they try to sabotage her position, only to learn that she is doing her regular shift at Henry's nursery. Despite their hopes she will return, May-Li tells them she has been applying for other positions and is going to an interview later that day. Meanwhile, Tyler hatches a plan to persuade Al to quit by handing him several folders of false paperwork to fill in, but Jody, who remains unrepentant over her actions, ruins the plan. Sasha and Chloe attempt to find out more about whether they can trust Scott. Sid learns about May-Li's interview and decides to go looking for her alone. When the others find out he is missing, Tyler berates Jody for her lack of remorse, leading her to help in the efforts to find him. They find him with the help of May-Li and discover he's sprained his ankle. After taking him to hospital Jody apologises to May-Li but learns that she has been offered the new job. Before she can accept it, however, Al admits he is not suitable for a head care worker role and relinquishes his position to her with an admission that she was the best candidate. With May-Li appointed as head care worker, and Scott appointed as a permanent care worker at Ashdene Ridge, everyone is delighted to see that the DG is officially back in business.
141	3	"Auld Lang Syne"	Nicole Volavka	Claire Miller	24 January 2020	0.17
It's burns day at the DG and Chloe is excited as her old friend from Scotland is visiting for the occasion but the reunion ends up reminding her painfully about her mother. Meanwhile, Bec is depressed on Burns Day as it's also the anniversary of her mother's death. She tries to keep it a secret but Taz finds out and ends up telling everyone else, making Bec angry. Meanwhile, Tyler and Sid go against Jody and Katy in the dance competition for burns day which turns to war.
142	4	"Somebody"	Nicole Volavka	Rachel Smith	31 January 2020	0.15
While on a tour with a well known street artist, Sasha discovers that his latest piece is almost identical to a piece she has made for her college exhibition. Convinced the artist, K'Alias, has stolen her idea, she enlists Tyler and Jody's help to try and prove it. While on another tour of his studio, she discovers a picture of him in front of her work, solidifying her suspicions. After angrily confronting him, during which he claims to not even remember any of her work, she storms out. Now convinced she has wasted her life trying to be an artist, Sasha proceeds to vandalise K'Alias' piece. Elsewhere, Candi-Rose decides to take up vlogging, wanting to try and gain large numbers of followers. She is dismayed to learn that her own efforts are attracting little attention and most of her followers are down to Finn and Sid making their own vlog on hers. Finn assures her that she doesn't need the attention of anonymous people online as she is already liked by everyone in the house, cheering her up greatly. Meanwhile, Floss has a row with Scott about an upcoming trip and writes an angry note saying he should be sacked in retaliation. After hearing him talk about her more leniently she regrets it and tries to get the note back, only to learn that he had already seen it. Sasha gets a visit from K'Alias, who assures her that it can be difficult to find someone has already thought of your idea, but that she shouldn't give up her dream because one piece didn't work out. He offers to be her mentor, and Sasha accepts. Together the pair properly unveil K'Alias' piece, with Sasha's sprayed additions still in place. Absent: Ava Potter as Bec Hyde
143	5	"Sugar and Spice"	Sean Glynn	Christine Robertson	7 February 2020	0.14
Floss meets a dream family who want to foster her. The Mum and sister in the family seem perfect so Floss looks at her weaknesses to try to become the perfect daughter but it doesn't go to plan. Meanwhile, new girl Viv arrives and she and Sasha get competitive on a challenge about general knowledge on the other young people and both soon become enemies whist Scott and Jay become competitive in yoga. First Appearance: Chloe Lea as Viv Absent: Ava Potter as Bec Hyde
144	6	"Love Hearts And Roses"	Sean Glynn	John Hickman	14 February 2020	0.17
It's Valentines Day at the DG and Finn tries to get the perfect date with Ivy whilst Tyler tries too hard to make the day perfect for him and Jody. Meanwhile, Chloe is not pleased to be going gaming with Jake for their Valentine's day treat and tries to get them to break up in revenge.
145	7	"A Matter of Life and Debt"	Sean Glynn	Anthony MacMurray	21 February 2020	0.16
Tyler discovers from his step-dad that his real Dad has passed, away. He doesn't care at first as his Dad left Tyler and his Mum when Tyler was just a baby but later learns that his father came back and lived nearby. Tyler and his step-dad explore his Dad's flat and learn more about him and Tyler finally starts to feel the impact on him because of his Dad's death and discovers that he needs help from family and friends to get through life. Meanwhile, Sasha notices how some of the YP need money as their allowances have run out and as Sasha has spare, they start asking for loans and Sasha and Jay eventually start off their loan bank. However, Sasha uses almost all her money on loans and can't afford to buy tickets for a concert she wants to go to and soon finds herself begging for loans. Taz discovers her Dad was unable to pay for his electricity bills and uses her talent for playing the piano to raise money for him so he can afford the bills. Absent: Chloe Lea as Viv and Ava Potter as Bec Hyde
146	8	"Risk"	Sean Glynn	Gareth Sergeant	28 February 2020	0.19
Tired of being considered a "goody two shoes", Chloe decides to become a "fixer" in the DG, forcing her to take huge risks to get the other kids out of trouble. Meanwhile, after spending the day with Alex, Finn decides that he wants to live with him but soon realises that it isn't as simple as it seems. Elsewhere Sid's ventriloquist dummy is taken and held to ransom, forcing him to provide different treats to get him back. Guest Appearance: Connor Lawson as Alex Walker Absent: Chloe Lea as Viv
147	9	"The Replacement"	Alex Jacob	Hannah George	6 March 2020	0.13
Taz learns that her dad has a new girlfriend and refuses to accept it, thinking that she is making him forget about her mum. Meanwhile, Candi-Rose bribes Jay with a ticket to a trainer launch to be her servant for the day, while Sasha tries to help Finn overcome his fear of spiders.
148	10	"Do the Right Thing"	Alex Jacob	Suzanne Cowie	13 March 2020	0.11
Viv departs from the Dumping Ground to go and live with her uncle Ray who used to steal things but now claims to have changed. However, Viv discovers that he's lost his job and is now stealing and selling phones to afford the rent. Hurt that her uncle hasn't really changed, Viv returns to Ashdene Ridge. Meanwhile, Bec discovers a stray dog and tries to keep it a secret from May-Li and Scott, and Bird tries to help numerous Ashdene Ridge residents with numerous things but messes it up.
149	11	"Trouble in Paradise"	Alex Jacob	Claire Miller	20 March 2020	0.16
Tyler is offered the chance to go to St. Lucia to live with his Mum but because of the ongoing relationship between him and Jody, he can't risk leaving Jody behind. Sid observes them kissing and when word gets to May-Li and Scott about this, they make life harder for Jody and Tyler - separating them in order to keep them both at the DG. Meanwhile, Jay tries to prove to new boy Nazeer that he practically owns the DG. First Appearance: Tut Nuyot as Nazeer
150	12	"Go Your Own Way"	Alex Jacob	Mark Stevenson	27 March 2020	0.13
Tyler and Jody prepare to go to the airport and have a life in St. Lucia together but when they realize that Jody's passport is still at Ashdene Ridge, they risk going back there, break in (with help from Elektra who is helping the pair get to the airport) and collect it but are spotted by May-Li. She arranges for Tyler and Jody to go to St. Lucia but the threat of leaving her old life and her friends behind stops Jody from going and Tyler ends up going to St. Lucia with Jody staying behind. Meanwhile, the DG olympics begin and the two groups get rival in the olympics. Last Appearance: Miles Butler-Hughton as Tyler Lewis Guest Appearance: Jessica Revell as Elektra Perkins
Part 2
151	13	"What's Mine Is Mine"	John Howlett	Zoe Lister	25 September 2020	0.08
Jay teams up with Bird to reclaim his rightful trophy from his biggest rival, Elliot. But in the process, he risks getting sent to a secure unit. Meanwhile, Scott introduces a healthy eating scheme which includes banning unhealthy foods. This proves unpopular with many people so Bec gives sweets out in return for money. Sasha tries to get people to acknowledge her birthday.
152	14	"Shattered"	John Howlett	Matt Sinclair	2 October 2020	0.09
After Bird gets accused of breaking a window, he sets out to prove his innocence with Chloe's help. Meanwhile, Finn's date with Ivy is disrupted by the presence of her police office mother, and Sid believes he has hypnotised Scott.
153	15	"Keeping Face"	Hildegard Ryan	Dawn Harrison	9 October 2020	0.08
Bec becomes friends with new girl Ruby after seeing the similarities between them but this leads to shocking discoveries. Meanwhile, Scott realizes he's being strict and boring to the kids so he tries to make it more fun for them which makes everything worse. Jay reads a love story given by Candi-Rose (in order for money) and tries to convince everyone that he isn't getting into it. First Appearance: Liv De-Vulgt as Ruby Butler Absent: Tut Nyuot as Nazeer
154	16	"Everybody Needs a Friend"	Hildegard Ryan	Dare Aiyegbayo	16 October 2020	0.10>
Scott encounters a girl stealing from a food bank and goes to approach her about it. After she tells him about her situation, he becomes determined to help, only to discover not all is as it seems. Meanwhile, Candi-Rose feels that she and Chloe have nothing in common anymore and decides to divorce their friendship, whilst Sid and newcomer Max try to make the house as safe as possible. First Appearance: Jed Jefferson as Max Absent: Tut Nyuot as Nazeer
155	17	"Truth or Scare"	John Howlett	Jeff Povey and Anthony MacMurray	23 October 2020	0.10>
During a power cut on Halloween night, Jay, Bird and Viv decide to scare the others with ghost stories. Though they delight in scaring the little ones, the trio find themselves in a scary situation themselves as everyone prepares to go trick-or-treating. Absent: Jed Jefferson as Max Last Appearance: Tut Nyuot as Nazeer
156	18	"Sasha Claus"	Gary Williams	Gareth Sergeant	11 December 2020	0.08>
A heavy blizzard leaves the kids stranded indoors without the care workers on Christmas Eve, meaning they can't leave to see their families for Christmas. Sasha takes it upon herself to try and make it a good Christmas for everyone regardless, but while most of them eagerly get involved, including Max, some resist her efforts, particularly Bec.
157	19	"Great Expectations"	Hildegard Ryan	Hannah George	8 January 2021	0.09
After a visit with her mum, Katy wants do more to support her and she and Jody try to find her. Meanwhile, Viv tries to give the other kids good advice and Scott's lottery ticket gets the whole DG searching for it. Absent: Jed Jefferson as Max
158	20	"Snakes and Ladders"	Vicki Kisner	David Chikwe	15 January 2021	0.13>
Jody is looking forward to spending a day doing work experience with her brother Luke, but she soon learns that it won't be all fun and games as she had hoped. Meanwhile, Candi-Rose invites a social media influencer to the house after winning a competition, while Scott finds himself distracted by an online game. Absent: Ruben Reuter as Finn McLaine, Ava Potter as Bec Hyde and Jed Jefferson as Max
159	21	"Nobody's Perfect"	Hildegard Ryan	Kim Millar	22 January 2021	0.10>
May-Li's wife Alice comes to the Dumping Ground for the day. Though she proves popular with the kids, they become concerned that May-Li is prioritising her work over her personal life to detrimental levels. Meanwhile, Floss learns that she and Ross actually are siblings, and the pair set out to find their real mum. But when Scott finds out he tells Floss that was a serious situation and takes away some privileges from her. Elsewhere, Jay and Bird cause trouble on the local golf course. And when May Li gets a phone call from the golf club she sends Bird and Jay to clean there mess up as punishment.
160	22	"Broken Record"	Gary Williams	Asher Pirie	29 January 2021	0.10>
Jay and Bird encounter their dad, who tries to convince them he's changed and that they can be a family again. While Jay believes him, Bird continues to distrust him, leading to the truth about their dad's claims coming out, along with a bigger, more personal bombshell. Meanwhile, Taz is convinced a monster is on the loose in the house, whilst Sid and Max try to learn new survival skills. Absent: Ruben Reuter as Finn McLaine
161	23	"Far From The Tree"	Gary Williams	Christine Robertson	5 February 2021	0.10
After a run-in with a rival at the boxing club, Jody is accused of physical assault. As she struggles to control her anger, she fears she may have more in common with her family than she hoped. Meanwhile, Scott tries to challenge the idea that he's forgetful, while Viv enlists Candi-Rose's help to make a film about the DG. Absent: Ruben Reuter as Finn McLaine
162	24	"Dream Life"	Gary Williams	John Hickman	5 February 2021	0.11
Finn spends the day doing work experience at the local hospital. As he goes about trying to help both his supervisor and an elderly patient with their problems, he finds himself struggling to work out what he wants to do with his own life, causing him to retreat to his imagination to assess his options. Absent: Annabelle Davis as Sasha Bellman Departed: Ava Potter as Bec Hyde Last Appearance: Chloe Lea as Viv
