= The Dumping Ground series 9 =

The Dumping Ground
- Series 9
- Series Nine Title Card
- Starring: Kia Pegg; Sarah Rayson; Stacy Liu; Ruben Reuter; Annabelle Davis; Hannah Moncur; Carma Hylton; Jasmine Uson; Leo James; Cole Welleans-Watts; Josh Sangha; Ava Potter; Anya Cooke; Louis Payne; Jed Jefferson; Lenny Rush; Liv De-Vulgt; Halle Cassell; Freddy Smith
- No. of episodes: 20

Release
- Original network: CBBC; BBC HD and CBBC iPlayer
- Original release: 11 June 2021 – 25 March 2022

Series chronology
- ← Previous; Series 8 Next → Series 10

The ninth series of the British children's television series The Dumping Ground began broadcasting on 11 June 2021 on CBBC and concluded on 25 March 2022. The series follows the lives of the children living in the fictional children's care home of Ashdene Ridge, nicknamed by them "The Dumping Ground". It consists of twenty, thirty-minute episodes. It is the 18th series in The Story of Tracy Beaker franchise (My Mum Tracy Beaker having aired between this and the eighth series). This series is shorter than usual due to the COVID-19 pandemic and substantial delays in filming. This marked the last regular appearance of Annabelle Davis as Sasha Bellman prior to her new acting role in Hollyoaks as Lacey Lloyd.

== Cast ==
=== Main ===
- Kia Pegg as Jody Jackson
- Sarah Rayson as Floss Guppy
- Stacy Liu as May-Li Wang
- Ruben Reuter as Finn McLaine (until episode 7)
- Annabelle Davis as Sasha Bellman (until episode 15)
- Lenny Rush as Murphy Bellman (from episode 10)
- Hannah Moncur as Chloe Reeves (until episode 9)
- Carma Hylton as Candi-Rose
- Jasmine Uson as Taz De Souza
- Leo James as Bird Wallis
- Cole Wealleans-Watts as Jay Wallis
- Josh Sangha as Sid Khan
- Ava Potter as Bec Hyde (from episode 11)
- Anya Cooke as Katy White
- Louis Payne as Scott Jenson
- Liv De-Vulgt as Ruby Butler (from episode 10)
- Jed Jefferson as Max Riley (until episode 17)
- Halle Cassell as Clem Stephens (from episode 6)
- Freddy Smith as Kyle (from episode 15)

=== Guest ===
- Jude Owusu as Ben (episode 2)
- Joyce Veheary as Mayumi De Souza (episode 4)
- Tim FitzHigham as Mr. Hargreaves (episode 4)
- Mark Williams as Les Vegas (episode 5)
- Madeleine Edmondson as Sienna (episode 6)
- Hannah McIver as Shona (episode 8)
- Quanna Luo Masterson as Jing (episode 9)
- Nicola Stephenson as Delilah Fortune (episode 11)
- Amelda Brown as Joan Hyde (episode 11)
- Prince Gaius Osi as Robbie (episode 12)
- William Talbot as Ross Maydons (episode 13)
- Ellie White as Jen (episode 13)
- Lee Mead as Drew (episode 15)
- Danny Parsons as Nathan Jenson (episode 16)
- Bridget Grant as Joy (episode 20)
- Miles Butler-Hughton as Tyler Lewis (episode 20)

== Episodes ==
u

No. overall	No. in series	Title	Directed by	Written by	Original release date	UK viewers (millions)
Part 1
163	1	"Moment of Truth"	Diana Patrick	Julia Kent	11 June 2021	0.06>
Bird is given a stone similar to an old family one that could supposedly grant wishes. Fed up with Jay's constant lies, he wishes that his brother would simply tell the truth. Jay suddenly finds himself unable to lie at all, causing him to panic when he risks incriminating himself over a missing laptop.
164	2	"Sweet and Sour"	Diana Patrick	Kim Millar	18 June 2021	0.11
Jody starts attending counselling to help with her anger issues. When the counsellor suggests her feelings are linked to her past, however, she turns defensive, unwilling to view her family in a negative light. Meanwhile, Candi-Rose tries to follow an online guru's course on happiness, which irritates the rest of the house. Absent: Ruben Reuter as Finn McLaine
165	3	"The Remote"	Diana Patrick	Jeff Povey	25 June 2021	0.10
Several clashes break out in the DG over the TV remote, with Sasha not wanting to move to get it and Sid trying to keep it safe so he can watch an important programme. Meanwhile, Jody fears Tyler is moving on and forgetting her, while Floss tries to manipulate Max into rebelling against Sid. Absent: Stacy Liu as May-Li Wang, Hannah Moncur as Chloe Reeves, Jasmine Uson as Taz De Souza, Leo James as Bird Wallis, Anya Cooke as Katy White and Louis Payne as Scott Jenson.
166	4	"The Diwata of Ogleton Wood"	Diana Patrick	Paul Campbell	2 July 2021	0.11>
Taz discovers some old videos of her mum that reveal she had a mysterious attachment to a nearby wood which she helped save from being torn down. When she discovers that the council are planning a fresh attempt at developing on the land, she tries to take action. Meanwhile, Floss enlists Max's help to create a video series on Ashdene Ridge to boost her profile, but her desire for dramatic content leads to them butting heads on her ethics. Absent: Anya Cooke as Katy White, Kia Pegg as Jody Jackson, and Ruben Reuter as Finn McLaine
167	5	"Old Friends"	Diana Patrick	Hannah George	9 July 2021	0.10>
Sid is upset when Fred's original owner finds him and takes him back. After tracking him down and bringing him back to the DG, he and the owner try to make their cases for keeping him. Meanwhile, Katy's knack for lying to authority comes into demand, while Sasha struggles to write a personal statement. Absent: Kia Pegg as Jody Jackson, Ruben Reuter as Finn McLaine, Hannah Moncur as Chloe Reeves and Leo James as Bird Wallis
168	6	"Partners in Crime"	Sean Glynn	Scott Payne	16 July 2021	0.10
Floss gets jealous when Max won't let her play with his new console. She teams up with temporary housemate Sienna to take it, but Sienna demands money in return and proceeds to blackmail Floss to get it. When Max catch’s Floss taking the money she says it was Sienna and Scott tells Floss this is a new low for her and Floss decides to leave Ashdene Ridge until Sasha finally catches Sienna in the act and she moves to another care home. Meanwhile, the rest of the house find another new arrival, Clem, difficult to get along with. First Appearance: Halle Cassell as Clem Absent: Ruben Reuter as Finn McLaine, Hannah Moncur as Chloe Reeves and Carma Hylton as Candi-Rose.
169	7	"Festival Fibber"	Sean Glynn	Niki Rooney	23 July 2021	0.07>
When Sasha receives a message and call from an unknown number threatening to tell May-Li that she went to a music festival without permission, she becomes desperate to find out who is behind it before May-Li gets home. Departed: Ruben Reuter as Finn McLaine Note: This is the first (and so far only) episode of the series to be produced entirely using the screenlife format, with the whole episode taking place from the perspective of Sasha's phone screen and other characters appearing via video calls.
170	8	"Losing Your Cool"	Sunny Bahia	John Hickman	30 July 2021	0.08
Jay falls in love with a girl at the charity shop and changes his entire image to try and impress her. Meanwhile, Clem asks Sid to help her sneak some friends into the house for the night. Absent: Kia Pegg as Jody Jackson, Hannah Moncur as Chloe Reeves, Jasmine Uson as Taz De Souza, Anya Cooke as Katy White and Jed Jefferson as Max Riley
171	9	"Memory Lane"	Sean Glynn	Zoë Lister	6 August 2021	0.07>
May-Li's cousin Jing visits the Dumping Ground to ask her to be a bridesmaid at her wedding. Despite how close they used to be, however, May-Li is reluctant to connect with her cousin or the prospect of reuniting with her family. Meanwhile, Chloe is offered the chance to be fostered, but the prospect of leaving overwhelms her. Last Appearance: Hannah Moncur as Chloe Reeves
172	10	"Run, Rescue, Repeat"	Sean Glynn	Dawn Harrison	13 August 2021	0.06>
Sasha's wayward little brother Murphy is found living alone and is put into temporary care at the DG. His refusal to settle in and various tantrums become too much for Sasha to handle, prompting her to walk out. Meanwhile, Ruby Butler returns to the DG as a permanent resident, but she tries too hard to fit in leaving herself open to Clem's tricks. First Appearance: Lenny Rush as Murphy Bellman Note: Liv De-Vulgt as Ruby Butler becomes a main character in this episode.
Part 2
173	11	"Saviour"	Vicki Kisner	Rachel Smith	21 January 2022	0.12>
Ruby wants to thank Bec for everything with her and her mum and goes to visit her on her aunt's farm. She quickly realises that all is not well, however, and is desperate to help her. When Bec’s aunt is ill Bec’s grandmother returns and takes over confidences Bec’s phone makes her work on the farm even makes her sleep in the barn until Scott comes to the rescue and Bec goes back to Ashdene Ridge. Meanwhile, Clem is asked to help the gardener to help with her concentration problems, but the task proves difficult for her. Absent: Sarah Rayson as Floss Guppy, Carma Hylton as Candi-Rose, Josh Sangha as Sid Khan, Jed Jefferson as Max Riley and Lenny Rush as Murphy Bellman Returned: Ava Potter as Bec Hyde
174	12	"Friend Zone"	Vicki Kisner	Joseph Lidster	28 January 2022	0.10>
Sasha gets upset with Jody's dismissive attitude towards art during a visit to an exhibition she has entered. Jody's attempt to make amends leads to them having to break into the exhibition to fix it, resulting in a blazing row between the pair. Meanwhile, an electrician's assistant falls for Candi-Rose, making Bird jealous. Absent: Jasmine Uson as Taz De Souza, Cole Wealleans-Watts as Jay Wallis, Jed Jefferson as Max Riley and Halle Cassell as Clem
175	13	"Face to Face"	Paul Riordan	Christine Robertson	4 February 2022	0.10>
Social Services finally track down Floss' mum, and after some hesitation Floss agrees to meet with her. As she seeks answers from her past, Floss finds herself wanting to get to know her mum more, but she gets upset learning that her mum may not want the same thing. Absent: Kia Pegg as Jody Jackson, Annabelle Davis as Sasha Bellman, Jasmine Uson as Taz De Souza, Leo James as Bird Wallis, Cole Wealleans-Watts as Jay Wallis, Ava Potter as Bec Hyde, Louis Payne as Scott Jenson, Jed Jefferson as Max Riley, Halle Cassell as Clem and Lenny Rush as Murphy Bellman Note: This episode includes several flashbacks to older episodes, featuring some departed characters from the series.
176	14	"Finders Keepers"	Paul Riordan	Robert Butler	11 February 2022	0.07>
During a trip in the woods, Bird finds a box filled with cash. After he brings it back to the DG, it doesn't take long for Floss, Sid and Bec to find out about it, and their differing views on what to do with the money leaves Bird conflicted as to what the right thing to do is. Absent: Annabelle Davis as Sasha Bellman, Anya Cooke as Katy White, Jed Jefferson as Max Riley and Lenny Rush as Murphy Bellman
177	15	"The Beat Goes On"	Vicki Kisner	Dare Aiyegbayo	18 February 2022	0.08>
The lead singer of Sasha's favourite metal band reveals to her he plans to leave the band and create his own music. She brings him back to the DG to try and make him change his mind, but she soon comes round to the idea after seeing his passion for his new work and her efforts to promote it lead to him giving her a life-changing offer. Meanwhile, Sid and Max are afraid that the latest arrival, Kyle, is up to no good. First Appearance: Freddy Smith as Kyle Last Appearance: Annabelle Davis as Sasha Bellman Absent: Liv De-Vulgt as Ruby Butler
178	16	"The Brothers Murray"	Paul Riordan	Matt Sinclair	25 February 2022	0.07>
Scott's brother Nathan arrives at the DG to do work experience. The brothers aren't entirely close, in part due to Nathan's carelessness in comparison to Scott's more responsible nature. When Scott learns that Nathan is homeless, he allows him to stay in the DG for the night, but this effort to build bridges risks his career in the process. Meanwhile, Katy is told by Clem that her social media profile is boring, so she tries coming up with ways to make herself look interesting. Absent: Kia Pegg as Jody Jackson, Sarah Rayson as Floss Guppy, Carma Hylton as Candi-Rose, Ava Potter as Bec Hyde and Jed Jefferson as Max Riley
179	17	"Rocket Man"	Vicki Kisner	Claire Miller	4 March 2022	0.08>
Sid's plans to fly his new drone are impeded by the rest of the house asking him for help, particularly with Murphy causing trouble. He ends up snapping at them and has an accident which puts him in hospital. While under anaesthetic, he has a dream about going on a space adventure, in which he soon realises the dangers of ignoring his problems rather than solving them. Absent: Kia Pegg as Jody Jackson, Sarah Rayson as Floss Guppy, Carma Hylton as Candi-Rose, Leo James as Bird Wallis, Cole Wealleans-Watts as Jay Wallis, Ava Potter as Bec Hyde and Freddy Smith as Kyle Last Appearance: Jed Jefferson as Max Riley
180	18	"Stand Up"	Alex Browning	Mark Boutros	11 March 2022	0.09>
After Bird receives a racist comment on one of his comedy videos, he tries to keep his feelings on it bottled up as he prepares to enter a comedy competition. However, his suppressed anger leads to him struggling to come up with material and he starts to lash out as the others try to support him. Meanwhile, Ruby tries to learn more about how to tackle racism, while Sid and Taz try to create a comedy act of their own. Absent: Sarah Rayson as Floss Guppy, Anya Cooke as Katy White, Lenny Rush as Murphy Bellman and Freddy Smith as Kyle
181	19	"The Master Plan"	Paul Riordan	Owen Lloyd-Fox	18 March 2022	N/A
Today is May-Li's wedding anniversary. To make sure everything goes smoothly so she doesn't forget like last year, she draws up a master plan to make sure everyone gets to where they are meant to go throughout the day without trouble, inadvertently pushing Scott out of handling any of the difficult tasks. Despite her best efforts, the day is disrupted when Murphy accidentally messes up the plan, and things go from bad to worse when Kyle goes missing. Absent: Sarah Rayson as Floss Guppy and Ava Potter as Bec Hyde
182	20	"Breaking Chains"	Paul Riordan	Ciara Conway	25 March 2022	N/A
Jody learns her brother Kingsley is dead. When none of her family decide to help with his funeral, she takes it upon herself to try and arrange things. However, her feelings towards her brother and what he did to her make things hard for her, and even the return of an old face doesn't make coming to terms with things easier. Meanwhile, Bec meets a girl called Joy and begins to realise she has feelings for her, which draws the attention of Jay. Last Appearance: Ava Potter as Bec Hyde, Anya Cooke as Katy White, Louis Payne as Scott Jenson, Liv De-Vulgt as Ruby Butler and Lenny Rush as Murphy Bellman. Departed: Liv De-Vulgt as Ruby Butler Guest Appearance: Miles Butler-Hughton as Tyler Lewis Absent: Sarah Rayson as Floss Guppy Note: This episode includes several flashbacks to older episodes, featuring David Avery as Kingsley Jackson and James Bartlett as Luke Jackson
