= The Dumping Ground Dish Up =

- Title card
- Genre: Children; Comedy drama
- Starring: Saffron Coomber; Joe Maw; Jessica Revell; Chris Slater; Jessie Williams
- Theme music composer: Jeremy Holland-Smith
- Country of origin: United Kingdom
- No. of episodes: 5

Production
- Executive producer: Lucy Martin
- Producer: Mark Reynaud
- Running time: 4 minutes

Original release
- Network: CBBC
- Release: 16 November – 20 November 2015

Related
- The Dumping Ground; Tracy Beaker Returns

The Dumping Ground Dish Up is a five-part CBBC television miniseries featuring various previous Dumping Ground characters showing you how to cook different dishes, which aired online and on TV from 16–20 November 2015.

== Cast ==
- Joe Maw as Johnny Taylor
- Jessie Williams as Lily Kettle
- Christopher Slater as Frank Matthews
- Saffron Coomber as Sapphire Fox
- Jessica Revell as Elektra Perkins

== Episodes ==
| No. overall | Title | Directed by | Written by | Original release date | UK viewers (millions) |
|---|---|---|---|---|---|
| 1 | "Sapphire's Stir-Fry" | Mark Reynaud | Sarah-Louise Hawkins | 16 November 2015 | N/A |
| 2 | "Frank's Meatballs" | Mark Reynaud | Sarah-Louise Hawkins | 17 November 2015 | N/A |
| 3 | "Elektra's Fruit Kebabs" | Mark Reynaud | Sarah-Louise Hawkins | 18 November 2015 | N/A |
| 4 | "Johnny's Omelette" | Mark Reynaud | Sarah-Louise Hawkins | 19 November 2015 | N/A |
| 5 | "Lily's Fish Fingers" | Mark Reynaud | Sarah-Louise Hawkins | 20 November 2015 | N/A |
