= Daniel Pearson (actor) =

Daniel Pearson in an English actor

- Born: Daniel Pearson; 16 July 1996 (age 30); Darlington, England
- Occupations: Actor and presenter
- Years active: 2010–2014

Daniel Pearson (born 16 July 1996) is an English actor and presenter, best known for his role as Rick Barber in the BAFTA-winning British children's television series Tracy Beaker Returns and in its BAFTA-winning spinoff series, The Dumping Ground.

== Career ==
Pearson's first role was in 2010 as young Chris Winter in detective television show Vera. In 2012, he starred as main character Rick Barber in the hugely popular, BAFTA winning, children's television series Tracy Beaker Returns, a comedy drama based around the lives of children in care. In 2012 and 2013, Daniel co-presented BAFTA award-winning British children's entertainment television programme Friday Download, as a replacement for Tyger Drew Honey. In 2013, he reprised his role as Rick Barber in The Dumping Ground, a spin-off of Tracy Beaker Returns. The show won a BAFTA for Best Children's Drama 2013. Also in 2013, Pearson had a recurring role as Luke Salter in the ITV soap opera Emmerdale. He also starred as Rick in the second series of The Dumping Ground, which aired from January to March 2014. His character did not return for the third series, and it was established a few months later in June 2014 that Pearson had planned to take an extended break from acting as he wanted to think about whether it was for him or not. Although announcing on a Facebook fanpage in late 2014 that he would return to acting in 2015, he has not starred in any TV shows or films since. As of 2025, an old Facebook fanpage, which was run by his mum, Nina, confirms that he did, in fact, leave acting, and now works in recruitment.

== Personal life ==
At the age of 3, Pearson moved with his family from Darlington to Tadcaster in North Yorkshire, where he has lived ever since with his brother Adam. He took an interest in acting at the age of 12. He joined Kreative talent agency where he gained his first TV role in Vera.

== Filmography ==
Year	Title	Role	Notes
2011	Vera	Young Chris Winter	One episode – guest role
2012	Tracy Beaker Returns	Rick Barber	Regular role (series 3)
2012–2013	Friday Download	Himself	Main presenter
2013–2014	The Dumping Ground	Rick Barber	Regular role (series 1 and 2)
2013	Emmerdale	Luke Salter	Seven episodes – recurring role
2014	The Dumping Ground Survival Files	Rick Barber	Regular role
