= Jessica Revell =

English actress and singer

- Born: 13 December 1994 (age 31); Ascot, Berkshire, England
- Education: Tring Park School for the Performing Arts, Royal Academy of Dramatic Art
- Occupations: Actress, singer
- Years active: 2010–present
- Known for: The role of "Elektra" Perkins
- Television: Tracy Beaker Returns (2011–2012); The Dumping Ground (2013, 2017, 2020); After The DG (2018)

Jessica Revell (born 13 December 1994) is an English actress and singer, best known for her TV role as Mandy "Elektra" Perkins in Tracy Beaker Returns and in the BBC spin-off series The Dumping Ground.

Revell's parents, who are separated, both worked for British Airways, and she has a brother. Revell spent her childhood travelling due to her parents' jobs and spent some of her childhood in France. Revell returned to the United Kingdom and attended Tring Park School for the Performing Arts as a boarding student. She graduated from the Royal Academy of Dramatic Art in 2023.

Revell's first role was in Tracy Beaker Returns as Elektra Perkins, and she joined in series 2. She reprised the role of Elektra for The Dumping Ground in 2013. She also appeared as Elektra in The Dumping Ground Survival Files and The Dumping Ground Dish Up. In 2015, she appeared in an episode of Casualty as Kelly Bange. Revell appeared in two short roles, Girl to Girl to Monkey in 2014, and in Mingmong as Judy in 2015. She also played Jen in the play People Are Messy.

== Filmography ==
Year	Title	Role	Notes
2011–2012	Tracy Beaker Returns	Elektra Perkins	Regular role
2012	Tracy Beaker Survival Files	Elektra Perkins	Regular role
2013	The Dumping Ground	Elektra Perkins	Regular role
2017, 2020	The Dumping Ground	Elektra Perkins	Guest role
2014	Girl to Girl to Monkey	Monkey	Short
2015	Casualty	Kelly Bange	1 episode
2015	Mingmong	Judy	Short
2015	The Dumping Ground Dish Up	Elektra Perkins	5 episodes
2016	People are Messy	Jen	
2017	Sam & Mark's Big Friday Wind-Up	Herself	1 episode
2017	Doctors	Erin Allsopp	1 episode
2018	After The DG	Elektra Perkins	Main role
