= Noah Marullo =

British actor

- Born: Noah Marullo; 23 June 1999 (age 27); United States
- Occupation: Actor
- Years active: 2008–present

Noah Marullo (born 23 June 1999) is an American-British actor from Flax Bourton, England. Marullo is best known for his role in CBBC's Tracy Beaker Returns and its spin-off series, The Dumping Ground as Gus Carmichael, a character with Autism, but has also appeared in Channel Four's Free Agents and the film Last Chance Harvey.

== Career ==
Marullo was born in the United States into an Italian-American family. He emigrated to the United Kingdom with his family in 2005, settling in Flax Bourton, England. In 2008, Marullo auditioned for the role in romantic comedy Last Chance Harvey. Marullo spent five days filming in London. Last Chance Harvey, which also starred Dustin Hoffman and Emma Thompson, was released in 2009. Aged nine, Marullo had his first television acting experience, appearing as Billy, the son of Stephen Mangan, in the Channel Four comedy series Free Agents.

In 2009, he was given the role of Gus Carmichael in the CBBC show Tracy Beaker Returns, a sequel to The Story of Tracy Beaker. He spent the Summer 2009 filming for the show in Newcastle, which was shown weekly at the beginning of 2010. He said "I had a fantastic summer filming Tracy Beaker and have made lots of new friends on set". His character, Gus, has autism spectrum disorder, which Marullo said was "what is so great about Tracy Beaker: it helps children understand that everyone is different".

He played the role of Gus Carmichael for the full three seasons of Tracy Beaker Returns and he reprised the role in The Dumping Ground for the opening episodes. The character left the programme after being fostered.

== Filmography ==
| Year | Title | Character | Notes |
|---|---|---|---|
| 2008 | Last Chance Harvey | Silent Boy | |
| 2009 | Free Agents | Billy | |
| 2010 | Tracy Beaker Returns | Gus Carmichael | Series regular |
| 2013 | The Dumping Ground | Gus Carmichael | 5 episodes |
