= The Dumping Ground Survival Files =

- Title card
- Genre: Children; Comedy drama
- Starring: Amy-Leigh Hickman; Miles Butler-Hughton; Leanne Dunstan; Joe Maw; Philip Graham Scott; Mia McKenna-Bruce; Jessie Williams; Sarah Rayson; Reece Buttery; Kia Pegg; Daniel Pearson; Akuc Bol; Kasey McKellar; Chris Slater; Carma Hylton; Hannah Moncur; Leo James; Cole Wealleans-Watts; Emily Burnett; Ruben Ruter; Annabelle Davis; Jasmine Uson; Chloe Lea; Connor Byrne; Stacy Liu
- Theme music composer: Jeremy Howlland-Smith
- Country of origin: United Kingdom
- No. of series: 3
- No. of episodes: 15

Production
- Producers: John Piper; Lis Steele
- Running time: 30 minutes

Original release
- Network: CBBC
- Release: 6 January 2014 – 4 December 2020

Related
- Tracy Beaker Survival Files; The Story of Tracy Beaker; Tracy Beaker Returns; The Dumping Ground; My Mum Tracy Beaker

The Dumping Ground Survival Files is a CBBC television miniseries featuring various Dumping Ground characters giving information on how to survive in the Dumping Ground. The show was made to accompany Series 2 of The Dumping Ground, it shows archive footage from Tracy Beaker Returns and interviews with characters.

Due to the COVID-19 pandemic, The Dumping Ground had to have a transmission break, and therefore, a third series of The Dumping Ground Survival Files was commissioned, with filming being done remotely and on the set of The Dumping Ground. Series 3 began on 6 November 2020 and aired during the transmission break of Series 8.

== Episodes ==
=== Series 1 (2014) ===
No.	Title	Directed by	Written by	Original release date	Viewers (millions)
1	"Promises"	Pip Banyard	Emma Reeves	6 January 2014	0.30>
2	"Being the Boss"	Pip Banyard	Emma Reeves	7 January 2014	0.30>
3	"Revenge"	Pip Banyard	Emma Reeves	8 January 2014	0.30>
4	"Truth"	Pip Banyard	Emma Reeves	9 January 2014	0.30>
5	"Change"	Pip Banyard	Emma Reeves	10 January 2014	0.35

=== Series 2 (2014) ===
No.	Title	Directed by	Written by	Original release date	Viewers (millions)
1	"Teamwork"	Pip Banyard	Julie Dixon	8 December 2014	0.19
2	"Challenges"	Pip Banyard	Julie Dixon	9 December 2014	0.19>
3	"Coming Clean"	Pip Banyard	Julie Dixon	10 December 2014	0.19>
4	"Big Decisions"	Pip Banyard	Julie Dixon	11 December 2014	0.20
5	"Second Chances"	Pip Banyard	Julie Dixon	12 December 2014	0.19>

=== Series 3 (2020) ===
No.	Title	Directed by	Written by	Original release date	Viewers (millions)
1	"Secrets & Lies"	Rob Jenkinson	Jordan Barrett	6 November 2020	0.07>
2	"Competitions"	Rob Jenkinson	Jordan Barrett	13 November 2020	0.07>
3	"Romance & Relationships"	Rob Jenkinson	Jordan Barrett	20 November 2020	0.07>
4	"Growing Up"	Rob Jenkinson	Jordan Barrett	27 November 2020	0.06>
5	"Family"	Rob Jenkinson	Jordan Barrett	4 December 2020	0.08>
