= List of The Story of Tracy Beaker (franchise) spin-offs =

The Story of Tracy Beaker is a British children's drama media franchise that focuses on the lives and experiences of young people and their care workers in care. This is a list of spin-off's to the trilogy of CBBC children's drama series The Story of Tracy Beaker, Tracy Beaker Returns and The Dumping Ground, which have spanned nineteen years between them.

== Spin-offs overview ==
Series	Episodes	Originally released	
Series	Episodes	First released	Last released
Tracy Beaker: The Movie of Me		21 February 2004	
Tracy Beaker Survival Files		16 December 2011	6 January 2012
Jody In Wonderland		16 December 2013	
The Dumping Ground Survival Files		6 January 2014	4 December 2020
Liam's Story		17 January 2014	14 March 2014; 23 March 2014 (TV)
The Dumping Ground Dish Up		16 November 2015	20 November 2015
The Dumping Ground: I'm...		25 January 2016	9 February 2017
Floss The Foundling		25 March 2016	
Dumping Ground Island		22 December 2017	
Sasha's Contact Meeting		6 April 2018	
After The DG		16 July 2018	4 August 2018
The Joseph & Taz Files		27 August 2018	

== The Story of Tracy Beaker ==
=== Tracy Beaker: The Movie of Me ===
Tracy Beaker: The Movie of Me title card

Tracy Beaker: The Movie of Me is a television movie and a spin-off to The Story of Tracy Beaker that broadcast on 22 February 2004 on BBC One, outside of the CBBC programming block. The film was shot in Cardiff, Wales, with scenes at Castell Coch, train journey and railway station scenes at the now closed Barry Tourist Railway and London, England including The London Eye and Paddington Station. The movie was released on DVD on 25 July 2005.

Originally broadcast part-way through the release of Series 3, the exact placement of this story in the wider continuity of the series is debatable. The Dumping Ground is as it appears in Series 2, with the subtle additions introduced in the third series being absent (notably, the repainting of the living room from beige to blue). After The Movie of Me was finished in January 2004, production moved to Skomer Care Home (Cliffside) in Penarth due to management changes. This suggests that the special was filmed prior to Series 3, despite featuring cast members that would only be introduced in the following episodes. The story presumably took place before Series 4, as Tracy appears to be living with Cam at the start of the fourth series. The story likely does not take place during the events of Series 3, however. A number of cast members from Series 3 are absent from the movie (most notably Bouncer appearing but Lol, Michael and Nathan being absent, although Jackie, Hayley, Crash, Layla, Marco and Shelley, who joined in Series 3, seem to be in this film), suggesting that this story takes place some time after the events of that series. Despite being aired while the third season was still airing, the episode would have to take place in-between the third and fourth season, given that Tracy is still living at the DG at the end of series 3 and is now living with Cam at the start of series 4. This creates a continuity error as Justine is shown to be living at the Dumping Ground in the movie, even though she left to live with her dad after the episode Good as Gold (the series 3 finale).

==== Cast ====
- Dani Harmer as Tracy Beaker
- Lisa Coleman as Cam Lawson
- Ruth Gemmell as Carly Beaker
- Darragh Mortell as Crash
- Montanna Thompson as Justine Littlewood
- Jack Edwards as Marco Maloney
- Ben Hanson as Bouncer Plakova
- Abby Rakic-Platt as Jackie Hopper
- Kristal Lau as Hayley
- Cara Readle as Layla
- Nisha Nayar as Elaine Boyak
- Nicola Reynolds as Shelley Appleton
- Clive Rowe as Duke Ellington
- Huw Llyr as PC Mark
- Katie Hiam as WPC Tina
- Sara Carver as Gloria
- Ian Ralph as Delivery Man
- Noisecandy as Band
- Huw Garmon as Derek
- Ieuan Rhys as Police Sergeant
- Jennie Lucey as Young Mum
- Peter Turnbull as Train Guard
- Simon Nehan as Security Guard
- Keisha White as Film Star's PA
- Lee Mengo as 1st AD
- Martin Cole as Director
- Michelle Luther as Helen

No. overall	Title	Directed by	Written by	Original release date	UK viewers (millions)
TBA	"Tracy Beaker: The Movie of Me"	Joss Agnew	Mary Morris	21 February 2004	N/A
Three days prior to her thirteenth birthday, Tracy books two bouncy castles and arranges band auditions, which angers Shelley, who is further annoyed by Tracy when she is unimpressed with a chocolate sponge for her birthday cake and Tracy's large birthday plans. Upon visiting Cam, Tracy storms out when she believes Cam is excluding her, but Cam catches up with her to reveal her birthday surprise for Tracy, which is wanting to be her foster mother. At Tracy's leaving party, Tracy is shocked when her mother, Carly, turns up and Tracy throws fizzy pop at her; Tracy later apologises to Carly and Carly tells Tracy about a potential job on a film and suggests they go to London. Carly is delighted when she lands a film job. Elaine is furious that Tracy was allowed to go with Carly, that she did not interview Carly or that the time they will be back is unknown. Whilst in London, Carly and Tracy talk about their past and Tracy decides to forgive Carly before heading to a café, run by Carly's friend, Gloria, and Carly tells Tracy about the film. On their way back to The Dumping Ground, Carly leaves Tracy and upon her return, Tracy is questioned by Cam, Elaine and Shelley about her day with Carly and she tells the young people that she is going to live with Carly. Crash tells Cam about Carly planning to take Tracy and upon arriving to collect Tracy, Elaine questions Carly about where she is going with Tracy as it is procedure, angering Carly. As Carly leaves, she meets Cam and finds out about Cam's plans to foster Tracy and Tracy is devastated when Carly leaves without her and Tracy rows with Crash about his interference. The next morning, Tracy is discovered to be missing from The Dumping Ground and the young people agree to keep quiet about what they know and the police are called; Bouncer falls for the female police officer, Tina. When Tracy goes to see Gloria, Gloria tells Tracy that Carly has gone to Hopeston to work on the film. When the police suggest searching Tracy's room, Hayley handcuffs herself to Mark, the male police officer, whilst some of the others destroy things from Tracy's day in London. Tracy fare-dodges to get on a train to Hopeston and when Tracy contacts them on Justine's mobile, which she took, Tracy exaggerates to Crash, prompting him to join Tracy in Hopeston, and she stops and escapes the train, as well as releasing pigeons, when the conductor asks for tickets. Later, Tracy calls Cam, who is devastated when Tracy tells Cam she wants to be with Carly all the time, so Cam spends the night at The Dumping Ground and Crash finds Tracy at the train station in Hopeston. The following day, Crash gives Tracy a necklace for her birthday and Justine finds out about the location of the film in Hopeston and Cam scares Justine, when she overhears and demands to know where Tracy is. Shelley, Duke, Jackie, the police and Bouncer follow Cam and Justine to Hopeston. Tracy and Crash sneak onto the film set and when Carly falls off a horse, Tracy confronts the crew about putting Carly in danger, but they reveal Carly is the stunt double and Carly tells her she may have a surprise for her later. Everyone arrives at the film set when filming has finished and are relieved to find out Tracy and Crash are at a nearby motel. Later, Tracy is picked up by a pink limousine and is amazed when the film set has been transformed for a birthday party; Tracy wrongly assumes Carly organised it as the surprise, but it was Cam. Cam agrees to take Tracy to see Carly and Tracy informs Carly it is her thirteenth birthday, which is forgotten by Carly, and she wants Carly's permission to be fostered by Cam. Back at her birthday party, Carly later arrives and Carly allows Cam to foster Tracy. Mark and his wife, Helen, arrive at The Dumping Ground to see Hayley and invite her out with them.

== Tracy Beaker Returns ==
=== Tracy Beaker Survival Files ===
Tracy Beaker Survival Files title card

Tracy Beaker Survival Files is a spin-off to Tracy Beaker Returns that broadcast on 16 December 2011 and ended on 6 January 2012 on CBBC. It consists of thirteen, thirty-minute episodes and is the first and only Tracy Beaker Returns spin-off. It is an accompanying miniseries to Tracy Beaker Returns Series 2 & 3, with archive footage from The Story of Tracy Beaker.

==== Cast ====
- Dani Harmer as Tracy Beaker
- Jack Elton as Jack
- Saffron Coomber as Sapphire Fox
- Amy-Leigh Hickman as Carmen Howle
- Mia McKenna-Bruce as Tee Taylor
- Joe Maw as Johnny Taylor
- Philip Graham Scott as Harry Jones
- Connor Byrne as Mike Milligan
- Kay Purcell as Gina Conway
- Noah Marullo as Gus Carmichael
- Jessica Revell as Elektra Perkins
- Jessie Williams as Lily Kettle
- Richard Wisker as Liam O'Donovan
- Lisa Coleman as Cam Lawson
- Chris Slater as Frank Matthews

==== Episodes ====
No.	Title	Directed by	Written by	Original release date
1	"Falling Out"	TBA	TBA	16 December 2011
2	"Romance"	TBA	TBA	17 December 2011
3	"Persuasion"	TBA	TBA	18 December 2011
4	"Anger"	TBA	TBA	19 December 2011
5	"Fear"	TBA	TBA	20 December 2011
6	"Rules"	TBA	TBA	21 December 2011
7	"Doing the Right Thing"	TBA	TBA	22 December 2011
8	"Siblings"	TBA	TBA	23 December 2011
9	"Responsibility"	TBA	TBA	2 January 2012
10	"Lies"	TBA	TBA	3 January 2012
11	"First Impressions"	TBA	TBA	4 January 2012
12	"Secrets"	TBA	TBA	5 January 2012
13	"Goodbyes"	TBA	TBA	6 January 2012

== The Dumping Ground ==
=== Jody In Wonderland ===
Jody In Wonderland is a spin-off to The Dumping Ground that broadcast on 16 December 2013 on CBBC; it aired between the first and second series. The episode is sixty minutes in length and is the first The Dumping Ground spin-off.

==== Cast ====
- Connor Byrne as Mike Milligan
- Chris Slater as Frank Matthews
- Daniel Pearson as Rick Barber
- Jessie Williams as Lily Kettle
- Amy-Leigh Hickman as Carmen Howle
- Kia Pegg as Jody Jackson
- Mia McKenna-Bruce as Tee Taylor
- Joe Maw as Johnny Taylor
- Miles Butler-Hughton as Tyler Lewis
- Leanne Dunstan as Faith Davis
- Sarah Rayson as Floss Guppy
- Reece Buttery as Mo Michaels
- Stacy Liu as May-Li Wang
- Philip Graham Scott as Harry Jones
- Victoria Alcock as Denise Jackson
- James Bartlett as Luke Jackson
- David Avery as Kingsley Jackson

No. overall	Title	Directed by	Written by	Original release date	UK viewers (millions)
14	"Jody in Wonderland"	Nigel Douglas	Elly Brewer	16 December 2013	0.50
Jody is faced with a terrible dilemma when she's asked to make a witness statement against her brother Kingsley. Jody leaves Mike's office seeing a rabbit. Following the rabbit, she enters a rather unfamiliar world with strangely familiar – yet utterly different – characters.

=== Liam's Story ===
Liam's Story is a CBBC webseries, airing with the second series of The Dumping Ground. The last episode is also the finale of that series, although some lines and scenes differ from each other.

=== Floss The Foundling ===
Floss The Foundling is a spin-off and crossover with Hetty Feather and a spin-off to The Dumping Ground that broadcast on 25 March 2016 on BBC iPlayer; it aired at the end of the first half of the fourth series. The episode is five-minutes in length and is the sixth The Dumping Ground spin-off.

==== Cast ====
- Sarah Rayson as Floss Guppy
- Isabel Clifton as Hetty Feather
- Stacy Liu as May-Li Wang
- Miles Butler-Hughton as Tyler Lewis
- Nelly Currant as Toni Trent
- Gwen Currant as Billie Trent
- Eva Pope as Matron Bottomley
- Polly Allen as Sheila Ormsby
- Isabelle Allen as Elizabeth

No. overall	Title	Directed by	Written by	Original release date
TBA	"Floss The Foundling"	Makalla McPherson	Matt Evans	25 March 2016
When Floss has to do the vacuuming. she ruins a picture that Tyler, Billie and Toni work on when they don't want her help. Floss falls asleep on the sofa and ends up in the Foundling Hospital. She encounters Hetty Feather, who introduces Floss to the Foundling Hospital ways. Sheila and Elizabeth are mean towards Floss and Hetty gets Floss out of trouble with Matron Bottomley. Floss and Hetty make friends. When Floss wakes up, she draws a replacement picture.

=== Dumping Ground Island ===
Dumping Ground Island is a spin-off to The Dumping Ground that broadcast on 22 December 2017 on CBBC; it aired at the end of the fifth series. The episode is sixty-minutes in length and is the seventh spin-off to The Dumping Ground. It is filmed in the North East of England as well as Crete, Greece and is the first episode across the Tracy Beaker franchise that has been filmed abroad.

==== Cast ====
- Miles Butler-Hughton as Tyler Lewis
- Kia Pegg as Jody Jackson
- Lewis Hamilton as Ryan Reeves
- Sarah Rayson as Floss Guppy
- Annabelle Davis as Sasha Bellman
- Alexander Aze as Dexter Bellman
- Stacy Liu as May-Li Wang

No. overall	Title	Directed by	Written by	Original release date	UK viewers (millions)
90	"Dumping Ground Island"	David Innes Edwards	Owen Lloyd-Fox	22 December 2017	N/A
The young people talk to Tyler about their problems for the Kids in Care forum and he is pressured into solving them. May-Li is concerned about Tyler's lack of sleep over his work for his podcast and suggests he interviews the young people. Floss wants Ryan to teach her to be evil. Tyler daydreams when Jody asks for his help with her mum and Tyler tells Jody about an island he dreams he could run away to. For his podcast, Tyler insults the young people using false names and after Ryan finds Tyler's notes for the forum in the bin, Ryan distracts him away. Ryan shares the podcast recording with the young people and Tyler escapes to his room to dream about the island. Tyler finds himself on his dreamm island and explores, swims and climbs, but he isn't happy when Jody, Ryan, Sasha and Dexter turn up and Ryan and Jody insist Tyler is in charge to find food. Floss later arrives on the island. Ryan finds a fridge with fruit and fills up his bag, but when he returns to the young people, he refuses to share. In the cave, Tyler's laptop plays a message to him and Ryan agrees to share the food if they build the shelter. Sasha and Dexter fall out when Sasha calls Dexter names and Sasha works out Jody likes Tyler. Back at the cave, Tyler thinks he has bipolar and Ryan winds Jody up about Tyler not liking her. Jody goes to the cave and tells Tyler it's her birthday and her mum forgot. Tyler rubbishes what Ryan said and kisses Jody, which shocks her, but Jody kisses Tyler back. When Tyler snaps out of his dream, he tells Dexter that Sasha cares about him, he gets Ryan to teach Floss how to be evil and leaves Jody a birthday card.

=== Sasha's Contact Meeting ===
Sasha's Contact Meeting is a miniseries of webisodes and spin-off to The Dumping Ground that broadcast on 6 April 2018 on BBC iPlayer; it aired at the end of the first half of the sixth series. The series consists of five episodes and is the eight spin-off to The Dumping Ground.

==== Cast ====
- Annabelle Davis as Sasha Bellman
- Endy McKay as Jenny Holmes

No. overall	Title	Directed by	Written by	Original release date	UK viewers (millions)
1	"Sasha's Contact Meeting: Episode 1"	Michael J Ferns	Lauren Sequeira	6 April 2018	N/A
Sasha tells her vlog viewers that she has had to miss a trip to the theme park to see her social worker, Maureen. Sasha goes to see Maureen, but finds another woman there, who introduces herself as Jenny Holmes and her new social worker. Sasha insists she does not need a pathway plan as she knows what she wants to do, but tells her vlog viewers the meeting will not last long.
2	"Sasha's Contact Meeting: Episode 2"	Michael J Ferns	Lauren Sequeira	6 April 2018	N/A
Sasha tells Jenny that she feels meeting will not be worth it for her. When Jenny asks Sasha about her education, Sasha plans to study Art, but Jenny wants proper answers from Sasha. Sasha attempts to question Jenny about her being a social worker, but Jenny wants to focus on the plan. Jenny then asks Sasha about what she will do for money, but Sasha refuses to answer. When Jenny is out of the room, Sasha pours water over her documents and then wants to film her reaction, but Jenny notices the phone. Jenny insists they are going to complete the plan.
3	"Sasha's Contact Meeting: Episode 3"	Michael J Ferns	Lauren Sequeira	6 April 2018	N/A
Jenny tells Sasha she has to respect people's privacy and Sasha chooses to ignore Jenny's request by using her phone. Sasha rubbishes Jenny's belief that she is scared and tells Jenny her interests. Jenny then asks Sasha about where she will live when she has left care as she knows Sasha chose not to live with her mum, asking if she wants to live independently. Jenny brings up Sasha's anger, which is the same way she acted when she was going to live in secure accommodation, and Sasha denies she is angry.
4	"Sasha's Contact Meeting: Episode 4"	Michael J Ferns	Lauren Sequeira	6 April 2018	N/A
When Jenny tries to talk about Sasha's emotions, Sasha insists she is in control and independent and walks out of her meeting. She locks herself in her bedroom and turns up her music to get Jenny to leave her alone. Jenny leaves Sasha a note, telling her she is in the garden and an emotional Sasha destroys her canvas.
5	"Sasha's Contact Meeting: Episode 5"	Michael J Ferns	Lauren Sequeira	6 April 2018	N/A
Sasha joins Jenny in the garden and Jenny attempts to guess how Sasha feels so she talks. Sasha admits to Jenny she does and does not regret moving back in with her family, but knows it was right not to and has to be independent as well as admitting she is scared. Jenny reassures Sasha that it is normal to feel guilty about putting herself first instead of her family. Sasha also admits she misses Josh and feels like she is the same person she was when she arrived and her anger messes things up. Jenny praises Sasha for talking and encourages her to talk to people.
