= The Dumping Ground series 3 =

The Dumping Ground
- Series 3
- Series Three Title Card
- Starring: Connor Byrne; Amy-Leigh Hickman; Philip Graham Scott; Mia McKenna-Bruce; Joe Maw; Miles Butler-Hughton; Kia Pegg; Sarah Rayson; Reece Buttery; Stacy Liu; Kasey McKellar; Akuc Bol; Lewis Hamilton; Nelly Currant; Gwen Currant; Ruben Reuter; Annabelle Davis
- No. of episodes: 20

Release
- Original network: CBBC; CBBC HD
- Original release: 16 January – 8 December 2015

Series chronology
- ← Previous; Series 2 Next → Series 4

The third series of the British children's television series The Dumping Ground began broadcasting on 16 January 2015 on CBBC and ended on 8 December 2015. The series follows the lives of the children living in the fictional children's care home of Ashdene Ridge, nicknamed by them "The Dumping Ground". It consists of twenty, thirty-minute episodes, airing in two halves in January and October 2015. It is the eleventh series in The Story of Tracy Beaker franchise.

== Cast ==
All of the cast from the show's second series returned, with the exceptions of Daniel Pearson, who played Rick Barber, left in the series 2 finale. Leanne Dunstan, who played Faith Davis, also left the series, but returned for respite care. Chris Slater reprised his role as Frank Matthews in episode 20 "Refuge" for a guest appearance.

=== Main ===
- Connor Byrne as Mike Milligan
- Amy-Leigh Hickman as Carmen Howle
- Phillip Graham Scott as Harry Jones
- Mia McKenna-Bruce as Tee Taylor
- Joe Maw as Johnny Taylor (episodes 1-10 only)
- Miles Butler-Hughton as Tyler Lewis
- Kia Pegg as Jody Jackson
- Sarah Rayson as Floss Guppy
- Reece Buttery as Mo Michaels
- Stacy Liu as May-Li Wang
- Kasey McKellar as Bailey Wharton
- Akuc Bol as Kazima Tako
- Lewis Hamilton as Ryan Reeves (from episode 2)
- Nelly Currant as Toni Trent (from episode 3)
- Gwen Currant as Billie Trent (from episode 3)
- Sage as Mischief (from episode 4)
- Ruben Reuter as Finn McLaine (from episode 9)
- Annabelle Davis as Sasha Bellman (from episode 11)

=== Guest ===
- Amer Nazir as Police Officer
- Chris William Chris as Chad Wild Clay
- Charlie Brooks as Stephanie Brantson
- Stuart Manning as Matt Brantson
- Grant Burgin as Mr. Gordon
- Tonya French as Mrs. Gordon
- Martina Laird as Mrs. Underwood
- Kiki Brooks-Truman as Maude Gordon
- Diveen Henry as Sally Lewis
- Dai Bradley as Mal
- Avin Shah as Clive
- Simeon Zack as Roscoe Hayden
- Christopher Connel as Security Guard
- Sarah Lewis Obuba as Police Officer
- Geff Francis as Dave
- Ray Emmet Brown as Adam Aycliffe
- Indra Ove as Sylvie
- Dallas Campbell as Himself
- Natifa Mai as Maz
- Frankie Wilson as Max
- Isabelle Burrows-Brown as Claire Aycliffe
- Sally Rogers as Lucy Taylor
- Holly & Paige Robinson as Hope Taylor
- Neil Morrissey as Keith Taylor
- Alexander Aze as Dexter Bellman
- Thomas and Oliver Waldram as Murphy Bellman
- Sandy Foster as Kelly Bellman
- Shameem Ahmed as H&S Inspector
- Angela Murray as Trampoline Assessor
- Kemi-Bo Jacobs as Abi
- Leanne Dunstan as Faith Davis
- Quinton Nyirenda as Laces
- Simon Rouse as David Michaels
- Donna Lavin as Caroline Michaels
- Colin Young as Peter Michaels
- Imogen Faires as Chanelle
- Ashley Artus as Andy
- Sam Cassidy as Plumber/Fireman
- Pik-Sen Lim as PoPo
- Dolya Gavanski as Jasna
- Nisha Joshi as Herself
- Christopher Slater as Frank Matthews
- Richard Pepple as Hakim Tako

=== Casting ===
Casting calls confirmed that there would feature 7 new characters, including; twins Toni and Billie, played by Nelly and Gwen Currant; dog Mischief, which CBBC ran a competition for viewers to name it and is played by Sage; a disabled character called Finn, as well as Sasha, Dexter and Ryan, played by Ruben Reuter, Annabelle Davis, Alexander Aze and Lewis Hamilton respectively. This series also saw the final appearance of Joe Maw as Johnny Taylor in the part 1 finale "Dragon Slayer".

== Episodes ==
| No. overall | No. in series | Title | Directed by | Written by | Original release date | UK viewers (millions) |
|---|---|---|---|---|---|---|
Part 1
| 28 | 1 | "Party Games (Law and Disorder - Part 1)" | Roberto Bangura | Emma Reeves | 16 January 2015 | 0.27 |
Today at Ashdene Ridge, there is a foster party. However, soon chaos springs out of nowhere as Carmen and Bailey battle over foster parents. Meanwhile, Jody is trying to convince Harry to try and get fostered, but once Jody meets a wrestling mad family, Harry's all over it. Tyler doesn't want to get fostered and Mo does something silly.
| 29 | 2 | "Grand Theft DG (Law and Disorder - Part 2)" | Roberto Bangura | Emma Reeves | 16 January 2015 | 0.27 |
New resident Ryan proves he is a force to be reckoned with. He wants the spare bedroom that Johnny has, so turns Sherlock to find out who stole the wallets from the party. Meanwhile, Harry goes to meet his new foster family, but when it's discovered its their daughter who stole the wallets, it's sad news for Harry - they don't think its right to adopt him after that. First Appearance: Lewis Hamilton as Ryan Reeves
| 30 | 3 | "Stuck with You" | Roberto Bangura | Sarah-Louise Hawkins | 23 January 2015 | 0.30 |
Carmen and Jody have a row over how should get a musical box. The row gets so bad, that Floss handcuffs them together. Not a big calamity, but then Floss loses the key! Meanwhile, Toni and Billie move into the dumping ground. First Appearance: Gwen Currant as Billie Trent and Nelly Currant as Toni Trent
| 31 | 4 | "Mischief" | Roberto Bangura | Dawn Harrison | 30 January 2015 | 0.25 |
When Bailey bumps into a homeless man who later dies, he feels guilty, and decides to become the new owner of his dog Mischief. He has to save Mischief in a week, or Mischief will be put down! First Appearance: Sage as Mischief Absent: Reece Buttery as Mo Michaels
| 32 | 5 | "Now You See Me" | Nigel Douglas | Jane Eden | 6 February 2015 | 0.25 |
Tee is introduced to Kazima's street artist friend Roscoe and finds herself amazed by the world of art. However, Roscoe's only out for himself.
| 33 | 6 | "It's Not About the Money" | Roberto Bangura | Julie Dixon | 13 February 2015 | 0.25 |
When Tyler demands money for a magic trick, Ryan sets up an insurance scam involving the theft of the office computer which has Tee's project on it! Meanwhile, Harry's getting fostered, but Floss is taking Harry's departure badly, which leads to Jeff facing the Scissors again... Departed: Phillip-Graham Scott as Harry Jones
| 34 | 7 | "Fake it to Make It" | Nigel Douglas | Davey Jones | 20 February 2015 | 0.26 |
Carmen is annoyed when she finds out that she has to wear glasses as she has an audition at a modelling agency meanwhile Jody and Kazima make a volcano. Carmen upsets everyone she turns off Tyler the twins and Baileys game she orders Jody and Kazima she ties Mischef to a tree making Bailey angry but when Ryan sees Carmen ruining the volcano Jody and Kazima make she realises she's been selfish and upset everyone.
| 35 | 8 | "Breaking In" | Nigel Douglas | Jeff Povey | 27 February 2015 | 0.34 |
The residents of The Dumping Ground head off on a day trip to a theme park. Tee and Kazima are left behind and then burgurlars come looking for a mysterious package so they have to defend Ashdene Ridge. Absent: Sage as Mischief
| 36 | 9 | "The Long Way Home" | Nigel Douglas | Matthew Leys | 6 March 2015 | 0.27 |
Ryan goes on a mission to rescue his friend Harry after he receives a surprise text from him saying "Help".Meanwhile Tyler finds a trumpet in a skip and has troubled playing it and when Mike May-Li and the rest of the DG why Harry and Finn won’t go back to there foster home they find out what Adam there foster dad did to them and Mike tells him the boys won’t be returning to them ever again. First Appearance: Ruben Reuter as Finn McLaine Absent Jody Jackson Harry returns to Ashdene Ridge and Finn becomes a main character in this episode Returned: Phillip-Graham Scott as Harry Jones
| 37 | 10 | "Dragon Slayer" | Nigel Douglas | Julie Dixon | 13 March 2015 | 0.31 |
It's the day before Johnny is due to leave for the army. However, when his mum's boyfriend Keith comes out of prison and threatens the domestic stability that his mum has created for him, Tee and baby Hope and he finds that Mrs Taylor has been allowing him to visit, he has a big dilemma on his hands in terms of what to do with his stepfather and decides that it's time to settle an old score with Keith. Meanwhile, Toni and Billie find a rabbit in the garden. Last Appearance: Joe Maw as Johnny Taylor
Part 2
| 38 | 11 | "Three Days" | Matthew Evans | Dawn Harrison | 6 October 2015 | 0.35 |
A new girl called Sasha stops off on her way to a secure home. She starts causing trouble and problems for a lot of the residents when they are going on a trip to see Lilly but Sasha breaks the minibus lights. She tries to get a picture printed and Floss sets her up after she is made to share with Jody. First Appearance: Annabelle Davis as Sasha Bellman and Alexander Aze as Dexter Bellman
| 39 | 12 | "Free to Good Home" | Matthew Evans | Dawn Harrison | 13 October 2015 | 0.42 |
Sasha is allowed to stay at Ashdene Ridge as long as she stays within the rules, which proves to be difficult when she realises how her mischievous younger brother Dexter is struggling to cope at home when Sasha tells him to sort Murphy out there younger brother Dexter tells Sasha he can’t find nappies he goes to the shops only to shoplift them when Sasha catches him she tells him he’ll end up in care and Dexter said he couldn’t find money but when Sasha decides to steal the nappies Jody tells her to give her the bag because Sasha gets send to secure then May-Li and Mike find out what Jody did and she is banned from the shop. Meanwhile Floss Finn Harry Toni and Billie make a trampoline after everyone’s trip to see Lilly to cancelled but Finn has an accident and Mike tells the young ones off.
| 40 | 13 | "Better Than You" | Matthew Evans | Dawn Harrison | 20 October 2015 | 0.39 |
If Bailey passes his review meeting he gets tickets to Wembley. He calls on Faiths help when she temporarily returns to the dumping ground. Meanwhile Billie and Toni become enemies. Guest Appearance: Leanne Dunstan as Faith Davis
| 41 | 14 | "Who Are You?" | Matthew Evans | Davey Jones | 27 October 2015 | 0.35 |
Tee decides to look into Ryan's past to discredit him at his birthday party.
| 42 | 15 | "Where Is Love?" | Matthew Evans | Richard Lazarus | 3 November 2015 | 0.44 |
Mo secures the lead role in the school play. But his delight is short-lived when he hears that his father's ill. This leads to a surprise in his family history when his mum and dad turn up. In this episode, Mo's parents are shown to have cerebral palsy.
| 43 | 16 | "The Goodbye Girl" | Sallie Aprahamian | Jeff Povey | 10 November 2015 | 0.26 |
Tyler's plan to put on a great magic show leads him to a first love with Chanelle, the mysterious daughter of a magic shop owner.
| 44 | 17 | "Something Borrowed" | Sallie Aprahamian | Sophie Petzal | 17 November 2015 | 0.36 |
Carmen drops May Li's valuable antique necklace down the toilet. Now she's forced whether to tell the truth or lie. She imagines both scenarios.
| 45 | 18 | "What Matters?" | Sallie Aprahamian | Julie Dixon | 24 November 2015 | 0.36 |
Tee is determined to prove she can be a party animal when Sasha wants to take her to a party. They set up a plan to go to the party without no one seeing, but the plan goes wrong.
| 46 | 19 | "Coming Round" | Sallie Aprahamian | Jane Eden | 1 December 2015 | 0.31 |
May-Li's grandmother PoPo turns up unexpectedly and she impresses the young people with her kung-fu, so she agrees to teach them some. Jody can't decide whether to send her mum a chance birthday card as she thinks she hasn't forgiveness her for testifying against Kingsley. PoPo suggests to Jody she writes a letter addressed to her mother about her feelings and then put the letter somewhere. PoPo wants May-Li to take over the family shop, but PoPo makes it clear that her adopted children are not her family which upsets May-Li. During a kung-fu contest, Jody and Ryan are the last contenders and Jody decides if she wins, she wants his frog and Ryan wants her music box if he wins, but Jody wins. May-Li is given a family heirloom, a diary, from PoPo, meaning she has accepted May-Li's partner and children.
| 47 | 20 | "Refuge" | Sallie Aprahamian | Emma Reeves | 8 December 2015 | 0.45 |
Kazima fails her age-assessment so Carmen gets the DG to get on telly to tell everyone about Kazima and got people to sign a petition to let Kazima stay. They get a lot of people to sign it but the person running the age assessment won't let it happen and she is ordered to return to Somalia so she runs away and then finds her Dad. Kazima returns to the DG with her Dad and then they learn from Carmen that someone has contact with her brother so her Father sets out to Somalia to find him. Guest Appearance: Chris Slater as Frank Matthews

== Production ==
This series featured scripts from Emma Reeves, Richard Lazarus and Sophie Petzal, among others. Philip Gladwin has been confirmed as the show's new script editor.

Philip Leach took over from Simon Nelson as producer and Lis Steele continued her position as executive producer. Roberto Bangura, who was worked on shows such as Waterloo Road has joined the directing team. Other directors that directed the series include; Nigel Douglas, who previously worked on The Dumping Ground; and former Wolfblood director, Matthew Evans.

Production began on 16 June 2014, and was completed on 10 November 2014.
