= The Dumping Ground series 4 =

The Dumping Ground
- Series 4
- Series Four Title Card
- Starring: Connor Byrne; Amy-Leigh Hickman; Philip Graham Scott; Mia McKenna-Bruce; Miles Butler-Hughton; Kia Pegg; Sarah Rayson; Reece Buttery; Stacy Liu; Kasey McKellar; Akuc Bol; Lewis Hamilton; Nelly Currant; Gwen Currant; Ruben Reuter; Annabelle Davis; Hannah Moncur; Yousef Naseer; Jethro Baliba
- No. of episodes: 20

Release
- Original network: CBBC; CBBC HD
- Original release: 29 January – 2 December 2016

Series chronology
- ← Previous; Series 3 Next → Series 5

The fourth series of the British children's television series The Dumping Ground began broadcasting on 29 January 2016 on CBBC and ended on 2 December 2016. The series follows the lives of the children living in the fictional children's care home of Ashdene Ridge, nicknamed by them "The Dumping Ground". It consists of twenty, thirty-minute episodes, airing in two halves in January and October 2016. It is the twelfth series in The Story of Tracy Beaker franchise.

== Cast ==
=== Main ===
- Connor Byrne as Mike Milligan
- Phillip Graham Scott as Harry Jones (episodes 1–12 and 19)
- Amy-Leigh Hickman as Carmen Howle (episodes 1–19)
- Mia McKenna-Bruce as Tee Taylor (episodes 1–19)
- Miles Butler-Hughton as Tyler Lewis
- Kia Pegg as Jody Jackson
- Sarah Rayson as Floss Guppy
- Reece Buttery as Mo Michaels
- Stacy Liu as May-Li Wang
- Kasey McKellar as Bailey Wharton
- Akuc Bol as Kazima Tako
- Lewis Hamilton as Ryan Reeves
- Nelly Currant as Toni Trent
- Gwen Currant as Billie Trent
- Sage as Mischief
- Ruben Reuter as Finn McLaine
- Annabelle Davis as Sasha Bellman
- Hannah Moncur as Chloe Reeves (episodes 5, 15–20)
- Yousef Naseer as Joseph Stubbs (episodes 15–20)
- Jethro Baliba as Archie Able (episodes 18–20)

=== Guest ===
- Tiana Benjamin as Briony
- Alison Hammond as Rowena Spike
- Kate Copeland as Lizzie Drewit
- Abas Eljanabi as Mr Twigg
- Mark Theodore as Jimmy Wharton
- Jordan Bolger as Zach Montgomery
- Ryan Wilkinson as Allen
- Phil Rowson as Alex White
- Hetty Baynes Russell as Drama Tutor
- Alexander Aze as Dexter Bellman
- Malique Thompson-Dwyer as Tommo
- Sandy Foster as Kelly Bellman
- Fred Montgomery Scott as Murphy Bellman
- Ian Kershaw as Peter
- Tanya Vital as Phoebe
- Liz Crowther as Mary
- Matt Kennard as Kerr
- Judith Alexander as Chair Person
- Warwick Davis as Lou
- Francesca Papagno as Ange
- Sheila Hancock as Doris
- Don Gallagher as Felix
- Duncan Bannatyne as himself
- Leah Walker as Hollie
- Roderick Gilkison as Sammy Doyle
- Chris Jack as Simon
- Guinness as Princess
- Calita Rainford as Iona
- Jane Holman as Aunt Peg
- Diveen Henry as Sally Lewis
- Isobel Steele as Kara
- Samuel Holland as Jim
- David Avery as Kingsley Jackson
- Lee Warburton as Gary
- Zoe Iqbal as Rosie

=== Casting ===
In March 2015, an open casting call was announced for the characters of Chloe Josephe Archie & Sammy who was in the DG for 3 episodes. The requirements for Chloe were for the actress to be a genuine wheelchair user aged between 10 and 14 years old, who could pass for 11 to 13 years old. Hannah Moncur was cast in the role.

== Episodes ==
| No. overall | No. in series | Title | Directed by | Written by | Original release date | UK viewers (millions) |
|---|---|---|---|---|---|---|
Part 1
| 48 | 1 | "Lost and Found (Slings and Arrows - Part 1)" | Sallie Aprahamian | Dawn Harrison | 29 January 2016 | 0.38 |
The young people watch in the audience at Bailey's football academy trial, hoping that he will land a scholarship there. However, it is later revealed that a woman who was watching with them, who they presumed to be an agent, is claiming to be his mum that abandoned him as a child. At first he doesn't want anything to do with her, however he later agrees to meet up with her and begins to imagine the relationship with his mum that he has always wanted, and so when she reveals that she lost her job when going to watch the match, he puts his name down on a flat for them to live in together with the money he is hoping to secure from the academy. Unfortunately, his plan to support himself and his mum is ruined when his manager reveals that he won't be offered a scholarship, forcing himself to stop dreaming about his future. Meanwhile, when OFSTED turn up at the Dumping Ground, the surprise inspection gets off to a shaky start, and worried that Ashdene Ridge may be closed down, the young people decide to stage a Shakespeare play of A Winter's Tale, but when they find a bag of stolen jewels in the bear prop from a local second hand shop, they begin to send the performance into a big dilemma.
| 49 | 2 | "Bear-Faced Liar (Slings and Arrows - Part 2)" | Sallie Aprahamian | Dawn Harrison | 29 January 2016 | 0.38 |
Following recent events, Bailey must break some bad news to his mum. Everyone must put on a Shakespeare play for Ofsted but they are still in turmoil about their discovery. Later, Bailey's father, Jimmy Wharton, turns up at Ashdene Ridge after hearing that Alison is back on the scene. But Bailey is in for a shock when he finds out that she isn't really his mum. The young people perform 'A Winter's Tale' to Ofsted, Mike and May-Li and it goes well. The story makes Bailey upset because it reminds him of when his mum walked out on him when he was a baby. In the end, everyone thinks Bailey has given up on his football dream. Playing it in the garden, they all stop when Bailey comes out but Bailey soon joins in.
| 50 | 3 | "Stepping Up" | Sallie Aprahamian | Sarah-Louise Hawkins | 5 February 2016 | 0.45 |
Carmen wants to enter a street dancing competition and Tee helps her. But when Jody starts competing against them, Carmen and Tee realize that they need Jody after all. But when Jody gets stage fright, she begins to feel that she can't do it. But a caring Carmen encourages Jody and helps her overcome her stage fright and before long, the trio are dancing for the DG gang! Meanwhile, when everything starts to fall apart in Ashdene Ridge, Harry, Toni and Billie try to help Mike fix it. But when Billie keeps breaking them so they don't run out of things to fix, her and Toni finally talk about their mum.
| 51 | 4 | "They Walk Among Us" | Sallie Aprahamian | Jeff Povey | 12 February 2016 | 0.31 |
Mo thinks there are aliens in the neighborhood, and makes Bailey believe him. But when everyone begins to tease Mo about it, he is determined to prove them wrong. He meets Allen, a fellow 'alien' that he found in the woods. They become good friends and build a radio together to contact Allen's father who is away on a job. Meanwhile, Tee is all in a frantic when fitness coach, Zach, asks her out. But she soon finds out he is all good to be true when he flirts with Carmen. Carmen and Sasha help Tee get revenge against him.
| 52 | 5 | "Hold the Front Page" | Sallie Aprahamian | Julie Dixon | 19 February 2016 | 0.26 |
Ryan receives a letter from his sister and runs upstairs with it, causing Finn to trip and fall, as he comes down. However, everyone believes Ryan pushed him. When Chloe turns up at the DG, Ryan feels nervous about meeting her for the first time since her accident. Certain he did something to put her in a wheelchair, Tee and Sasha spy on them while they speak. But it is revealed they got the wrong end of the stick. Meanwhile, Tyler wins a journalism competition. Chloe leaves Ashdene Ridge, promising to visit again. First Appearance: Hannah Moncur as Chloe Reeves
| 53 | 6 | "Growing Pains" | Sarah Walker | Matt Evans | 26 February 2016 | 0.36 |
Tee gets an interview for art college but is upset when they offer Carmen a place on the drama course. After getting cold feet about the interview, Tee walks out apologizing for 'wasting their time' and goes back to Ashdene Ridge, unaware that her artwork made the college give her a place on the art course. Tee burns all her artwork in anger. Meanwhile, Finn, Harry, Toni and Billie put posters up around town about them, to help them get new homes. Carmen tells Tee that she rang the college and pretended to be Tee to get Tee on the course she has always wanted. Tee then says that her and Carmen are best friends .
| 54 | 7 | "Submarine" | Sarah Walker | Ian Kershaw | 4 March 2016 | 0.27 |
Sasha decides to start an online vlog but she soon gets interrupted by Floss and the twins when they prank her. Sasha is told off for storming around the house but she argues back. After getting fed up of all the hassle she is getting, Sasha sets out to find her brother, Dexter, and they go off to the park where she sees an old friend. They hang out together for a while but she soon finds herself in trouble when he starts making her do things that she is unsure about. Sasha soon agrees to burgle the house but she is caught and is given a criminal record. Meanwhile, Carmen finds out it is Kazima's birthday so she organizes a party with everyone. But Kazima doesn't want one, which leads everyone to throw a party for a Somali singer.
| 55 | 8 | "First Past the Post" | Sarah Walker | Matthew Leys | 11 March 2016 | 0.26 |
Mike is struggling to keep up with work and ends up getting stressed and angry at the slightest thing. Meanwhile Tyler and Floss go head to head in an election with Mo and Jody as campaign managers. Floss keeps pranking Tyler to make sure she gets to win the election and become the voice for Young People. Meanwhile, Bailey becomes a dog sitter with the help of Sasha. Sasha wants revenge on Ryan so she and Bailey set the two dogs on Ryan. Carmen's file is stolen when Mike's car is broken into. Carmen reported Mike so he is forced to leave but it is soon revealed Ryan broke in the car to get back at Mike.
| 56 | 9 | "Survivors" | Sarah Walker | Ian Kershaw | 18 March 2016 | 0.35 |
The young people go out for the day but when Harry doesn't want to go, Ryan and Carmen stay behind to look after him. Everyone gets list out in the countryside after the minibus breaks down. When Harry goes missing, Ryan and Carmen panic, setting out to look for him, eventually finding him at Mike's house. Everyone returns home and happily playing a game of rounders.
| 57 | 10 | "The End of It All" | Sarah Walker | Julie Dixon | 25 March 2016 | 0.22 |
On the day of Mike's hearing, 3 replacements are brought in to help out, but May-Li is unimpressed with the kids attitude towards them, with Phoebe, who could not work with the 'level of anger', Mary, who thought she wasn't able to compete with Mike and Kerr, who everyone thought was a bully and so they all leave. Carmen and Tee try to stop the hearing, but Mike doesn't want them too. Instead of giving himself up, Ryan plants Carmen's folder in the office and the kids later find it. They rush to the council and manage to save Mike's job. Mike finds out it was Ryan and they end their feud.
Part 2
| 58 | 11 | "Perfect Match" | Duncan Foster | Dawn Harrison | 30 September 2016 | 0.29 |
The announcement that her mum is pregnant and doesn't want her at home prompts Sasha to decide she wants to be fostered and she is matched to a couple, Lou and Ange, who want to adopt her. Mike wants Ashdene Ridge to be the councils greenest care home and holds an upcycling competition for the young people, who divide into teams. Sasha meets Lou and Ange and is surprised they have dwarfism like her. On a trip to the beach, Sasha realises she isn't ready to give her mum and brothers permanently and she places goods from a souvenir shop in Ange's bag. Later, Lou and Ange help Harry and Ryan out with their go-cart and Sasha thinks Harry would be an ideal match for Lou and Ange. Harry doesn't want to be adopted as he doesn't want to leave Mike, but Harry decides to give Lou and Ange a chance. Sasha's younger sister is born and has dwarfism, like her. Special Guest Appearance: Warwick Davis as Lou
| 59 | 12 | "Doris" | Duncan Foster | Dawn Harrison | 7 October 2016 | 0.27 |
An old woman, Doris, turns up in Carmen's salon unexpectedly. When she leaves, Carmen goes after her and Doris takes Carmen to her house. Meanwhile, Floss wants a kitten as she saw Finn and Ryan videochatting to Harry and Lou and Ang telling Harry that he can have a cat although Lou wants it more so she and Ryan work together to convince Mike they have mice and a kitten would be ideal. Carmen is stunned with Doris' house and dress collection and Doris allows Carmen to try a dress on. Doris is surprised Carmen is in care and Carmen is disgusted to learn Doris' son Felix is moving her out of her home. Floss is disappointed when Mike brings home an adult cat named Nigel and tries to convince Mike and May-Li to get rid of him, but Jody convinces Floss to give him a chance. When Felix visits Doris the next day, Carmen defends Doris and learns Doris is being moved to an old people's home. Doris visits Carmen with Felix and explains she has dementia. This later makes Carmen to decide to become a carer instead of a hair and make-up stylist. Doris is given Nigel the cat after Floss turns out to be allergic to cats. Last Appearance: Phillip-Graham Scott as Harry Jones
| 60 | 13 | "Risky Business" | Duncan Foster | Jessica Lea | 14 October 2016 | 0.37 |
Jody brings home a simulation baby doll from school to take care of for P.S.H.C.E. homework. Bailey decides to enter the Young Entrepreneur of the Year competition with his dog sitting business, and he meets a girl named Hollie and pet dog, Princess. Jody struggles to look after the baby and Floss offers to look after it, but wants to be paid. A new boy, Sammy, arrives at The Dumping Ground for a couple of days. After helping Hollie out, Bailey and Hollie decide to go to London to a marketing workshop and work on a business together involving pets. Sammy meets Carmen and Kazima, who tell him the rules. Bailey tells Hollie he lives in a children's home and he takes a light hearted comment seriously. Jody finds out Floss left the baby in the shed. The following day, Bailey is invited to Hollie's house after collecting references and impresses her father. Back at The Dumping Ground, customers complain that Bailey has stolen money and is arrested, but Hollie confesses. Jody is surprised Ryan has been settling her baby to sleep and Bailey encourages her not to give up. Bailey loses the competition.
| 61 | 14 | "Troll (Note: On screen, the episode was titled "I Troll" for an unknown reason.)" | Duncan Foster | Owen Lloyd-Fox | 21 October 2016 | 0.19 |
Floss begins to feel ignored and Mike tells the young people he has to cancel their adventure trip due to cashflow problems. Floss decides to raise money and meets an art curator, Iona. As the young people are about to play Mo's game, Dungeon Destiny, Floss encourages them to hold their own art show. However, the young people back out when Floss makes an insensitive remark about Johnny. Mike won't allow Floss to hold an art exhibition and as the others play Dungeon Destiny, she and Finn see Iona with Tee's art work and she tells lies about Finn being a victim of bullying. At home, she threatens Finn, witnessed by Sammy and Finn tells the others. Floss decides she wants to be transferred and May-Li figures out Floss wants to be centre of attention. May-Li arranges for Floss to apologise to Finn and she apologises to the others but trouble is when Mike finds out Mo ordered 29 boxes of cereal he likes and Bailey notices the TV wasn’t plugged in and Mike tells him if hat everything up so people could play his game and everyone is annoyed with him.
| 62 | 15 | "It Takes Two" | Duncan Foster | Sarah-Louise Hawkins | 28 October 2016 | 0.20 |
Sammy annoys the other young people by waking them up early to play football and he ruins a t-shirt tyler works on. Ryan gets things ready for Chloe's arrival and warns Tee, Carmen and Sasha not to make a fuss of his sister. Chloe arrives at The Dumping Ground and Ryan settles her in. Tyler becomes annoyed with Sammy, but Tyler shows him some practical jokes. Carmen agrees to hold the pamper party for Chloe and Tyler gets Mo to look after Sammy. Tyler ends up snapping at Sammy. Ryan finds Chloe with the girls when he returns home from shopping and thinks Chloe wants him out of the way. Sammy decides to go through with a dangerous practical joke and gets stuck on the roof and Tyler calms him down whilst the fire brigade come. Sammy is collected by his aunt and Chloe and Ryan make amends. First Appearance: Yousef Naseer as Joseph Stubbs
| 63 | 16 | "Getting To Know You" | Noreen Kershaw | Matt Evans | 4 November 2016 | 0.20 |
Sally tells Tyler, Mike and May-Li that her doctor is pleased with her treatment and she wants Tyler back. Tyler is delighted, but his announcement upsets the others. Mo meets a girl, Kara and falls for her. Jody and Tyler promise to be friends forever and he visits his mum for a meeting with his social worker. Floss agrees to introduce Kara to Mo, but Mo upsets Kara when he spoils her cakes. Tyler and Bailey fight when Bailey is fed up of him showing off. Sally shows Tyler his room, which Tyler does not like as its dinosaur themed. The young people decide to throw Tyler a birthday party and Mo and Kara work together to bake a cake, which ends up burnt when Mo turns the temperature up. Tyler goes between his party at The Dumping Ground and his mum's and Tyler snaps when his mum replaces a photo of the young people with one of them both. Sally and Tyler realise the need to get to know each other and Sally accepts the young people and staff are family too. Mo admits to Kara what he is truly like and the pair kiss.
| 64 | 17 | "Two Camps" | Noreen Kershaw | James Gillam-Smith | 11 November 2016 | 0.21 |
The young people decide to have an Ashdene Ridge festival. Ryan tells Joseph about a prank he pulled and Carmen chooses to go glamping. Whilst putting the tent up, Joseph steals a tent piece, causing the tent to collapse. Tee and Sasha find out Joseph took it and Ryan and Chloe overhear Tee and Sasha talking about Ryan. Ryan admits to Chloe he was told ghost stories by an older child when he was taken into care. Tee and Sasha return the piece for the tent and Chloe tells Tee and Sasha what Ryan said. Tee and Sasha scare Ryan with a ghost story. Ryan finds Chloe's poster, assuming they're Sasha's and he gets Toni to burn them, who's trying to be an individual and Chloe takes the blame for putting it in the fire. Toni and Billie make amends and Chloe realises Ryan was responsible for the poster. Toni and Billie impress Carmen with a glamping corner they did for her. Chloe tries to talk to Ryan, but he refuses to apologise and Chloe wants him to stay away from her.
| 65 | 18 | "How to Be Perfect" | Noreen Kershaw | Nick Leather | 18 November 2016 | 0.35 |
Bailey and Joseph are woken in the night and realise someone has been in Mike's office. May-Li introduces a new boy, Archibald Jeremiah "Archie" Able, to the young people and Mike tells them someone has taken old files. Bailey suspects Tyler and he is forced to admit he has been practising to dance in the garage to impress a girl. Kazima admits to Mike and May-Li she took them as she wants to get adopted in order to stay in the UK instead of waiting. Mike reminds Kazima of the chances of getting adopted at her age and she would most likely get adopted by someone she knows. Joseph places a note in Bailey's room and Kazima pretends to like rollerskating after looking up May-Li online. Mike agrees to teach Tyler dancing, but is interrupted by Finn wanting to change rooms because Joseph pretends to be ill when he has Mischief and when May-Li agrees to think about adopting Kazima. Finn, Billie, Toni and Archie compete with Kazima to be adopted. After looking for Mischief, who escaped from the shed, Joseph finds out Bailey had his bike and Mischief. Kazima decides she doesn't want to be adopted and instead wants to wait. Floss is dropped by Tyler, who she's been teaching to dance and Kazima is given the news she can stay in the UK. First Appearance: Jethro Baliba as Archie Able
| 66 | 19 | "One for Sorrow" | Noreen Kershaw | Ian Kershaw | 25 November 2016 | 0.25 |
Tee and Carmen pack their things whilst the young people imagine life without them. Tee gives Sasha a book with a message from Tracy Beaker and the young people surprise Tee and Carmen with their favourite breakfast. Carmen discovers her picture has been stolen and she admits her worries to Mike. Bailey, Mo, Jody and Joseph decide to figure out who the thief is. Tee is informed by a social worker, Jim, but that a housing policy review after an incident means she and Carmen won't be housed together and Tee can't bring herself to tell Carmen. Floss is suspected of stealing when she takes a photo frame, but she and Finn are working on a replacement photo. Carmen and Tee briefly fall out over their situation, but make up and the young people try to get Jim to do something for Carmen and Tee by occupying the office, but Tee and Carmen persuade them to come out and are delighted Harry returns to say goodbye. Carmen finds her photo returned and both she and Tee are overjoyed when Jim has managed to get them somewhere together. Carmen talks to Jody about what she did and Mike says goodbye to Carmen and Tee. Carmen and Tee are impressed with the car that's been decorated and they give the others a card and a trick sweet before leaving. Guest Appearance: Phillip Graham Scott as Harry Jones Last Appearance: Amy-Leigh Hickman as Carmen Howle and Mia McKenna-Bruce as Tee Taylor
| 67 | 20 | "Two for Joy" | Noreen Kershaw | Ian Kershaw | 2 December 2016 | 0.23 |
Items have been taken from The Dumping Ground and Mike gives the young people until the end of the day for them to be returned. Jody is pleased to see Kingsley at his new flat. Tyler, Mo, Bailey, Archie and Joseph discover Jody hasn't been to the dentist like she said. Billie, Toni, Floss and Finn decide to raise sponsor money to get a donkey named after them. Mo tracks Jody's mobile to find out where she is. Mike introduces Ryan to his independent visitor, Gary. Kingsley reassures Jody that prison helped him. Tyler, Mo and Bailey get lost when they look for Jody. Kingsley introduces Jody to a woman named Rosie and Jody lets them take Mike's carriage clock when she is led to believe Kingsley is in danger. The boys track Jody down and she tells them she is living with Kingsley and despite Kingsley telling her to go back, Jody stays at the flat. Ryan releases a balloon with a note attached that says what Ryan has done and Chloe ends up with the note. Jody is trapped in the flat by a fire caused by a lit candle and Kingsley runs off. Tyler rescues Jody and Mike tells them off for the situation they put themselves in. Jody apologises to the young people for taking their belongings and they forgive her. They are all then introduced to the donkey by Floss, Billie, Toni and Finn, which is named Mike. Final Appearance: Reece Buttery as Mo Michaels

== Production ==
Production began on 24 May 2015, and was completed on 12 November 2015.
