= The Dumping Ground series 7 =

The Dumping Ground
- Series 7
- Series Seven Title Card
- Starring: Connor Byrne; Miles Butler-Hughton; Kia Pegg; Sarah Rayson; Stacy Liu; Lewis Hamilton; Ruben Reuter; Annabelle Davis; Hannah Moncur; Carma Hylton; Connor Lawson; Jasmine Uson; Emily Burnett; Leo James; Cole Welleans-Watts; Josh Sangha; Ava Potter; Anya Cooke
- No. of episodes: 24

Release
- Original network: CBBC; CBBC HD
- Original release: 4 January – 6 December 2019

Series chronology
- ← Previous; Series 6 Next → Series 8

The seventh series of the British children's television series The Dumping Ground began broadcasting on 4 January 2019 on CBBC and ended on 6 December 2019. The series follows the lives of the children living in the fictional children's care home of Ashdene Ridge, nicknamed by them "The Dumping Ground". It consisted of twenty-four, thirty-minute episodes; from episode two onwards, episodes premiered a week early on BBC iPlayer. It is the 15th series in The Story of Tracy Beaker franchise.

== Cast ==
=== Main ===
- Connor Byrne as Mike Milligan / Peadar

Milligan (episodes 22-23 only)

- Miles Butler-Hughton as Tyler Lewis
- Kia Pegg as Jody Jackson
- Sarah Rayson as Floss Guppy
- Stacy Liu as May-Li Wang
- Lewis Hamilton as Ryan Reeves (episodes 1-12 only)
- Ruben Reuter as Finn McLaine
- Annabelle Davis as Sasha Bellman
- Hannah Moncur as Chloe Reeves
- Carma Hylton as Candi-Rose
- Connor Lawson as Alex Walker (episodes 1-23 only)
- Jasmine Uson as Taz De Souza
- Emily Burnett as Charlie Morris (episodes 1-16 only)
- Leo James as Bird Wallis
- Cole Wealleans-Watts as Jay Wallis
- Josh Sangha as Sid Khan
- Ava Potter as Bec Hyde (from episode 18)
- Anya Cooke as Katy White (from episode 23)

=== Guest ===
- Jackie Edwards as Freya
- Matthew Johnson as Luke
- Endy McKay as Jenny Holmes
- Isla McMonigle as Alice Peters
- Dani Arlington as Aileen Peters
- Mike Yeaman as Richard Windsor
- PH Patronus as El Nino
- Lucy Benjamin as Ms Bloomfield
- Georgia Sandle as Piper
- Javone Prince as Lethal G
- Nazerene Williams as Lauren
- William Talbot as Ross Maydons
- Lauren Waine as Fee
- Bailey Hayden as Josh
- Brogan Gilbert as Molly
- Suzette Llewellyn as Melanie
- James MacLaurin as Hayden Mullion
- Neil Grainger as Thom Penryn
- India Fisher as Leera
- Katy Carmichael as Sarah Reeves
- Angela Wityszyn as Maureen Mahoney
- Douglas Rankine as Aaron Staffman
- Christine Walsh as Lara Smith
- Carlos Mapano as Jerome De Souza
- Rosa Coduri as Kris
- Steve Furst as Dr. Jeremy Fielding
- Amelda Brown as Joan Hyde
- Kyanne Carthy as Evie
- Ruby Bruce as Rae
- Francesca Martinez as Amy Hill
- Jack Kane as Blake Miller
- Bethany Asher as Ivy
- Geoff Berrisford as Jake
- Paddy Glynn as Sheila
- Kellie Shirley as Maria White

== Episodes ==
Air dates refer to the episodes' initial airing (i.e. from episodes 2-12, their premiere on BBC iPlayer, which took place a week in advance of their TV broadcast). Ratings are four-screen figures which include pre-transmission viewing.

No. overall	No. in series	Title	Directed by	Written by	Original release date	UK viewers (millions)
Part 1
115	1	"Rage"	David Beauchamp	Gareth Sergeant	4 January 2019	0.28
The young people are woken up to the news by May-Li that some new arrivals will be coming to The Dumping Ground. One of the arrivals, Freya, knows and unsettles Sasha and Mike cancels the young people's individual plans in order for the young people to get to know the new arrivals. May-Li tries to reassure Sasha that Freya understands why she never went to secure accommodation with her. After overhearing the reason why Freya went to secure accommodation, and why Sasha was supposed to go, Ryan exposes Freya's past in secure accommodation and Freya gives a positive explanation; Freya is rescued from the bathroom when she is stuck and shows a note that reads 'leave now', using Sasha's art supplies. Mike will not give Jay his phone back unless he gets to know one of the new boys, Sid, and Jay declares Sid weird when he gives strange responses to his question and when Sasha is shown the note with her being blamed, Jody makes Sasha promise to remain calm. Sasha fails to find proof relating to the note and Freya's clothes are found torn and Sasha is blamed again. Everyone agrees to Freya's idea of a party to bond and prior to the party, Sasha sets it up so that Freya confesses via a Bluetooth speaker that she is looking for revenge against Sasha, but Freya retracts it when the other new boy, Luke, warns her what is happening. Luke also explains to Jay about Sid's strange question responses and Sasha posts a vlog whilst angry, inviting her viewers to Ashdene Ridge for a party and when they turn up, Freya lets them in and encourages vandalism from the guests. Sasha accepts responsibility after owning up about the vlog and after struggling to get the uninvited guests to leave and finding the office trashed, Mike sets off the fire alarm. Afterwards, Freya reveals Sasha not visiting her in secure accommodation was her motivation and when Freya threatens to post images of the young people's files online, Sasha prevents Freya from doing so by going outside and smashing a car window with a brick, taking the blame for all of Freya's actions, declares her hatred for everyone and that she is angry, but May-Li stops her doing further damage with the brick. First Appearance: Josh Sangha as Sid Khan
116	2	"Five Doors"	David Beauchamp	Gareth Sergeant	4 January 2019	0.22
Sasha leaves The Dumping Ground and goes to secure accommodation with Mike and her social worker, Jenny, and despite being excluded from Jenny's report on Sasha, Chloe, Floss, Finn and Alex decide to do a presentation on the true Sasha. All the young people, except Freya, Luke and Sid, receive a text from Jody and Jody shows them a group picture drawn by Sasha and when Sid wets the bed, he is reluctant to tell Mike and May-Li, so Jay pours pop over his bedding to cover it up. Freya insists on accompanying Jody when she goes out, when she plans to see Sasha, and Freya warns Luke to keep an eye on the other young people. Sasha writes and signs her statement and back at The Dumping Ground, Candi-Rose proves Sasha could not have torn Freya's clothing due to the material, they find red paint under the bathroom sink and a vlog of Sasha's, explaining about possibly moving forward with Freya. The young people discover the evidence missing and Luke, under Freya's orders to get rid of the evidence, gives it to the binmen. When Jody gets to secure accommodation, she realises Freya is blackmailing Sasha. Finn and Alex trick Jenny into the garage and when Jody informs the young people of Freya's blackmail, Luke tells them Freya let the people in at the party and broke into the office; Jody confronts Freya and Freya issues her with the choice of keeping quiet for the sake of The Dumping Ground or telling Mike and May-Li, so Jody declares the investigation over. After Jay told him to return to his old care home, Jay and Bird find Sid and the young people realise Freya has their files and at the secure accommodation, Sasha insists on remaining there and as Jenny tells Sasha she will be staying for 6 months, the young people race to the secure accommodation and announce Sasha is innocent. Freya threatens to send the images of the files, but the young people do not mind and Sasha apologises for losing contact with Freya and encourages her to take her second chance. Absent: Jasmine Uson as Taz De Souza
117	3	"The Lone Ranger"	Tracey Larcombe	Mark Stevenson	11 January 2019	0.20
Some of the young people and Mike arrive at a charity auction which included Alex, which aims to provide homes for the homeless, organised by his mother Aileen, and Alex is reunited with Alice. As Aileen speaks of her deprived start in life, Alex's anger grows, especially when Aileen shows affection towards Alice. Taz is unimpressed when she receives just £10 allowance for bowling from May-Li or with the fact she has to take Sid although she doesn't like him. Alex makes a £2,000 bid on a weekend away in Edinburgh and when he wins the auction, Alex says he has no money; Aileen is shocked when she knew who Alex is and that he is living in care. Back at The Dumping Ground, the relation between Alex and Aileen is revealed to Mike. When searching for Tyler's missing money, Floss finds a whoopee cushion that belonged to Frank, so she uses it on the young people just like Frank did. Tyler explains the concept of karma to Taz, so she chooses to be good to be rewarded. Alice visits Alex at The Dumping Ground after being told by Aileen that Alex is her brother and she wants him to meet Aileen, prompting him to accept an earlier visiting request from Aileen. Alex meets Aileen at the park with Mike's supervision and she explains the past, saying she found out from Alex's father about him being in care and Alex shows Aileen the alleyway where he lived. Alex rejects Aileen's plea for forgiveness. Floss fails to prank Ryan with the whoopee cushion, but eventually does with Jody's help and Taz gives up doing what she considers good stuff when she fails to make money, but Tyler tells her that it's wrong to good stuff with selfish motivations. Alex receives e-mails and phone call logs from Mike that show Aileen's contact attempts and Tyler allows Taz to keep his money when she finds it. Alex meets Aileen again to forgive her.
118	4	"Face Your Fear"	David Beauchamp	Suzanne Cowie	18 January 2019	0.21
Floss is learning how to play the trumpet, and is getting on everyone's nerves with her terrible playing. Mike has been getting told about what everyone is getting up to my a secret mole, and the young people are not happy. Jay and Bird have their chocolate confiscated, Alex gets his phone confiscated, and Finn is told he can no longer go to the cinema because he hasn't done his chores. Alex, Finn, Candi-Rose, Bird and Floss are all determined to find out who it is, so they decide to distract Mike in order to break into the office to find the clues. Meanwhile, Charlie and Ryan spend the day at a police horse stable, where they groom and walk the horses. However, Ryan's fear of failure gets the better of him and he quits, getting angry and Charlie and accusing her of wanting all the attention. Charlie soon tells Ryan that she didn't mean what she said to him and she says that she is happy to help him, but he just needs to ask for it, rather than thinking he can do everything, and wanting attention from it. Richard gets annoyed with Ryan when he brings out a horse that is about to be retired, and he walks off again. Charlie convinces him to come back and give it another go, and Ryan is able to walk the horse and everyone is impressed. It is soon learned that Floss was the secret mole the whole time because she wanted trumpet lessons. Everyone hates Floss for snitching on them, but she apologises and makes it up to them. Mike gets off the phone after a phone call from Richard who praises Charlie and Ryan for their hard work and Charlie says that Ryan should be the one who takes on the Saturday job.
119	5	"Run the Risk"	David Beauchamp	John Hickman	25 January 2019	0.21
Mike looks into getting Tyler into a college that specializes in radio production. However, he is faced with his conscience - should he go, or should he not? When arriving at work, Tyler meets Ms. Bloomfield's daughter, Piper. Ms. Bloomfield puts Tyler in charge of showing Piper around and telling her how everything works, however Piper is more interested in causing trouble and messing up the radio station. A local rap artist, Lethal G, is coming to the radio station to do an interview, however when Piper forces Tyler to prank call the station, Lethal G leaves and decides to go to another radio station instead. Realising what they have done, Tyler and Piper decide to try and convince him to come back by pretending to be from the other station. Lethal G agrees and goes with them, however Tyler takes him to Ashdene Ridge instead. At first, Lethal G wants to leave, but is persuaded to stay. Mike isn't happy about it, but sees how happy the young people are and how much trouble Tyler went through. Lethal G reveals his name is actually Graham. Tyler decides to apply for the radio production college.
120	6	"Candi-Rose?"	Tracey Larcombe	Colin Steven	1 February 2019	0.21
Mike forbids the young people from going out to catch up on their homework after reading out unfavorable comments from their school reports, but Candi-Rose sneaks out with Bird with his and Jay's help. Charlie decides to help Taz and Sid with their homework, which is a bug hunt. Candi-Rose takes Bird to a cafe she traced from a photo and reveals to Bird she is looking for a girl. Candi-Rose finds the girl and follows her to her flat, calling the name Lauren; she and Bird are pulled into the flat by Lauren. Candi-Rose and Lauren reveal they are sisters to Bird and Candi-Rose's real name is also revealed to be Courtney. Candi-Rose puts decorations up for Lauren's 18th birthday and Candi-Rose gives Lauren something of hers from their mum as an apology for them being split up, but Lauren insists Candi-Rose is not to blame. They explain to Bird they were separated for their safety and their home was not perfect. After Chloe pays Jay to help with her homework, Jody asks Jay to help with hers and Taz grows annoyed with Charlie with her idea of building their own spider's web, so she and Sid hide from Charlie. Everyone is shocked when Candi-Rose turns up at The Dumping Ground with Lauren and when they learn of her real name and Mike and May-Li remind them both of the reasons for their separation. Chloe is upset about not being told about Lauren by Candi-Rose, but brings up the fact that Lauren has left care, so Candi-Rose returns to Lauren, who is planning to leave, but Candi-Rose explains to Lauren that she is 18 and can be her guardian. Charlie, Taz, and Sid apologize to her and Charlie are asked to help. After discovering Candi-Rose missing, they find Lauren's flat empty and whilst out, Lauren points out the consequences if they run away, which include Lauren not being able to take care of Candi-Rose, being split up and she'd have to continue with the pretence of being Candi-Rose, so she opts to return to The Dumping Ground.
121	7	"The Return of the Freaky Twins"	Tracey Larcombe	Dawn Harrison	8 February 2019	0.25
Ross arrives at The Dumping Ground to stay due to a cat allergy and Floss still resents him for taking her ideas before. Mike challenges the young people to go without their favourite things for a day and whoever does can have a room refurbishment with extra funding May-Li is pitching for and Tyler and Jody offer to look after Henry when May-Li is forced to bring him to work. When Ross claims he was abandoned in a photobooth in a shopping centre, Floss discovers the nail bar she was abandoned in was in the same shopping centre, so suspects she and Ross are twins, so she compares similarities between herself and Ross before excitedly declaring them siblings. Candi-Rose is unable to cope without her make up, so she swaps her computer hours with Chloe's make up, working out is not cheating, so the other young people decide to do so. Ross takes Floss to a wooded area and claims it's where the shopping centre used to be, but he runs off, however Ross locates him with a young woman she believes is her mother. The young woman turns out to be Ross' half-sister, Fee, who explains Ross was never abandoned, but was left for a while by their mother, which resulted in social services being called and Ross being placed in care for a day. Mike is disappointed to learn about the young people's cheating and after Jody and Tyler take Henry to the park, Jody struggles with Tyler's suggestion she'd be a good mother, but Jody declares she does not want to be a mother due to her childhood. When the young people find their stuff taken, Floss discovers Fee took them and demands the stuff back or she'll call the police. Ross returns to his former care home. At the social services department, Floss' file is taken out and note falls out, asking for someone to take care of two children (supposedly Floss and Ross).
122	8	"Snake"	Tracey Larcombe	Kim Millar	15 February 2019	0.18
Chloe rebels with revenge when she is left out on a trip to the cinema by trying to get Bird and Jay separated. Jody tries to enter a boxing league but it doesn't go to plan. Sasha learns to knit and spends all of her time doing it.
123	9	"Three's a Crowd"	Gary Williams	Christine Robertson	22 February 2019	0.20
Sasha sees Josh again but theres one problem - he's got a new girlfriend. So she gets Josh to dump her which eventually leads to them falling out. Meanwhile, mike tries to make the DG extremely eco and gets Tyler and Jay to power the electricity
124	10	"A Mother's Love"	Gary Williams	Kayleigh Llewellyn	1 March 2019	0.26
Charlie's life turns upside down when her mum leaves prison.
125	11	"2 + 2 = 5"	Gary Williams	Keith Brumpton	8 March 2019	0.21
Jay's ego goes into overdrive when he is offered a place at a prestigious school. Candi-Rose falls in love with exotic boy Hayden and a robot called Leera takes control over Ashdene Ridge.
126	12	"There's a Million Ways to Say Goodbye"	Gary Williams	Jeff Povey	15 March 2019	0.22
Ryan must finally come face to face with the demons from his past following the sudden return of his abusive mother. Panicked, Ryan must go to extreme lengths to protect him and Chloe which leads to his sudden departure from the DG. Last Appearance: Lewis Hamilton as Ryan Reeves
Part 2
127	13	"The Boss"	Steve Brett	Joe Williams	27 September 2019	0.21
Jody's comments about Ashdene Ridge leave Mike with no choice but to let her be care worker for the day which makes the young people left shocked meanwhile Chloe gets a new lift and Candi-Rose is annoyed when she has to clean the toilet Jody tells Bird and Jay they need a break from each other Alex is also seeing his mum today Sid loses his aunt’s mirror and Taz and Floss steal the TV and burn pizzas for lunch and Jody makes a rota for the young people which annoys them when she turns the WI-FI off but she reliasis she upsets them all and apologises.
128	14	"The Movie Business"	Steve Brett	John Hickman	4 October 2019	0.16
When the Dumping Ground enter a short story competition which if they win will result in a trip to Hollywood, chaos arrives. With everyone arguing about their different ideas for it, Floss getting in the way and Alex not remembering his lines when he is the main part and Sasha, as the director not managing to keep everything under control, they all learn how hard it is. Meanwhile, Finn thinks about getting fostered to a man going for the mayor of Pottiswood but is he just too busy to look after Finn?
129	15	"Two Hands, Four Hands"	Steve Brett	David Chikwe	11 October 2019	0.24
Tazs Dad comes to visit Taz and Taz is delighted to find out she can go on day visits to see him. But when she overhears Mike and May-Li debating whether she should actually be allowed to, she goes to lengths to make sure that he impresses Mike and May-Li so shell be allowed which leads to her getting told off. Meanwhile, Charlie meets an electrician and eventually, through her, decides she wants to depart from Ashdene Ridge and Alex gets creeped out by Sids dummy.
130	16	"Letting Go"	Steve Brett	Suzanne Cowie	18 October 2019	0.18
It's Charlie's last day at the Dumping Ground and she's all set to go on holiday on the Galapagos islands and then move into her bungalow. But when she and Alex realise they're in love, it threatens to derail her plans, although she does eventually decide to leave anyway. Meanwhile, strange Dr. Fielding comes to the DG to educate happiness but Floss realises he's a fraud and he lied about where he studied. Last Appearance: Emily Burnett as Charlie Morris
131	17	"Tyler Means Business"	Nicole Volavka	Claire Miller	25 October 2019	0.14
Tyler goes high and deep to raise money for a summer holiday. He eventually pretends they're a charity, makes Candi-Rose, Chloe, Finn and Bird make brownies at crazy times in the morning for the charity, makes up sad lies about some of the residents and steals Mike's money for brownie ingredients. Meanwhile, Sasha is surprised to learn that Mike is the model of a picture they were supposed to draw in her art class and Floss and Jay have a games competition in which Jay realizes Floss cheated.
132	18	"Go Fish"	Hildegard Ryan	Julie Dixon	1 November 2019	0.22
New girl Bec arrives at the DG and wastes no time in wreaking havoc. First she tears up her welcome signs and then causes a fire in the garden. Taz and Sid start to believe she's dangerous and take one item from each resident and lock it in the shed so Bec cannot steal it. It is also revealed that Bec has had a hard past time before coming to the DG. First Appearance: Ava Potter as Bec Hyde. Absent: Ruben Reuter as Finn McLaine
133	19	"King Of Comedy"	Nicole Volavka	Kim Millar	8 November 2019	0.13>
When Candi-Rose signs Bird up for a standup comedy event, he reluctantly decides to do it. But when he can't find anything to base it on, he bases it on saying mean things about some of the residents which doesn't go down well. Meanwhile, Tyler and Finn get perfect revenge when Alex puts stink bombs near Finn. Taz and Sid get competitive in a golf competition.
134	20	"Champions"	Nicole Volavka	Gareth Sergeant	15 November 2019	0.18
Finn is all set for going in a swimming race but when he realises he's up against champion/bully Blake who puts Finn off it, he refuses to do it. Meanwhile, Bec refuses to socialise/make friends with anyone and she and Floss soon become enemies and Jody tries to keep a secret from Tyler which leads to their falling out
135	21	"Another Planet"	Nicole Volavka	Rachel Smith	22 November 2019	0.20
Chloe is spending all her time on a video game and is enjoying it. She takes a huge risk by meeting with someone online but luckily it turned out all right. Meanwhile, Mike can not stop taking pictures of his homeade eclair and Sasha's vlog gets hacked by one of the Ashdene Ridge residents wanting revenge on her.
136	22	"Reunion"	Amanda Mealing	Owen Lloyd-Fox	29 November 2019	0.22
Mike is offered to go to reunion at his school in Ireland. He decides to bring Sasha, Tyler and Candi-Rose with him. His world is rocked when the trip brings some long-buried secrets such as he was in care and he has a twin brother in Ireland named Paedar Absent: Jasmine Uson as Taz De Souza, Connor Lawson as Alex Walker, Hannah Moncur as Chloe Reeves, Josh Sangha as Sid Khan, Leo James as Bird Wallis, Ava Potter as Bec Hyde, Sarah Rayson as Floss Guppy and Cole Wealeans-Watts as Jay Wallis Note: Connor Byrne as Mike Milligan also plays his twin brother Paedar in this episode as well as the next episode.
137	23	"Mighty Mike Milligan"	Alex Jacob	Jeff Povey	6 December 2019	0.19
Mike, now with a known family has the toughest day yet with his twin brother calling him all the time, his Mum unwell, new girl Katy going missing immediately, a prom night that he organised coming up and Alex leaving the DG. Meanwhile, Tyler has to reject Jody to go to the prom with Piper from the radio station and Bird invites Candi-Rose to the prom to dance with her when her former crush does too. First Appearance: Anya Cooke as Katy Last Appearance: Connor Lawson as Alex Walker
138	24	"The Last Dance"	Alex Jacob	Jeff Povey	6 December 2019	0.17
It's prom night and a lot of things are happening. Mike has to choose between his life as a care worker or going to Ireland to look after his Mum, Tyler has to choose between Jody and Piper, Finn wants to impress his crush, Ivy, Chloe and the boy she met online are going out but May-Li is getting in the way, Floss finding Ross again and the pair trying to cheat to be the winners of the best people at the prom, Bec meets her former enemy and has to stick up for Floss when her enemy is mean to her, leading to Bec and Floss becoming friends and Candi-Rose and her former crush, Hayden try to go out but Candi-Rose wants to go out with Bird instead. Mike eventually decides to leave the DG immediately to look after his Mum. Last Appearance: Connor Byrne as Mike Milligan Note: No former residents appear properly in this finale but there are a set of audio and visual flashbacks at the end, including archive audio from the first episode of The Story of Tracy Beaker and footage from The Dumping Ground episodes "Perfect Match" and "What Lies Beneath".

== Production and casting ==
A seventh series of The Dumping Ground was confirmed in 2016 and production began in April 2017. Like the previous five series, the front exterior is filmed at Rowlands Gill, Tyne and Wear whilst an old school in Newcastle upon Tyne and buildings of the former Loansdean fire station in Morpeth, Northumberland are also used for interior and exterior sets. Additional filming takes place across the North East, including locations such as Newcastle University. All the main cast from the last episode of the sixth series reprise their roles apart from Yousef Naseer who plays Joseph Stubbs. Hylton's sister, Tink, will be standing in for Hylton and Connor Byrne will also be playing the role of Peadar for an episode. Ava Potter and Anya Cooke joined as Bec Hyde and Katy respectively.

Directors for series 7 include: David Beauchamp (4 episodes), Gary Williams, Tracey Larcombe (4 episodes), Steve Brett, Nicole Volavka, Alex Jacob (2 episodes), Hidegard Ryan (1 episode) and Amanda Mealing; the last of these, who portrays Connie Beauchamp in Casualty, is set to direct the 22nd episode of the series, titled "Reunion".

The series' writers include Keith Brumpton (writing an episode entitled "2+2=5"), new writer David Chikwe, Suzanne Cowie (writing the fourth episode, which is set at a horse-riding school), Julie Dixon, Dawn Harrison, John Hickman (2 episodes), Kayleigh Llewellyn, Owen Lloyd-Fox (writing the twenty-second episode, "Reunion"), Kim Millar, new writer Claire Miller, Jeff Povey, Christine Roberson, Gareth Sargent, Rachel Smith, Mark Stevenson and Joe Williams.
