= The Dumping Ground series 2 =

The Dumping Ground
- Series 2
- Series Two Title Card
- Starring: Connor Byrne; Amy-Leigh Hickman; Philip Graham Scott; Mia McKenna-Bruce; Joe Maw; Jessie Williams; Chris Slater; Daniel Pearson; Miles Butler-Hughton; Kia Pegg; Leanne Dunstan; Sarah Rayson; Reece Buttery; Stacy Liu; Kasey McKellar; Akuc Bol
- No. of episodes: 13

Release
- Original network: CBBC; CBBC HD
- Original release: 10 January – 28 March 2014

Series chronology
- ← Previous; Series 1 Next → Series 3

The second series of the British children's television series The Dumping Ground began broadcasting on 10 January 2014 on CBBC and ended on 28 March 2014. The series follows the lives of the children living in the new fictional children's care home of Ashdene Ridge nicknamed by them "The Dumping Ground". It consists of thirteen, thirty-minute episodes. It is the tenth series in The Story of Tracy Beaker franchise.

== Series synopsis ==
The Dumping Ground returned for a second series in January 2014.

Gina Conway (Kay Purcell) and Elektra Perkins ( Jessica Revell) did not return in this series. Stacy Liu was introduced as May Li Wang in "Jody in Wonderland" and Kasey McKellar joined the cast in "Kick Off" as Bailey Wharton. This is the first series in the Tracy Beaker franchise to feature the care home Ashdene Ridge. Jessie Williams left the series as Lily Kettle in Episode 4, "The Barbecue" after moving down South with Shannay and Steve. This series includes a vast majority of plots including Frank becoming homeless and living on the streets, Faith having to deal with her serious injury after being run over by a car, Johnny debated over signing up as a soldier, plus Tyler receiving a visit from his mum. Floss Guppy's past is revealed and whilst Bailey struggles with dyslexia. Johnny and Tee receive a visit from their mum, and Liam O'Donovan returns to the show in the series finale. This is the last series with Elly Brewer at the helm and posing as lead writer, despite being in the position since 2010.

== Cast ==
=== Main ===
- Connor Byrne as Mike Milligan
- Amy-Leigh Hickman as Carmen Howle
- Philip Graham Scott as Harry Jones
- Mia McKenna-Bruce as Tee Taylor
- Joe Maw as Johnny Taylor
- Jessie Williams as Lily Kettle (episodes 2 and 4 only)
- Christopher John Slater as Frank Matthews
- Daniel Pearson as Rick Barber
- Miles-Butler Hughton as Tyler Lewis
- Kia Pegg as Jody Jackson
- Leanne Dunstan as Faith Davis
- Sarah Rayson as Floss Guppy
- Reece Buttery as Mo Michaels
- Stacy Liu as May Li Wang
- Kasey McKellar as Bailey Wharton
- Akuc Bol as Kazima Tako (episode 5, 12 and 13)

=== Guest ===
- Danny Ashok as Serjay
- Gauri Vedhara as Doctor
- Mark Theodore as Jimmy Wharton
- Finn Armstrong as Daryl
- Jon Regan as Police Officer
- Asif Khan as Police Officer
- Angela Griffin as Sasha
- Dale Meeks as Custody Sergeant
- George Sampson as Danny
- Georgina Campbell as Jen
- Alan Renwick as Shopkeeper
- Diveen Henry as Sally Lewis
- Shareesa Valentine as Community Support Officer
- Darren Morfitt as Mr Jenkins
- Mackenzie Sol Williams as Justin
- Viv Anderson as himself
- Lu Corfield as Nicky Richardson
- Chris Finch as Jack O'Donovan
- Michael Hodgson as Doug Duffy
- Lucy Speed as Nerys Duffy
- John Bowley as Neil
- Alex Humprey as Jesse
- Claire Sundin as Jesse's Mum
- Sally Rogers as Lucy Taylor
- Lucy Briggs as Hope Taylor
- Gabrielle Glaister as Shani da Silva
- Richard Wisker as Liam O'Donovan
- John Sumner as Manager
- Chris William Chris as Chad Wild Clay

=== Casting ===
The castings of Kasey McKellar as Bailey and Stacy Liu as May-Li and Akuc Bol as Kazima were announced in November 2013.

== Episodes ==
No. overall	No. in series	Title	Directed by	Written by	Original release date	UK viewers (millions)
15	1	"Kick Off (Booting Up – Part 1)"	Sallie Aprahamian	Elly Brewer	10 January 2014	0.57
When young Bailey Wharton is found living on his own, he is taken to the Dumping Ground where his arrival has quite an impact on the other residents. First Appearance: Kasey McKellar as Bailey Wharton Absent: Jessie Williams as Lily Kettle
16	2	"Quitters (Booting Up – Part 2)"	Sallie Aprahamian	Dawn Harrison	10 January 2014	0.57
After being run over by a car, Faith's homecoming does not go according to plan. And when Baileys Dad finally turns up will Bailey accept him for leaving him alone?
17	3	"The Dumping Ground Experience"	Sallie Aprahamian	Sarah-Louise Hawkins	17 January 2014	0.32
When a filmmaker called Sasha comes to Ashdene Ridge to make a training film for future careworkers, Jody notices that everybody's behaving like mindless zombies, overcome with fame. She decides to take things into her own hands, and calls on Tyler to help her out. Absent: Chris Slater as Frank Matthews and Jessie Williams as Lily Kettle
18	4	"The Barbecue"	Sallie Aprahamian	Debbie Oates	24 January 2014	0.45
Mike calls a meeting with the DG and Lily breaks the news to Carmen she's leaving to move to south with her dad, Shannay and Jonah and Carmen gets upset kicks and breaks Johnnys window blaming Bailey for this he gets arrested and Floss makes Carmen give her the silver dog and then Floss is in trouble for it and Lily and Carmen make amends and Lily leaves the dumping ground. Last Appearance: Jessie Williams as Lily Kettle Absent: Chris Slater as Frank Matthews
19	5	"Finding Frank"	Nigel Douglas	Emma Reeves	31 January 2014	0.30
Frank has been spending a lot of time out of Ashdene Ridge recently, and when his friends pop round to his new flat for a visit they uncover the shocking truth – Frank is living on the streets after being conned out of his money and getting into debt. He needs help, and the Dumping Ground kids are there to help him even though Mike and May-Li aren't happy. May-Li also asks Kazima about her parents. First Appearance: Akuc Bol as Kazima Tako
20	6	"Holding On"	Nigel Douglas	Matt Evans	7 February 2014	0.30
Expectations are high when Tyler's mum comes to visit; however, she hasn't been on her pills for her bipolar disorder, and so the day doesn't go entirely as planned. Meanwhile, after fifty locusts escape from Mo's care, he decides it's the right time to give away his talentless snake.
21	7	"Endurance"	Nigel Douglas	Sarah-Louise Hawkins	14 February 2014	0.36
A bizarre TV challenge ensues with two opposing teams going head to head to win their chance to watch their favourite TV programme on telly. Its football or talent. However, soon the gang realise that it's harder to keep their hands in the TV than they think. As both teams play dirty, toilet breaks and temptations so get in their way.
22	8	"I Have a Dream"	Diana Patrick	Julie Dixon	21 February 2014	0.34
Faith and Rick are at loggerheads, whilst Bailey and Mo become unlikely allies, teaming up to write the best short story they can. There's only one problem – Bailey's dyslexic. Absent: Conner Byrne as Mike Milligan
23	9	"Sticks and Stones"	Diana Patrick	Mark Burt	28 February 2014	0.38
Bailey's dreams are thrown into jeopardy when his football coach shows his true colours. Meanwhile Floss is upset by Carmens rudeness when she ordered a nail set and May-Li tells Floss about her mum what happened to her when she was a baby after Floss tried to draw a picture of her mum after Carmen Tores it when she thought Floss glued to her to her sheet but it was Jody and Tyler when they told Carmen she needed to stop being so mean. Absent: Phillip Graham Scott as Harry Jones
24	10	"G.I. Johnny"	Diana Patrick	Elly Brewer	7 March 2014	0.47
When Johnny tackles a mugger, he reveals hidden talents. But will he really sign up to join the army, leaving all of his friends behind?
25	11	"Be My Girl"	Diana Patrick	Dawn Harrison	14 March 2014	0.36
Floss meets some prospective parents and Rick and Carmen's friendship might reach breaking point.
26	12	"Hope"	Diana Patrick	Emma Reeves	21 March 2014	0.41
Johnny and Tee have very different reactions when their mum arrives at the Dumping Ground. Johnny doesn't want to see her and Tee does. Kazima Tako, Frank's friends becomes a Resident at The Dumping Ground, but will Carmen be friendly? Absent: Phillip Graham Scott as Harry Jones, Miles Bulter-Hughton as Tyler Lewis, Kia Pegg as Jody Jackson and Sarah Rayson as Floss Guppy Note: Akuc Bol as Kazima Tako becomes a main character
27	13	"Face the Music"	Diana Patrick	Elly Brewer	28 March 2014	0.30
Frank's and Faith’s new job is jeopardised when Frank is reunited with an old friend. Frank tries to fix it bit it is not so easy. Last Appearance: Chris Slater as Frank Matthews, Leanne Dunstan as Faith Davis and Daniel Pearson as Rick Barber Guest Appearance: Richard Wisker as Liam O'Donovan
