= List of The Story of Tracy Beaker (franchise) characters =

Tracy Beaker franchise characters

This is a list of the characters who have appeared in the BAFTA-award-winning franchise of CBBC children's drama series The Story of Tracy Beaker, Tracy Beaker Returns, The Dumping Ground, My Mum Tracy Beaker and The Beaker Girls, which have spanned fourteen years between them. Connor Byrne, who plays Mike Milligan, is the franchise's longest serving cast member, having appeared in twelve series across three of four shows. Dani Harmer has played the lead character Tracy Beaker in The Story of Tracy Beaker, Tracy Beaker Returns, My Mum Tracy Beaker and The Beaker Girls and featured as a guest in the 6th series of The Dumping Ground.

== The Story of Tracy Beaker ==
Character	Actor	Series						
Character	Actor	1	2	3	TV film	4	Parties with Pudsey	5
Introduced in The Story of Tracy Beaker
Tracy Beaker	Dani Harmer	Main	Main	Main	Main	Main	Main	Main
Michael 'Mike' Milligan	Connor Byrne	Main					Featured	Main
Camilla 'Cam' Lawson	Lisa Coleman	Main	Main	Main	Main	Main	Main	Main
Elaine "the Pain" Boyak	Nisha Nayar	Main	Main	Main	Main	Main	Main	Main
Norman 'Duke' Ellington	Clive Rowe	Main	Main	Main	Main	Main	Main	
Jenny Edwards	Sharlene Whyte	Main	Main					
Justine Littlewood	Montanna Thompson	Main	Main	Main	Main	Featured	Featured	Main
Louise Govern	Chelsie Padley	Main	Main	Recurring			Featured	
Adele Azupadi	Rochelle Gadd	Main	Main				Featured	
Ben Batamabuze	Luke Youngblood	Main	Main					
Peter Ingham	Joe Starrs	Main						
Ryan Patterson	Sonny Muslim	Main						
Zac Patterson	Jay Haher	Main						
Maxwell 'Maxy' King	Jerome Holder	Main						
Carly Beaker	Annette Bentley	Recurring						
Carly Beaker	Ruth Gemmell				Main			
Bradley 'Bouncer' Plakova	Ben Hanson		Main	Main	Main	Main	Main	Recurring
Lawrence 'Lol' Plakova	Ciaran Joyce		Main	Main		Main	Main	Main
Dolly	Chloe Hibbert Waters		Main	Main				
Nathan Jones	James Cartwright		Main	Main			Featured	
Amber Hearst	Alicia Hooper		Main				Featured	
Shelley Appleton	Nicola Reynolds			Main	Main			Recurring
Liam 'Crash' Daniels	Darragh Mortell			Main	Main	Main	Main	Main
Hayley Sparks	Kristal Lau			Main	Main	Main	Main	
Layla	Cara Readle			Main	Main	Main	Main	Main
Marco Maloney	Jack Edwards			Main	Main	Main	Main	Main
Michael Grice	George Kizis			Main			Featured	
Jackie Hopper	Abby Rakic-Platt			Main	Main	Main	Main	Main
Sid Rooney	Vincenzo Pellegrino					Main		
Chantal Wellard	Deepal Palmar					Main		Recurring
Rio Wellard	Craig Roberts					Main		Main
Roxy Wellard	Sophie Borja					Main		Main
Sean 'Wolfie'	Felix Drake					Main		Main
Rebecca Chalmers	Georgina Hagen							Main
Milly	Holly Gibbs							Main
Alice	Olive Gray							Main

== Tracy Beaker Returns ==
Character	Actor	Series		
Character	Actor	1	2	3
Introduced in The Story of Tracy Beaker
Tracy Beaker	Dani Harmer	Main	Main	Main
Michael 'Mike' Milligan	Connor Byrne	Main	Main	Main
Camilla 'Cam' Lawson	Lisa Coleman	Recurring	Recurring	Recurring
Justine Littlewood	Montanna Thompson			Guest
Introduced in Tracy Beaker Returns
Gina Conway	Kay Purcell	Main	Main	Main
Carmen Howle	Amy-Leigh Hickman	Main	Main	Main
Tee Taylor	Mia McKenna-Bruce	Main	Main	Main
Johnny Taylor	Joe Maw	Main	Main	Main
Harry Jones	Philip Graham Scott	Main	Main	Main
Frank Matthews	Chris Slater	Main	Main	Main
Gus Carmichael	Noah Marullo	Main	Main	Main
Sapphire Fox	Saffron Coomber	Main	Main	Main
Liam O'Donovan	Richard Wisker	Main	Main	Main
Lily Kettle	Jessie Williams	Main	Main	Main
Poppy Kettle	Katie Anderson	Recurring	Recurring	Recurring
Rosie Kettle	Claudia Colling	Recurring		
Rosie Kettle	Millie Redfearn		Recurring	Recurring
Toby Coleman	John Bell	Main	Main	
Mandy 'Elektra' Perkins	Jessica Revell		Main	Main
Tyler Lewis	Miles Butler-Hughton			Main
Ricardo 'Rick' Barber	Daniel Pearson			Main
Jody Jackson	Kia Pegg			Main

== The Dumping Ground ==
Character	Actor	Series															
Character	Actor	1	Special (2013)	2	3	4	5	Special (2017)	6	7	8	9	10	11	12	13	14
Introduced in The Story of Tracy Beaker
Michael 'Mike' Milligan	Connor Byrne	Main	Main	Main	Main	Main	Main		Main	Main							
Introduced in Tracy Beaker Returns
Gina Conway	Kay Purcell	Main															
Carmen Howle	Amy-Leigh Hickman	Main	Main	Main	Main	Main											
Tee Taylor	Mia McKenna-Bruce	Main	Main	Main	Main	Main	Main	Main	Main	Main	Main	Main	Main	Main	Main	Main	
Johnny Taylor	Joe Maw	Main	Main	Main	Main		Featured										
Harry Jones	Philip Graham Scott	Main	Main	Main	Main	Main											
Frank Matthews	Chris Slater	Main	Main	Main	Guest		Featured		Guest								
Lily Kettle	Jessie Williams	Main	Main	Main					Featured				Guest				
Mandy 'Elektra' Perkins	Jessica Revell	Main					Featured				Guest						
Tyler Lewis	Miles Butler-Hughton	Main	Main	Main	Main	Main	Main	Main	Main	Main	Main	Guest					
Ricardo 'Rick' Barber	Daniel Pearson	Main	Main	Main													
Jody Jackson	Kia Pegg	Main	Main	Main	Main	Main	Main	Main	Main	Main	Main	Main	Featured				
Gus Carmichael	Noah Marullo	Main															
Liam O'Donovan	Richard Wisker			Featured					Guest								
Introduced in The Dumping Ground
Faith Davis	Leanne Dunstan	Main	Main	Main	Guest												
Floss Guppy	Sarah Rayson	Main	Main	Main	Main	Main	Main	Main	Main	Main	Main	Main	Main				
Anthony 'Mo' Michaels	Reece Buttery	Main	Main	Main	Main	Main											
May-Li Wang	Stacy Liu		Main	Main	Main	Main	Main	Main	Main	Main	Main	Main	Main				
Bailey Wharton	Kasey McKellar			Main	Main	Main	Main		Guest								
Kazima Tako	Akuc Bol			Main	Main	Main	Main						Guest				
Ryan Reeves	Lewis Hamilton				Main	Main	Main	Main	Main	Main							
Billie Trent	Gwen Currant				Main	Main	Main		Guest				Guest				
Toni Trent	Nelly Currant				Main	Main	Main		Guest				Guest				
Mischief	Sage				Recurring	Recurring	Recurring										
Finn McLaine	Ruben Reuter				Main	Main	Main		Main	Main	Main	Recurring	Main				
Sasha Bellman	Annabelle Davis				Main	Main	Main	Main	Main	Main	Main	Main					
Dexter Bellman	Alexander Aze				Recurring	Guest	Main	Main	Recurring								
Murphy Bellman	Thomas and Oliver Waldram				Guest												
Murphy Bellman	Fred Montgomery Scott					Guest											
Murphy Bellman	Lenny Rush											Main					
Chloe Reeves	Hannah Moncur					Main	Main		Main	Main	Main	Main					
Joseph Stubbs	Yousef Naseer					Main	Main		Main								
Archibald 'Archie' Able	Jethro Baliba					Main	Main		Main								
Courtney 'Candi-Rose'	Carma Hylton						Main		Main	Main	Main	Main	Main				
Alex Walker	Connor Lawson						Main		Main	Main	Guest		Guest				
Tazmin 'Taz' De Souza	Jasmine Uson						Main		Main	Main	Main	Main	Main				
Charlotte 'Charlie' Morris	Emily Burnett						Main		Main	Main							
Noah 'Bird' Wallis	Leo James								Main	Main	Main	Main	Main				
Jacob 'Jay' Wallis	Cole Wealleans-Watts								Main	Main	Main	Main	Main				
Sid Khan	Josh Sangha									Main	Main	Main	Main				
Rebecca 'Bec' Hyde	Ava Potter									Main	Main	Main					
Katy White	Anya Cooke									Main	Main	Main					
Scott Murray	Louis Payne										Main	Main					
Viv	Chloe Lea										Main						
Ruby Butler	Liv De-Vulgt										Guest	Main					
Max Riley	Jed Jefferson										Main	Main					
Clementine "Clem" Stephens	Halle Cassell											Main	Main				
Kyle Lavan	Freddy Smith											Main	Main				
Doreen Abedayo	Andrea Hall												Main				
Ben	William Wyn Davies												Main				
Sabrina Moxley	Florrie Wilkinson												Main				
Hugo Little	Hugo Nash												Main				
Bonnie Vasiliou	Lara Mehmet												Main				
Fraser Vasiliou	Massimo Cull												Main				
Wes Oldfield	Owen Phillips												Main				
Izzy Musonda	Zanele Nyoni												Main				
Dita Okomo	Kayleen Ngeuma												Main				

== My Mum Tracy Beaker ==
Character	Actor	Series
Character	Actor	Series 1 (2021)
Introduced in The Story of Tracy Beaker
Tracy Beaker	Dani Harmer	Main
Camilla 'Cam' Lawson	Lisa Coleman	Main
Justine Littlewood	Montanna Thompson	Main
Carly Beaker	Ruth Gemmell	Main
Peter Ingham	Jim English	Guest
Introduced in My Mum Tracy Beaker
Jessica 'Jess' Beaker	Emma Maggie Davies	Main
Sean Godfrey	Jordan Duvigneau	Main
Tyrone	Noah Leacock	Main
Miss Mary Oliver	Danielle Henry	Recurring
Rosalie	Christina Tam	Recurring

== The Beaker Girls ==
Character	Actor	Series	
Character	Actor	Series 1 (2021)	Series 2 (2023)
Introduced in The Story of Tracy Beaker
Tracy Beaker	Dani Harmer	Main	Main
Camilla "Cam" Lawson	Lisa Coleman	Recurring	Recurring
Justine Littlewood	Montanna Thompson	Recurring	Recurring
Peter Ingham	Wim Snape	Main	Main
Elaine "the Pain" Boyak	Nisha Nayar		Guest
Michael "Mike" Milligan	Connor Byrne		Guest
Introduced in My Mum Tracy Beaker
Jessica "Jess" Beaker	Emma Maggie Davies	Main	Main
Sean Godfrey	Jordan Duvigneau	Recurring	
Tyrone	Noah Leacock	Main	Main
Miss Mary Oliver	Danielle Henry	Recurring	Recurring
Introduced in The Beaker Girls
Florence "Flo" Garland	Alibe Parsons	Main	Main
Jordan Whitely	Chi-Megan Ennis-McLean	Main	Main
Patience Price	Daisey Hamilton	Main	Main
Mrs Joanne Cook	Emma Handy	Main	Main
Si Rajani-Martin	Simon Lipkin	Recurring	Main
Priya Rajani-Martin	Taj Kandula		Main
Asha Rajani-Martin	Diya Sohi		Main
Ajay Rajani-Martin	Tarun Sivakanesh		Recurring
Seren	Mersey Moore		Recurring
Moses Price	Buddy Skelton		Recurring

== See also ==
- List of The Story of Tracy Beaker characters
- List of Tracy Beaker Returns characters
- List of The Dumping Ground characters
