= The Dumping Ground: I'm... =

British children's television series

- Genre: Children's drama
- Theme music composer: Jeremy Holland-Smith
- Country of origin: United Kingdom
- Original language: English
- No. of series: 3
- No. of episodes: 24

Production
- Producers: Lucy Martin; Annette Williams
- Running time: 15 minutes

Original release
- Network: BBC iPlayer
- Release: 25 January 2016 – 11 June 2021

Related
- The Dumping Ground; Tracy Beaker Returns; The Story of Tracy Beaker

The Dumping Ground: I'm... is a television spin-off of British children television series The Dumping Ground. It was a webisode series that began airing prior to series 4. The series consisted of 10 episodes.

Series 2 of The Dumping Ground, I'm... returned in February 2017, and featured characters, Mike, May-Li, Finn and Toni and Billie, presenting themselves.

Series 3 returned once more in May 2021 in the days leading up to the premiere of Series 9, with updated presentations from Jody, Floss, Sasha, and Finn and new presentations from Candi-Rose, Jay, Bird, Sid, Taz, and Tracy Beaker.

== Cast ==
- Mike Milligan – Connor Byrne (Series 1–2)
- Tyler Lewis – Miles Butler-Hughton (Series 1)
- Jody Jackson – Kia Pegg (Series 1–3)
- Floss Guppy – Sarah Rayson (Series 1–3)
- Mo Michaels – Reece Buttery (Series 1)
- May-Li Wang – Stacy Liu (Series 1–3)
- Bailey Wharton – Kasey McKellar (Series 1)
- Kazima Tako – Akuc Bol (Series 1)
- Ryan Reeves – Lewis G Hamilton (Series 1–2)
- Toni Trent – Nelly Currant (Series 1–2)
- Billie Trent – Gwen Currant (Series 1–2)
- Finn McLaine – Ruben Reuter (Series 1–3)
- Sasha Bellman – Annabelle Davis (Series 1–3)
- Chloe Reeves – Hannah Moncur (Series 2–3)
- Dexter Bellman – Alexander Aze (Series 2)
- Candi-Rose – Carma Hylton (Series 2–3)
- Bird Wallis – Leo James (Series 3)
- Jay Wallis – Cole Wealleans-Watts (Series 3)
- Taz De Souza – Jasmine Uson (Series 3)
- Sid Khan – Josh Sangha (Series 3)

== Episodes ==
=== Series 1 (2016) ===
No.	Title	Directed by	Written by	Original release date
1	"I'm...Floss"	Charles Bates	John Piper	25 January 2016
2	"I'm...Sasha"	Charles Bates	John Piper	26 January 2016
3	"I'm...Mo"	Charles Bates	John Piper	27 January 2016
4	"I'm...Tee"	Charles Bates	John Piper	28 January 2016
5	"I'm...Bailey"	Charles Bates	John Piper	29 January 2016
6	"I'm...Jody"	Charles Bates	John Piper	1 February 2016
7	"I'm...Carmen"	Charles Bates	John Piper	2 February 2016
8	"I'm...Ryan"	Charles Bates	John Piper	3 February 2016
9	"I'm...Kazima"	Charles Bates	John Piper	4 February 2016
10	"I'm...Tyler"	Charles Bates	John Piper	5 February 2016

=== Series 2 (2017) ===
No.	Title	Directed by	Written by	Original release date
1	"I'm...Mike"	Charles Bates	John Piper	6 February 2017
2	"I'm...May-Li"	Charles Bates	John Piper	7 February 2017
3	"We're...Billie and Toni"	Charles Bates	John Piper	8 February 2017
4	"I'm...Finn"	Charles Bates	John Piper	9 February 2017

=== Series 3 (2021) ===
No.	Title	Directed by	Written by	Original release date
1	"I'm...Candi-Rose"	Meneka Das	John Piper	31 May 2021
2	"I'm...Sid"	Meneka Das	John Piper	1 June 2021
3	"I'm...Bird"	Meneka Das	John Piper	2 June 2021
4	"I'm...Taz"	Meneka Das	John Piper	3 June 2021
5	"I'm...Jay"	Meneka Das	John Piper	4 June 2021
6	"I'm...Floss"	Meneka Das	John Piper	7 June 2021
7	"I'm...Sasha"	Meneka Das	John Piper	8 June 2021
8	"I'm...Finn"	Meneka Das	John Piper	9 June 2021
9	"I'm...Jody"	Meneka Das	John Piper	10 June 2021
10	"I'm...Tracy Beaker"	Meneka Das	John Piper	11 June 2021
