= Birkhill, Angus =

Coordinates: 56.492695°N 3.055644°W

Birkhill
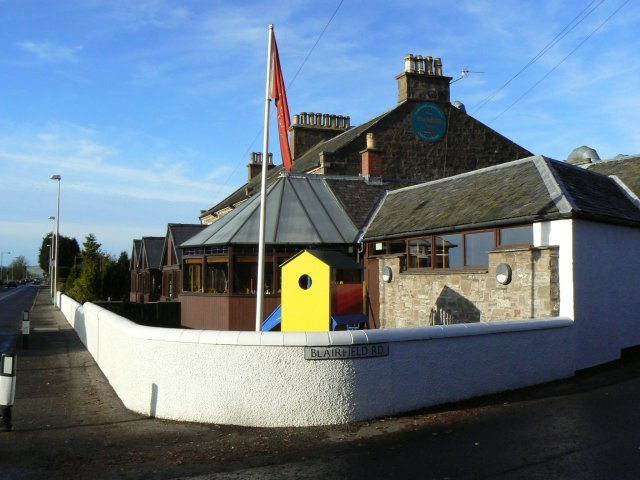
- The Birkhill Inn

- Location within Angus
- Population: 2,010 (2020)
- OS grid reference: NO351339
- Council area: Angus
- Lieutenancy area: Angus
- Country: Scotland
- Sovereign state: United Kingdom
- Post town: DUNDEE
- Postcode district: DD2
- Dialling code: 01382
- Police: Scotland
- Fire: Scottish
- Ambulance: Scottish
- UK Parliament: Dundee West
- Scottish Parliament: Angus North East Scotland

Birkhill and neighbouring Muirhead are two small villages in Angus, just to the west of Dundee, Scotland.

== Community features ==
Features of Muirhead and Birkhill include:

- A branch of Asda Express (one of the first Asda Express shops in the UK)
- A small hill known to locals as The Roundie
- Birkhill Primary School, built in 1993 and later extended (the extension officially opened by Andrew Welsh MSP in 2002). Most students go to Monifieth High School for secondary education, with the school providing buses for the journey to Monifieth. Scottish footballer Craig Brewster attended the older Muirhead Primary School which has now been converted into several houses.
- Sports facilities, including a football pitch, a tennis court and a bowling club
- The Birkhill Inn, a small restaurant and pub often called the "Birkie Inn"
- The Millennium Hall, which hosts clubs and events
- Birkhill is located next to Templeton Woods, home to one of the largest populations of red squirrels in the UK. Comparing the Second Edition Six inch Ordnance Survey Map of Birkhill with the present day illustrates just how much the village has developed in the last century.

== Muirhead ==
In Muirhead there is:

- a convenience store called Adil's
- a chemist
- a doctor's surgery
- a post office
- a Scout Hall, home to the 46th Angus Scouts which is available for rent and is currently well utilised
- a small laundrette.
- a stables and riding school
- two nursery schools, called Birkhill Nursery School and Tiddlywinks Nursery School.
- a large area of woodland known as Backmuir Wood or 5 Mile Wood
- a Motor Mechanics
- a Church
- The Muirhead and Birkhill Millennium Hall which has over 25 different groups using it. Their website can be found at www.muirheadbirkhillmilleniumhall.org.uk

== Sports ==
The Birkhill FC is an Amateur Sunday League Football team that play in the Dundee Sunday Morning Amateur Football Association. They play their home games at Birkie Park.
