= Hannah Moncur =

Scottish actress

- Born: Hannah Linda Moncur-Harper; 22 July 2004 (age 21); Dundee, Scotland
- Education: Monifieth High School
- Occupation: Actress
- Years active: 2012–2025

Hannah Linda Moncur (born Hannah Linda Moncur-Harper, 22 July 2004) is a Scottish actress, best known for her role as Chloe Reeves in The Dumping Ground.

== Early and personal life ==
Moncur was born in 2004 in Dundee to parents Trisha, a nurse, and Paul. At the age of 4 months, Moncur was diagnosed with transverse myelitis and has undergone multiple operations. She has a younger brother, Oliver. Moncur plays basketball and represented Scotland at Lord's Taverners National Junior Wheelchair Championships in 2014. Moncur lives in Birkhill, Angus and attends Monifieth High School. Moncur was a finalist in the Young Scot Awards in 2017.

== Career ==
In 2016, Moncur appeared in an episode of Casualty as Molly Cubie. In March 2015, an open casting call was announced for the character of Chloe in The Dumping Ground. The requirements were for the actress to be a genuine wheelchair user aged between 10 and 14 years old, who could pass for 11 to 13 years old. Moncur found out about the audition from a family friend and had an audition as well as a call back before she was offered the role of Chloe.

== Filmography ==
Television roles
Year	Title	Role	Notes
2016	Casualty	Molly Cubie	1 episode: "Sweet Child of Mine"
2016–2021	The Dumping Ground	Chloe Reeves	Regular role, 101 episodes
2017	The Dumping Ground: I'm...	Chloe Reeves	4 episodes
2020	Thunderbirds Are Go	Bee (voice)	1 episode: "Firebreak"
