= The Lady (TV series) =

British television series

- Genre: Historical drama
- Screenplay by: Debbie O'Malley
- Directed by: Lee Haven Jones
- Starring: Mia McKenna-Bruce; Natalie Dormer; Ed Speleers; Philip Glenister; Claire Skinner; Laura Aikman; Ophelia Lovibond; Mark Stanley
- Composer: Chris Roe
- Country of origin: United Kingdom
- Original language: English
- No. of series: 1
- No. of episodes: 4

Production
- Executive producers: Polly Hill; Stephen Nye; Debbie O'Malley; Sian McWilliams; Andy Harries; Rebecca Hodgson; Jess O'Riordan
- Producer: Florence Haddon-Cave
- Running time: 47 minutes
- Production companies: Left Bank Pictures; Sony Pictures Television

Original release
- Network: ITVX
- Release: 22 February – 2 March 2026

The Lady is a four-part British television drama mini series that is partly fictionalised but based on true events, depicting former royal dresser Jane Andrews who was convicted of murder in 2001. The ITVX series has Mia McKenna-Bruce leading the cast as Andrews, with a cast that also includes Natalie Dormer as Sarah, Duchess of York, as well as featuring Phillip Glenister, Laura Aikman and Claire Skinner.

== Premise ==
The series is a partly fictionalised drama that depicts the true-life story of the rise and fall of former royal dresser Jane Andrews, who rose from humble beginnings to work for Sarah, Duchess of York, prior to being convicted of the murder of her boyfriend Thomas Cressman in 2001.

== Cast ==
- Mia McKenna-Bruce as Jane Andrews
- Natalie Dormer as Sarah, Duchess of York
- Ed Speleers as Thomas Cressman
- Philip Glenister as DCI Douglas
- Claire Skinner as June Andrews
- Daniel Ryan as David Andrews
- Laura Aikman
- Ophelia Lovibond as Aleksandra
- Mark Stanley
- Sean Teale as Luis Castillo

== Production ==
The series was announced by ITVX in December 2024. Lee Haven Jones is director of the four-part series from a script by Debbie O'Malley. Left Bank Pictures are producers on the series. Jess O'Riordan and Stephen Nye are executive produce on behalf of BritBox with Polly Hill for ITV. O'Malley is also an executive producer, while executive producers for Left Bank Pictures are Sian McWilliams, Andy Harries and Rebecca Hodgson. Florence Haddon-Cave is the series producer.

In March 2025, Mia McKenna-Bruce was announced to be leading the series as Jane Andrews, with Natalie Dormer as Sarah, Duchess of York, as well as Ed Speleers, Philip Glenister and Claire Skinner in addition to Laura Aikman, Ophelia Lovibond, Mark Stanley, Daniel Ryan and Sean Teale making up the rest of the cast.

Filming took place in Hampstead, London, in April 2025.

In September 2025, it was reported that Natalie Dormer who plays Sarah, Duchess of York, would not promote the show because of renewed focus on Sarah's ties to convicted sex offender Jeffrey Epstein.

== Reception ==
In September 2026, Lee Haven Jones received a best director nomination at the BAFTA Cymru Awards.
