= Jane Andrews =

English murderer and former royal dresser (born 1967)

- Born: 1967 (age 58–59); Cleethorpes, Lincolnshire, England
- Occupation: Royal dresser
- Employer: Sarah, Duchess of York (1988–1997)
- Known for: Murder of Tom Cressman
- Criminal charge: Murder
- Criminal penalty: Life in prison
- Criminal status: On licence
- Spouse: Christopher Dunn-Butler (m. 1990; div. 1995)
- Partner: Tom Cressman (1998–2000, his death)

Jane Dawn Elizabeth Andrews (born 1967) was a royal dresser for Sarah, Duchess of York. Andrews was imprisoned in 2001 for murdering her lover, and released from prison in 2019.

== Early life and education ==
Jane Dawn Elizabeth Andrews was born in 1967 in Cleethorpes, Lincolnshire. Her father worked as a joiner and her mother was a social worker. As a child, Andrews was promising and intelligent, excelling in grammar school. However, because of the family's debt, they moved to a small townhouse in the nearby seaport town of Grimsby, where she attended Hereford Secondary School.

Throughout her teenage years, Andrews struggled with various psychological problems including depression, panic attacks and an eating disorder. At the age of 15, she attempted suicide by overdose after her mother discovered her truancy. Two years later, she became pregnant and had an abortion, which she later stated was a traumatising experience.

Andrews enrolled in a fashion course at the Grimsby College of Art, and afterward took a job designing children's clothes at Marks & Spencer. At age 21, she answered an anonymous advertisement for a personal dresser in The Lady magazine. Six months later, she was interviewed by the duchess and, four days after that, Andrews began working for Ferguson at Buckingham Palace. With a salary of £18,000 (equivalent to £50,100 in 2025), she lived a relatively opulent lifestyle and was able to purchase a new flat in Battersea Park. Her job brought Andrews a higher status and a new circle of friends, and she was reportedly involved with several men whom she met through her work.

== Marriage and other relationships ==
In August 1990, after a short courtship, Andrews married Christopher Dunn-Butler, an IBM executive. The couple were divorced five years later. Andrews claimed that "pressures of work" led to the couple's split, although Dunn-Butler said that she was repeatedly unfaithful. Andrews did admit to infidelity, saying, "I had a couple of flings. I'm not proud of it."

Following her divorce, Andrews met Dimitri Horne, the stepson of a Greek shipping magnate. When the two broke up acrimoniously, Andrews trashed the flat they shared and fell into a deep depression. She attempted suicide again by overdosing on drugs but survived without seeking medical treatment.

During that time, it is alleged that Ferguson was having an affair with Tuscan aristocrat Count Gaddo della Gherardesca, who supposedly also had feelings for Andrews. Andrews was also sleeping with Allan Starkie, one of Ferguson's former lovers. Shortly after the alleged flings, Andrews was dismissed from her job as Ferguson's dresser. Some believe that issue led directly to Andrews's termination, but officials at Buckingham Palace said that her dismissal was a result of cost-cutting.

== New marriage prospect ==
In 1998, a mutual acquaintance introduced Andrews to Thomas Ashley Cressman (22 October 1960 – 18 September 2000), a former stockbroker. Cressman ran a successful business selling car accessories and mixed in the upper echelons of London society. Because of her supposed financial hardships at the time, Andrews moved into Cressman's flat in Fulham shortly into their relationship. She gained employment at Claridge's Hotel in October 1999 as a PR manager but was required to leave after only two months. For the next two years in the couple's relationship, Andrews made it obvious that she had pinned all her hopes on Cressman as her future husband and father of her children.

== Murder ==
In September 2000, Andrews accompanied Cressman on a holiday to Italy and also to his family's villa on the French Riviera. She was reportedly expecting Cressman to propose marriage to her during their holiday, but instead, he told her that he had no intention of marrying her. After returning to the couple's Fulham flat on 17 September, they began to argue heatedly. Later that night, while Cressman was sleeping, Andrews hit him with a cricket bat and then stabbed him with a knife.

Following the attack, Andrews fled the scene. She contacted her ex-husband Christopher Dunn-Butler shortly after killing Cressman, then sent out text messages to friends inquiring about her lover's whereabouts and well-being. She claimed to have no involvement in Cressman's death and stated that she was being blackmailed. Andrews was untraceable for days until police in Cornwall found her overdosed in her car.

== Trial and imprisonment ==
On 23 April 2001, Andrews went to trial at the Old Bailey. Prosecutors stated that the motive for the killing was a woman scorned. Andrews testified in her defence that Cressman had been abusive during their relationship, citing his alleged sexual obsessions and an incident two years earlier in which she had broken her arm while dancing, stating that Cressman had pushed her. She also claimed that she had suffered abuse during childhood which led her to kill. After twelve hours of jury deliberation, she was convicted of murder and sentenced to life in prison.

In 2001, the psychiatrist Trevor Turner diagnosed Andrews with borderline personality disorder and subsequently said in an ITV documentary that she had been subject to coercive control by the deceased. Andrews started her sentence at HM Prison Bullwood Hall in Hockley, Essex. In November 2009, after having served nine years of her sentence, she absconded from East Sutton Park Prison in Kent. After three days, she was discovered in a hotel room with her family six miles from the prison and taken back to prison.

== Release ==
Andrews had been considered for early release several times but was repeatedly adjudged to be a danger to the public. On 19 June 2015, she was released on licence, with a view to making the transition from prison to mainstream society in a probation hostel.

In 2018, she was accused of harassing a former lover; her licence was revoked, and she was recalled to prison. A police investigation found no evidence of the alleged harassment, and Andrews was re-released from prison on 8 August 2019, initially on the condition that she reside in a designated probation hostel.

== Popular culture ==
The Lady, a partially fictionalised drama on the life of Andrews, was produced by ITVX, and starred Mia McKenna-Bruce as Andrews, with Natalie Dormer as the Duchess of York. The four-part miniseries was first streamed on 22 February 2026.

== See also ==
- Maria Pearson
