= Kay Purcell =

English actress (1963–2020)

- Purcell as Gina Conway in Tracy Beaker Returns
- Born: 6 December 1963; Leyland, Lancashire, England
- Died: 23 December 2020 (aged 57); Lancashire, England
- Occupation: Actress
- Years active: 1993–2020
- Television: Emmerdale; Waterloo Road; Tracy Beaker Returns; The Dumping Ground; So Awkward
- Children: 3

Kay Purcell (6 December 1963 – 23 December 2020) was an English actress. She was best known for portraying the roles of Cynthia Daggert in the ITV soap opera Emmerdale (2001–2002), Candice Smilie in the BBC school-based drama series Waterloo Road (2007–2009), and Gina Conway in the CBBC drama series Tracy Beaker Returns (2010–2012) and its spin-off series The Dumping Ground (2013). From 2015 to 2017, she appeared as Mrs. Rennison in the CBBC sitcom So Awkward.

== Career ==
Purcell's first acting role was as a TV reporter in the TV series Cracker in 1995. She then later starred in Coronation Street as Rhona Summers for 3 episodes in 1997. She appeared as Jenny in the TV series City Central. In 1998 and 2000, she starred in the BBC One series Casualty. In 1998 she played WDC McCarthy, and in 2000 played Diane Abley. Later in 2000, she starred in the TV series Children's Ward as Winsome. Her first major role was as Cynthia Daggert in ITV's Emmerdale. She starred in 188 episodes from 2001 to 2002. Her next major role was in Bernard's Watch from 2004 to 2005, as Ms. Savage for 21 episodes. Purcell played a supporting role in BBC's Waterloo Road as Bolton Smilie's mum Candice Smilie from 2007 to 2009. She played the role of Gina Conway in Tracy Beaker Returns for three series, as well as the first series of the spin-off series The Dumping Ground.

== Illness and death ==
In early 2017, Purcell was diagnosed with breast cancer. Purcell posted images, videos and blogs on social media to show her own experience of the disease. In early 2020, Purcell was diagnosed with terminal liver cancer and was given a life expectancy of two years. She died from metastatic breast cancer, which had spread to her liver, on 23 December 2020, aged 57.

== Filmography ==
Year	Title	Role	Notes
1995	Cracker	TV Reporter	Episode: "True Romance: Part 2"
1996–1998	Emmerdale	Carmel Morgan	Recurring role; 9 episodes
1997	Coronation Street	Rhona Summers	3 episodes
1998	Casualty	WDC McCarthy	Episode: "Taking Sides"
1999	City Central	Jenny	Episode: "Paradise Lost"
1999	My Parents Are Aliens	Mrs. Williams	Episode: "The Home Team"
2000	Casualty	Diane Abley	Episode: "Fall Out"
2000	Children's Ward	Winsome	Series 12: Episode 8
2001–2002	Emmerdale	Cynthia Daggert	Regular role; 188 episodes
2003	Holby City	Heather Nixon	Episode: "Read My Lips"
2004–2005	Bernard's Watch	Ms. Savage	Main role; 21 episodes
2004	Sex Lives of the Potato Men	Gloria	Film
2005	Messiah	Prof Uhomi	Episodes: "The Harrowing: Parts 1–3"
2005	Doctors	Mrs. Jane Manners	2 episodes
2006	Ideal	Alice	Episode: "The Delivery"
2006	My Parents Are Aliens	Mrs. Brookman	3 episodes
2007–2009	Waterloo Road	Candice Smilie	Main role; 24 episodes
2010–2012	Tracy Beaker Returns	Gina Conway	All 39 episodes
2011–2012	Tracy Beaker Survival Files	Gina Conway	Main role
2012	Hacker Time	Herself	Episode: "Connor Byrne and Kay Purcell"
2013	The Dumping Ground	Gina Conway	Main role; 13 episodes
2014–2016	Hacker Time	Mrs. Breadbin	13 episodes
2015–2017	So Awkward	Mrs. Rennison	Main role; 25 episodes
2016	Sunny D	Barbara	Episode: "D Is for Declarations"
2020	When It Rains	Sonia	5 episodes
2021	Doctors	Mo Larkin	Episode: "Of Mice and Women"; posthumous release

== Theatre ==
- The Winter's Tale (1993, as Paulina, Dorcas)
- Everybody Knows All Birds Have Wings (1997)
- Hormonal Housewives (2012)
- Rapunzel (2013, as Gothel the Enchantress)
- Sleeping Beauty (2014, as Carabosse)
