= Monifieth High School =

Location
- Panmurefield Road; Monifieth, Dundee, DD5 4QT; Scotland; 56.4788°N 02.8400°W

Information
- Type: State-funded Secondary School
- Motto: Fais ce que dois (Do what you must)
- Established: 1976
- Authority: Angus Council
- Head teacher: Clair Thomson
- Teaching staff: 100 (approx)
- Gender: Mixed
- Age: 11 to 18
- Enrollment: 1057
- Houses: Balmossie , Dalhousie , Panmure
- Colour
- Publication: Monifieth High School Bulletin
- Feeder schools: Grange Primary School, Seaview Primary School, Mattocks Primary School, Murroes Primary School, Birkhill Primary School, Liff Primary School
- Website: http://www.monifiethhighschool.com

Monifieth High School is a comprehensive state secondary school in Monifieth, Angus, Scotland. The school was founded in 1976 and was originally opened by Lord Thomson of Monifieth. In August 2025 it relocated to the new £66.5 million Monifieth Learning Campus, a Passivhaus-designed replacement building with capacity for around 1,200 pupils. The school serves a catchment area including Monifieth, parts of Barnhill, Birkhill, and rural areas of Angus such as the Hillbanks area, Liff and Auchterhouse.

== School performance ==
Monifieth High School consistently attains exam results well above the national average. In recent years the school’s academic performance has strengthened further, making it one of the top performing schools in the Tayside area. For example, in 2019 61.8% of Monifieth’s S4 pupils achieved at least five awards at SCQF Level 5 (National 5) by the end of that year. By the time pupils finished Sixth Year (S6), 47.5% of the cohort had gained five or more awards at SCQF Level 6 (Higher) and 26.6% had achieved at least one award at Level 7 (Advanced Higher). This was a marked improvement from mid-2010s levels and well above average attainment.

In 2021, nearly half of Monifieth’s school-leavers (approximately 48.5%) left with five or more Higher passes at grades A–C. This was the highest rate in Angus, and placed Monifieth High among the top 10% of Scottish state schools for Higher exam attainment that year. The school’s performance in national examinations has regularly been ranked first in Angus and within the top tier of Scotland’s secondary schools reflecting Monifieth High’s strong academic outcomes.

As of 2025, the school was last inspected by Education Scotland in 2015, when inspectors found that "Young people learn and achieve well at Monifieth High School ... [although] the pace of learning could be brisker, activities more challenging and young people could be given more responsibility for their learning".

== Facilities ==
In 2004, the school renovated many of its facilities, including the reception area, and constructed new changing rooms, increased singing rooms in the music department, and installed many interactive whiteboards in classrooms.

In 2010 pupils vandalised school buildings.

As of 2020, the school is over-subscribed and the school buildings are reported to be "struggling to cope".

== Monifieth Learning Campus ==
Monifieth Learning Campus is Angus Council’s new Passivhaus-designed replacement for Monifieth High School, funded under the Scottish Government’s Learning Estate Investment Programme (LEIP2) after the council secured support in 2020. Construction officially started on 28 June 2023 on the existing grounds (with classes continuing in the old building and was delivered by Robertson Construction Tayside through Procurement Hub’s Major Projects Framework 2. The £66.5 million campus—designed by NORR. with capacity for around 1,200 young people opened to pupils on Thursday 21 August 2025 it is conceived as a year-round community asset with facilities available by let.

The building follows a fabric-first Passivhaus approach (e.g., triple glazing, high insulation/airtightness, MVHR, PVs and air-source heat pumps) targeting ~67–83 kWh/m²/yr and includes flexible teaching spaces, early learning/childcare provision, theatre/performance areas, a gym and studios, and a separately zoned 25-metre swimming pool alongside extensive outdoor sports amenities.

With Phase 1 (the new build) complete and students occupying the campus, Phase 2 comprises decommissioning and demolition of the former school and completion of external works—including a bus drop-off, main pedestrian route, synthetic and grass pitches, and landscaping—scheduled to take roughly twelve months to finish, taking the overall programme to summer 2026.

== Community support ==
In 2020, the school was one of eight local schools making and supplying masks to health workers.

== Previous Rectors & Headteachers ==
- Clair Thomson (2024 - Present) - Headteacher
- Andy Dingwall (2021 - 2024) - Headteacher
- M-C McInally (2013 - 2021) - Headteacher
- Richard Coton (2000 - 2013) - Rector
- Jim Collins (1994 - 2000) - Rector
- Hector Low (1976 - 1994) - Rector

== Notable staff ==
Rhona Goss won the "Teachers of Physics" award in 2005 from the Institute of Physics.

== Notable former pupils ==
- Tom Simpson – keyboard player for Snow Patrol
- Paul Dixon – former Dundee United and Scotland player
