= Alexander Aze =

British actor (born 2003)

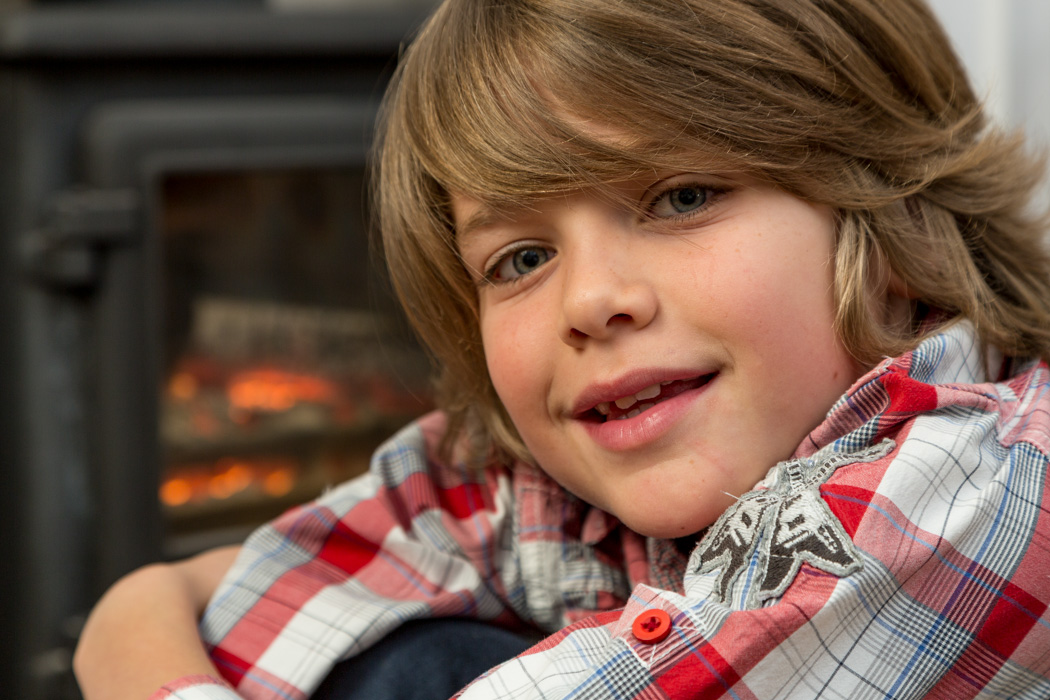
- Born: Alexander Aze; 25 September 2003 (age 22); High Wycombe, Buckinghamshire, England
- Occupations: Student, Actor
- Years active: 2011–present

Alexander "Alex" Aze (born 25 September 2003) is a British actor. He is best known for his portrayal of Luke in the ITV drama Lightfields, in which role The Daily Telegraph described him as a 'promising young talent'.

== Personal life ==
Alex lives in High Wycombe, England. He has previously trained at the Jackie Palmer Stage School in High Wycombe. Alexander used to study at The Royal Grammar School, High Wycombe but currently attends university.

== Television ==
=== Lightfields, ITV 2013 ===
Alex played Luke in ITV's supernatural drama Lightfields, shown in the UK in February–March 2013. Luke, grandson to Barry (Danny Webb) and Lorna (Sophie Thompson), sees the ghost of a girl who died in mysterious circumstances many years before.

=== Father Figure, BBC 2013 ===
Alex played Drew Whyte in the BBC comedy 'Father Figure', shown in the UK in the autumn season 2013. Alexander's character is the younger son of the title figure, Tom Whyte, played by Jason Byrne. In a BBC interview with the cast, Byrne, who also wrote the script for the series, described Alexander as a "great little actor."

=== The Dumping Ground, BBC 2015–2018 ===
Alex played Dexter, Sasha's brother, for two episodes, in Series 3 of the CBBC show The Dumping Ground. He also made a guest appearance in episode 7 Submarine of Series 4. He is currently starring as a main character for Series 5, having been absent only one episode out of seven episodes. He made a guest appearance in the first & fifth episode of Series 6.

== Stage ==
Alex appeared at the Old Vic Theatre in the 2012 production of The Duchess of Malfi starring Eve Best and Harry Lloyd.
