= Mia McKenna-Bruce =

English actress (born 1997)

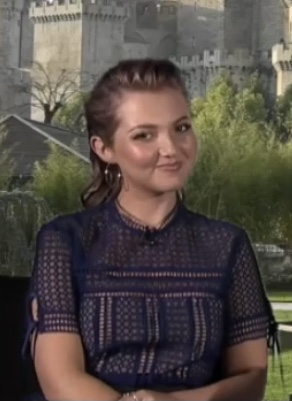
- McKenna-Bruce in 2022
- Born: Mia Sasha McKenna-Bruce; 3 July 1997 (age 29); London, England
- Occupation: Actress
- Years active: 2006–present
- Spouse: Tom Leach (m. 2024)
- Children: 1

Mia Sasha McKenna-Bruce (born 3 July 1997) is an English actress. As a teenager, she played Tee Taylor in the Tracy Beaker franchise (2010–2018). For her performance in the film How to Have Sex (2023), she won a British Independent Film Award, the BAFTA Rising Star Award and was nominated for the European Film Award for Best Actress. Her other films include Persuasion (2022) and The Fence (2025).

On television, McKenna-Bruce also appeared in the iPlayer series Get Even (2020) and the Peacock series Vampire Academy (2022), and she starred in the Netflix series Agatha Christie's Seven Dials (2026) as Lady Eileen "Bundle" Brent.

== Early life ==
McKenna-Bruce was born in 1997 and was raised in Chislehurst, Bromley. She took dance classes at Liz Burville Performing Arts Centre in Bexley and was a student at Belcanto London Academy. McKenna-Bruce also attended the Sapphire Dance Academy in Bexleyheath, as well as the Maidstone Grammar School for Girls.

== Career ==
McKenna-Bruce's first role was a ballet girl in the West End production of Billy Elliot the Musical. Her first TV role was the minor role of Ester, Small Dark Places. She then starred in Holby City as Abi Taylor for one episode. McKenna-Bruce then appeared in EastEnders as Penny Branning. She had a two-episode guest stint in January 2008 and then a three-episode guest stint in April 2008. McKenna-Bruce next starred in The Bill in 2009 as Keira Curtis for one episode. She then moved on to Doctors for three episodes.

Later in 2009, McKenna-Bruce starred in her first film role, The Fourth Kind, playing Ashley Tyler. Her next role was as main character Tee Taylor in Tracy Beaker Returns from 2010 to 2012. In 2011, McKenna-Bruce appeared in the TV series Spy for one episode, and in five episodes of The Tracy Beaker Survival Guide. McKenna-Bruce reprised the role of Tee Taylor from 2013 until 2016 (and again as a guest in 2017 and 2018) in the spin-off series The Dumping Ground. McKenna-Bruce played Tee Taylor in a The Dumping Ground spin-off, The Dumping Ground: I'm..., a webisode series. She guest starred in another episode of Holby City as Asia Lucas, as well as guest starring in BBC Three's Josh. McKenna-Bruce was cast as the lead in a feature film, The Rebels. In 2020, she began portraying the role of Bree Deringer on the iPlayer teen thriller series Get Even. In 2021, she appeared in an episode of Vera, later being cast in the Netflix film Persuasion. In August of that same year, she was cast as Mia Karp in the PeacockTV fantasy series Vampire Academy.

In 2021, McKenna-Bruce successfully auditioned for the role of Tara in Molly Manning Walker's film How to Have Sex. Her performance as an inexperienced schoolgirl grappling with issues of consent while on holiday in Crete was widely praised and led to her being identified as a Screen Star of Tomorrow by Screen Daily. She was also nominated for Best European Actress at the 2023 European Film Awards, and won Best Breakthrough Performer of the Year at the 2023 London Film Critics Circle Awards. She also won the BAFTA Rising Star Award at the 77th British Academy Film Awards.

McKenna-Bruce stars in the Netflix series The Seven Dials Mystery in the role of Lady Eileen "Bundle" Brent. In 2025, it was announced that she would be playing Maureen Starkey in the upcoming series of Beatles biographical films, set for release in 2028.

== Personal life ==
In 2024, McKenna-Bruce married actor Tom Leach. Their son was born in August 2023.

== Filmography ==
Key
†	Denotes films that have not yet been released

=== Film ===
Year	Title	Role	Notes	Ref(s)
2009	The Fourth Kind	Ashley Tyler		
2017	Milo	Mia	Short film	
2019	Hit It and Quit It	Nikki	Short film	
2019	Watch What I Do	Nikki	Short film	
2021	Smudged Smile	Zoe	Short film	
2021	Last Train to Christmas	Linda		
2022	Persuasion	Mary Musgrove		
2023	Kindling	Lily		
2023	How to Have Sex	Tara		
2024	Sister Wives	Galilee	Short film	
2024	Does That Make Me a Woman?	Performer	Short film	
2025	The Fence	Leonier		
2027	Everybody Wants to Fuck Me †	TBA	Post-production	
2028	The Beatles – A Four-Film Cinematic Event †	Maureen Starkey	Filming	

=== Television ===
Year	Title	Role	Notes	Ref(s)
2008	Small Dark Places	Ester	1 episode	
2008	Holby City	Abi Taylor	Episode: "Physician, Heal Thyself"	
2008	EastEnders	Penny Branning	5 episodes	
2009	The Bill	Keira Curtis	Episode: "Little Girl Lost: Part 1"	
2009	Doctors	Pearl Snow	3 episodes	
2010–2012	Tracy Beaker Returns	Tee Taylor	Main role	
2011	Spy	Ashley	Episode: "Codename: Blood"	
2011	The Tracy Beaker Survival Files	Tee Taylor	5 episodes	
2013–2018	The Dumping Ground	Tee Taylor	Main role	
2014	The Dumping Ground Survival Files	Tee Taylor	Main role	
2016	The Dumping Ground: I'm...	Tee Taylor	Main role	
2017	Holby City	Asia Lucas	Episode: "Growing Pains"	
2017	Josh	Babysitter	Episode: "Bicycles & Babies"	
2019	Piss Off, I Love You	Teen Snogger	1 episode	
2019	Cleaning Up	Emily	1 episode	
2019	The Rebels	Enica	Main role	
2019	The Witcher	Marilka	Episode: "The End's Beginning"	
2020	Get Even	Bree Deringer	Main role	
2021	Vera	Maya Draper	1 episode	
2022	Vampire Academy	Mia Karp	Main role	
2026	Agatha Christie's Seven Dials	Lady Eileen "Bundle" Brent	Main role	
2026	The Lady	Jane Andrews	Main cast, 4 episodes	

=== Video games ===
Year	Title	Role
2011	Tracy Beaker Returns: You Choose	Tee Taylor
2013–2014	The Dumping Ground Game	Tee Taylor
2015	The Dumping Ground: You're the Boss	Tee Taylor

== Awards and nominations ==
Year	Award	Category	Nominated work	Result	Ref.
2023	British Independent Film Awards	Best Lead Performance	How to Have Sex	Won	
2023	British Independent Film Awards	Breakthrough Performance	How to Have Sex	Nominated	
2023	European Film Awards	European Actress	How to Have Sex	Nominated	
2024	London Film Critics' Circle	Breakthrough Performer of the Year	How to Have Sex	Won	
2024	British Academy Film Awards	BAFTA Rising Star Award	How to Have Sex	Won	
