= Ruben Reuter =

English actor

- Born: 28 June 2000 (age 26); Huddersfield, West Yorkshire, England
- Education: Royds Hall School
- Occupation: Actor
- Years active: 2013–present

Ruben Reuter (born 28 June 2000) is an English actor and journalist, best known for his role as Finn McLaine in The Dumping Ground.

== Early and personal life ==
Reuter was born in Huddersfield to parents Kim Reuter and Russ Elias. He has Down syndrome and attended Royds Hall School. He is trained by his parents' theatre group, Shabang!.

== Career ==
Reuter appeared in an episode of My Life in 2013. Reuter joined The Dumping Ground in 2015 as Finn McLaine. Reuter reprised the role of Finn McLaine in a The Dumping Ground spin-off, The Dumping Ground: I'm..., a webisode series. In 2025 Reuter played Perceval in Lord of The Flies at Chichester Festival Theatre

He also works as a reporter and disability correspondent for Channel 4 News.

Reuter and actress Ruth Madeley, who has spina bifida, appeared in a documentary from Channel 4 on disability and abortion titled Disability and Abortion: The Hardest Choice. The documentary aired in August 2022.

== Filmography ==
Year	Title	Role	Notes
2013, 2018	My Life	Himself	2 episodes
2015–2021, 2023-2024	The Dumping Ground	Finn McLaine	Regular role
2016–2017	The Dumping Ground: I'm...	Finn McLaine	Regular role
2021	The Syndicate	Shane Sanderson	Series 4 episode
2022	Disability and Abortion: The Hardest Choice	Himself	Television Documentary
2023	Mobility	Dan	TV Comedy Short, won BAFTA in 2024
2025	Pushers	Harry Clarke	Regular role

Video games
Year	Title	Role
2015	The Dumping Ground: You're the Boss	Finn McLaine

== See also ==
- List of people with Down syndrome
