= Kia Pegg =

English actress and presenter

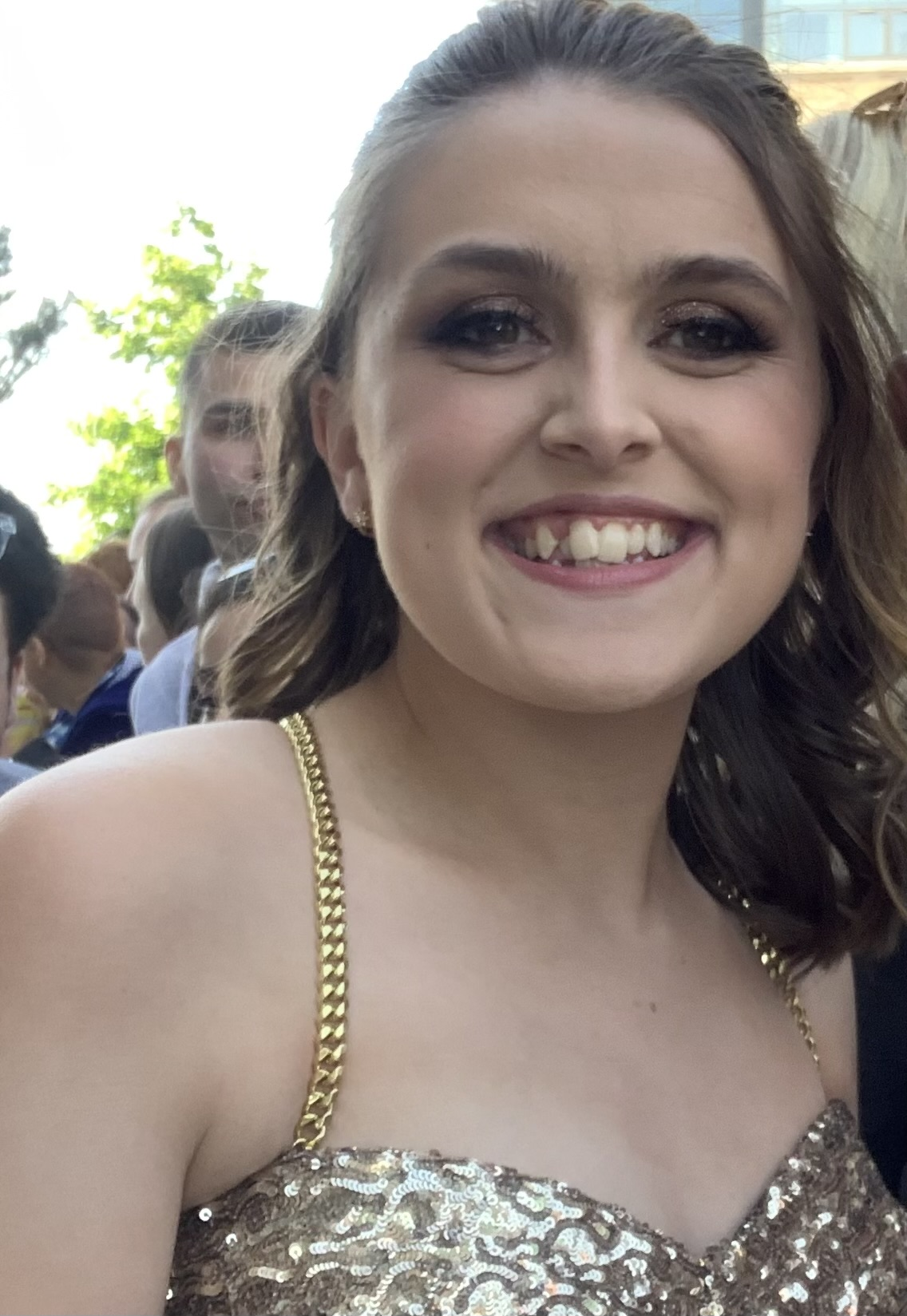
- Pegg in 2023
- Born: Kia May Pegg; 29 June 2000 (age 26); Birmingham, West Midlands, England
- Occupations: Actress; television presenter
- Years active: 2010–present
- Television: Tracy Beaker Returns; The Dumping Ground; Doctors

Kia May Pegg (born 29 June 2000) is an English actress and television presenter. She portrayed Jody Jackson in the British children's drama show Tracy Beaker Returns (2012), as well as the spin-off series The Dumping Ground (2013–2022). Then from 2022 to 2024, Pegg appeared in the BBC soap opera Doctors as receptionist Scarlett Kiernan, for which she received award nominations at the RTS Midlands Awards, the British Soap Awards and the Inside Soap Awards. Pegg also began presenting Saturday Mash-Up! for CBBC in 2022.

== Life and career ==
Pegg was born in Birmingham on 29 June 2000 to boxing trainer and promoter, Jonathan and Rachel Pegg and has two younger brothers. Pegg began training at Birmingham Stage School Showbiz and the Television Workshop. Her first acting appearance was in an advertisement showing how to perform swine flu protocols. In 2008, she made an appearance on The Legend of Dick and Dom, followed by a role in the 2010 film Toast. She then appeared in Horrid Henry: The Movie, in the role of Vicious Vicky. Then in 2012, she portrayed Jody Jackson in the CBBC drama Tracy Beaker Returns, later reprising her role in the follow-up series The Dumping Ground that premiered in 2013. In 2014, Pegg was nominated for a BAFTA for her role as Jody in the second series of The Dumping Ground. After eleven years on The Dumping Ground, Pegg was told that she was set to be written out of the series. She made her final appearance in 2022.

In 2017, Pegg appeared in an episode of the BBC soap opera Doctors as Zoe McCluskey. Later that year, she played Peewee in the film The Quiet One. For her portrayal, she won the award for Best Young Actor at the Birmingham Film Festival. She then made various film appearances; A Bullet Wasted (2019), Leap (2020), SeaView (2021) and Making Friends as the World Ends (2022). In March 2022, it was announced that she had been cast as receptionist Scarlett Kiernan in the BBC soap opera Doctors. She made her first appearance on 7 April 2022. For her role as Scarlett, she received a nomination in the Breakthrough category at the 2022 RTS Midlands Awards. Also in 2022, in-between filming for Doctors, Pegg began making recurring presenting appearances on CBBC's Saturday Mash-Up!. In October 2023, it was announced that BBC had cancelled Doctors. Pegg portrayed Scarlett until its final episode, which aired on 14 November 2024. Following the end of the soap, she was promoted to a regular presenter on Saturday Mash-Up!.

== Filmography ==
Year	Title	Role	Notes	Ref.
2011	Horrid Henry: The Movie	Vicious Vicky		
2011	Internalised	Little Girl	Short film	
2017	The Quiet One	Peewee		
2019	A Bullet Wasted	The Daughter	Short film	
2020	Leap	Jess	Short film	
2021	SeaView	She		
2022	Making Friends as the World Ends	Billie	Also executive producer	
2026	Peaky Blinders: The Immortal Man	BSA Worker #4		

Year	Title	Role	Notes
2010	The Legend of Dick and Dom	Barbara	Episode: "Hag Puss"
2010	Toast	Milk Girl	Television film
2012	Tracy Beaker Returns	Jody Jackson	Recurring role (season 3)
2013–2026	The Dumping Ground	Jody Jackson	Main role (season 1–10)
2014–2020	The Dumping Ground Survival Files	Jody Jackson	Recurring role
2017	Doctors	Zoe McCluskey	
2023–2024	Doctors	Scarlett Kiernan	261 episodes
2016	The Dumping Ground: I'm...	Jody Jackson	Recurring role (season 1)

== Awards and nominations ==
Year	Award	Category	Nominated work	Result	Ref.
2014	BAFTA Children's Awards	Best Performer	Jody Jackson (The Dumping Ground)	Nominated	
2017	Birmingham Film Festival	Best Young Actor	Peewee (The Quiet One)	Won	
2019	RTS North East and Border Awards	Drama Performance	Jody Jackson (The Dumping Ground)	Won	
2022	RTS Midlands Awards	Breakthrough (on screen)	Scarlett Kiernan (Doctors)	Nominated	
2023	British Soap Awards	Best Newcomer	Scarlett Kiernan (Doctors)	Nominated	
2023	Inside Soap Awards	Best Daytime Star	Scarlett Kiernan (Doctors)	Nominated	
2024	Inside Soap Awards	Best Daytime Star	Scarlett Kiernan (Doctors)	Nominated	
