= Connor Byrne =

Irish actor (born 1950)

- Born: 18 March 1964 (age 62); Limerick, Ireland
- Occupations: Actor; former dancer
- Years active: 1991–present
- Television: London's Burning; The Story of Tracy Beaker; Tracy Beaker Returns; The Dumping Ground

Connor Byrne (born 18 March 1964) is an Irish actor and former dancer, known for his role as Mike Milligan in The Story of Tracy Beaker, Tracy Beaker Returns, The Dumping Ground and The Beaker Girls. Having played the role between 2002 and 2023, he is the longest serving cast member in the franchise.

== Career ==
Before Byrne entered into the acting world, he danced with companies around the world. He first performed in the West End Theater. Byrne's first acting role was as Dan in a 1991 television production of Joseph and the Amazing Technicolour Dreamcoat. His first main role was as Rob “Hyper” Sharpe in London's Burning, a role he played for two years. Byrne is known for portraying the role of Mike Milligan in the Tracy Beaker franchise. Having portrayed the role of Mike between 2002 and 2023, he is the longest serving character in the franchise.

== Filmography ==
Television
Year	Title	Role	Notes
1991	Joseph and the Amazing Technicolour Dreamcoat	Dan	Television film
1993	Inspector Morse	Constable Williams	Episode: "Deadly Summer"
1994	The Bill	Connor	Episode: "Unfinished Business"
1996	The Bill	P.C. Menten	2 episodes
1998	Mosley	Liam	Episode: "Young Man in a Hurry"
1998	Dangerfield	Stephen Milne	Episode: "A Place of Safety"
1998	Birds of a Feather	Roddy	Episode: "Holy Ground"
2000–2001	London's Burning	Rob "Hyper" Sharpe	Regular role; 31 episodes
2002, 2005	The Story of Tracy Beaker	Mike Milligan	Regular role; 42 episodes
2002	Holby City	Ray Williams	Episode: "Life Goes On"
2003	Waking the Dead	Geddes	2 episodes
2003–2007	Jakers! The Adventures of Piggley Winks	Various	UK dub
2004	Love is the Drug	Barber	Series 1: Episode 1
2004	Tracy Beaker Parties With Pudsey	Mike Milligan	Children in Need special
2005	William and Mary	Eamon	Recurring role; 5 episodes
2005	The Last Detective	Geoff Fallon	Episode: "Willesden Confidential"
2005	Holby City	Callum Daniels	Episode: "Dignity"
2008	Holby City	Dale Wakefield	Episode: "Stolen"
2010–2012	Tracy Beaker Returns	Mike Milligan	All 39 episodes
2012	Tracy Beaker Survival Files	Mike Milligan	Main role
2013–2019	The Dumping Ground	Mike Milligan	Regular role; 136 episodes
2014	The Dumping Ground Survival Files	Mike Milligan	Main role
2015	Train Station	Man in Brown	Film role
2016–2017	The Dumping Ground: I'm...	Mike Milligan	Main role
2019	Emmerdale	Geoff	Recurring role; 3 episodes
2021	Emmerdale	Doctor	5 episodes
2022	Doctors	Dale Roberts	Episode: "Blocking It"
2023	The Beaker Girls	Mike Milligan	Episode: “The Trial of Tracy Beaker”
2025	The Hardacres	Victor Ward	Season 1; 5 episodes

Film
Year	Title	Role	Notes
1998	Monk Dawson	Fergal Moran	
2002	A Trip To See Santa	Dad	His daughter Mimi also appeared in this film
2009	Hell's Pavement	Peter O'Connor	
2010	Centurion	Unknown voice role	Uncredited
2010	Final Call	Davis	Short film
2010	Fairytale of London Town	Sergeant Richards	Short film
2017	Level Up Norge	Father Gascoigne	Web series; voice role

Video games
Year	Title	Role
2014	Dark Souls II	Laddersmith Gilligan
2014	The Dumping Ground Game	Mike Milligan
2015	The Dumping Ground: You're the Boss	Mike Milligan
2015	Bloodborne	Father Gascoigne
2024	Elden Ring Shadow of the Erdtree	Midra, Lord of Frenzied Flame
